= Bibliotheca Fratrum Polonorum quos Unitarios vocant =

The Bibliotheca Fratrum Polonorum quos Unitarios vocant or Library of the Polish Brethren called Unitarians 1665, 1668, 1692 (not 1656 as incorrectly listed in some catalogs) is a collection of writings of the Polish Brethren published by Frans Kuyper, Daniel Bakkamude, and Benedykt's father Andrzej Wiszowaty Sr. (d.1678) in Amsterdam, with Pieter van der Meersche in Leiden.

Many of these works had earlier been printed by Rodecki and Sternacki at the printery of the Racovian Academy 1602-1638.

== Volumes ==
Volumes 1-8 1665,1668, 1692

- Vols I-II Fausto Sozzini, Fausti Socini opera omnia include Tractatus de justificatione etc. (published 1668, after the 1665 publication of Vols III-VI)
- Vols III-V: Johann Crell, Joannis Crellii opera omnia include some works by Szlichtyng, based on lectures of Crellius. (1665, 4 tomes in 3 vols)
- Vol VI Jonasz Szlichtyng, Jonæ Slichtingii... commentaria posthuma, in plerosque Novi Testamenti libros... hactenus inedita, include de magistratu, bello, et privata defensione, ... didactica, et polemica etc. (1665, 2 tomes in one volume)
- Vols VII-VIII: Johann Ludwig von Wolzogen, Johannis Ludovici Wolzogenii... opera omnia, exegetica, didactica, et polemica, etc. (1668)
- Vol IX. Samuel Przypkowski, Cogitationes sacrae ad initium Evangelii Matthaei et omnes Epistolas apostolicas. 1692 (edited by John Locke's correspondent Philippus van Limborch (1633-1712) the Dutch Remonstrant theologian). This final volume was prepared for publication by Benedykt Wiszowaty (the great-grandson of Faustus Socinius), who added eight brief essays on the history of Polish Socinianism.

=== Circulation ===
The Eton College library had a collection of the original Racovian books printed by Sternacki about 1630, possibly donated by John Hales, but these had disappeared by 1674. John Locke possessed a full set of Vols I-VIII and was personally involved in commissioning Vol IX. Pierre Bayle appears to have had access to a full set.

== Related publications ==
Outside the series of the Bibliotheca fratrum Polonorum, various other Racovian and Socinian texts were printed or reprinted in Amsterdam by the same group of exiles, printers and booksellers. The Racovian Catechism and Racovian New Testament which had been published in the Racovian Academy itself, were also reprinted in Amsterdam.

Following completion of the above series Benedykt Wiszowaty was also involved in the other major, but much shorter, Socinian Bibliotheca: the Bibliotheca antitrinitariorum, or Antitrinitarian Library, first published in 1684. This is a posthumous work of Christopher Sandius an exiled Prussian Arian in Amsterdam, in which he chronologically lists all the Arian and Socinian or Antitrinitarian authors from the Reformation to 1684, with a brief account of their lives, and a catalogue of their works. Rather than being a Library, as was Kuyper's publications, it is more a Bibliography.

The Hungarian Unitarian community also published texts in Latin which circulated at the same period, particularly from 1696 after the establishment of a Unitarian printhing house in "Claudiopolis", namely Kolozsvár. Following the involvement of Andrzej Wiszowaty Sr. and Benedykt Wiszowaty in the Bibliotheca fratrum Polonorum, Benedykt's son Andrzej Wiszowaty Jr., great-great-grandson of Fausto Sozzini, taught in the John Sigismund Unitarian Academy 1726-1740, in the years leading to the drafting of the Summa Universae Theologiae Christianae secundum Unitarios (recognised by Joseph II in 1787).

== Online edition ==
- Bibliotheca Fratrum Polonorum Online
