= György Enyedi (Unitarian) =

György Enyedi, in Latin Georgius Eniedinus (1555 – 28 Nov. 1597) was a Hungarian Unitarian bishop, moderator of the John Sigismund Unitarian Academy in Kolozsvár and writer known as the "Unitarian Plato".

Enyedi's major work was the posthumously-published anti-Trinitarian Explicationes (1598) which circulated widely in Europe. The first Catholic refutation of the Explicationes was Ambrosio Peñalosa's Opus egregium (1635). According to Marshall (1994), Locke started his reading of Unitarian writers with Enyedi in 1679, before more extensive exploration of Socinian works 1685-86.

== Works ==
A short biography and bibliography is included in Christof Sand's Bibliotheca Anti-Trinitariorum (1684).

- Explicationes locorum Veteris & Novi Testamenti, ex quibus trinitatis dogma stabiliri solet., 2nd ed. 1598, 3rd edition probably Groningen, 1670.
- De Divintate Christi
- A collection of his sermons, that remained unprinted until the twenty-first century, though copied in various surviving manuscripts in Transylvania.

=== Unknown or mis-attributed works ===
- Explicatio locorum Catechesis Racoviensis - Commentary on the Racovian Catechism, though Christopher Sand (1684) notes "in truth Enyedi died before the Racovian Catechism ... came to light", and concludes that it is a preface to an earlier catechism of Gregorio Pauli and Fausto Sozzini.
- Preface for the Racovian New Testament - though Sand notes again that the two known Racovian translations, "of Smalcius and Crell (sic) into Polish", and Stegman into German, both appeared after Enyedi's death.
