= Johannes Völkel =

Johannes Völkel (Latin: Volkelius; c. 1565 – 1616) was a German Socinian writer.

== Biography ==
Völkel was probably born around 1565–1570 in Grimma and probably converted during his studies at the University of Wittenberg, just as Valentin Schmalz had been converted while at the University of Strassburg, in any case he had joined the Polish Brethren by 1585.

Völkel taught at the Racovian Academy and is often credited with a hand in the Racovian Catechism of 1605 along with Hieronim Moskorzowski, Piotr Stoiński the younger (Polish-born son of Pierre Statorius Sr.), and Valentin Schmalz. Certainly he had a hand in the German translation of 1608. Völkel was one of several Socinians who corresponded with Grotius. He died in Raków.

== De vera religione ==
Völkel's major work was the legacy of the thought of Fausto Sozzini and the first generation of the Racovian academy in De vera religione, "Of True Religion". This was edited posthumously by Jan Crell:

- Iohannis Volkelii misnici - de vera religione libri quinque quibus praefixus est Iohannis Crellii Franci Liber de Deo et ejus attributis, ita ut unum cum illis opus constituat. Five editions were published between 1630 and 1642, being influential on John Locke and others.

De vera religione was the first major systematic presentation of Socinian teaching published at the Racovian Academy, and widely exported around Europe, and earned many responses; among them the Prodromus of the Calvinist encyclopedist Johann Heinrich Alsted (1641), and Samuel Desmarets's negatively annotated anti-edition "The Socinian Hydra expunged!" (1651):

- Samuel Desmarets - Hydra Socinianismi expugnata: sive, Johannis Volkelii Misnici, De vera religione, (ut falsò inscribuntur) libri quinque : quibus præfixus est Johannis Crellii Franci (ejusdem commatis) liber de Deo & ejus attributis, ita ut unum cum illis opus (integrumque, Socinianæ impietatis systema) constituat: cum eorundem refutatione exacta per additas annotationes & censuras necessarias. 1651

== Other works ==
Völkel died before De vera religione could be published. In his life he published various pamphlets, most notably against the Lithuanian Jesuit Martinus Smiglecius (in Lithuanian: Martynas Smigleckis) who had argued against Calvinists, Lutherans, and Socinians, that the only church could be Rome.

- Nodi Gordii à Martino Smiglecio nexi dissolutio 1613 ("The Gordian Knot of Martynas Smigleckis untied")

Following Smiglecius' reply in 1615, Völkel published a further response:

- Responsio ad vanam refutationem dissolutionis nodi Gordii a Martino Smiglecio nexi dissolutio 1618 ("A reply to the vain refutation to The Gordian Knot untied")
