= Philipp van Limborch =

Dutch Remonstrant theologian

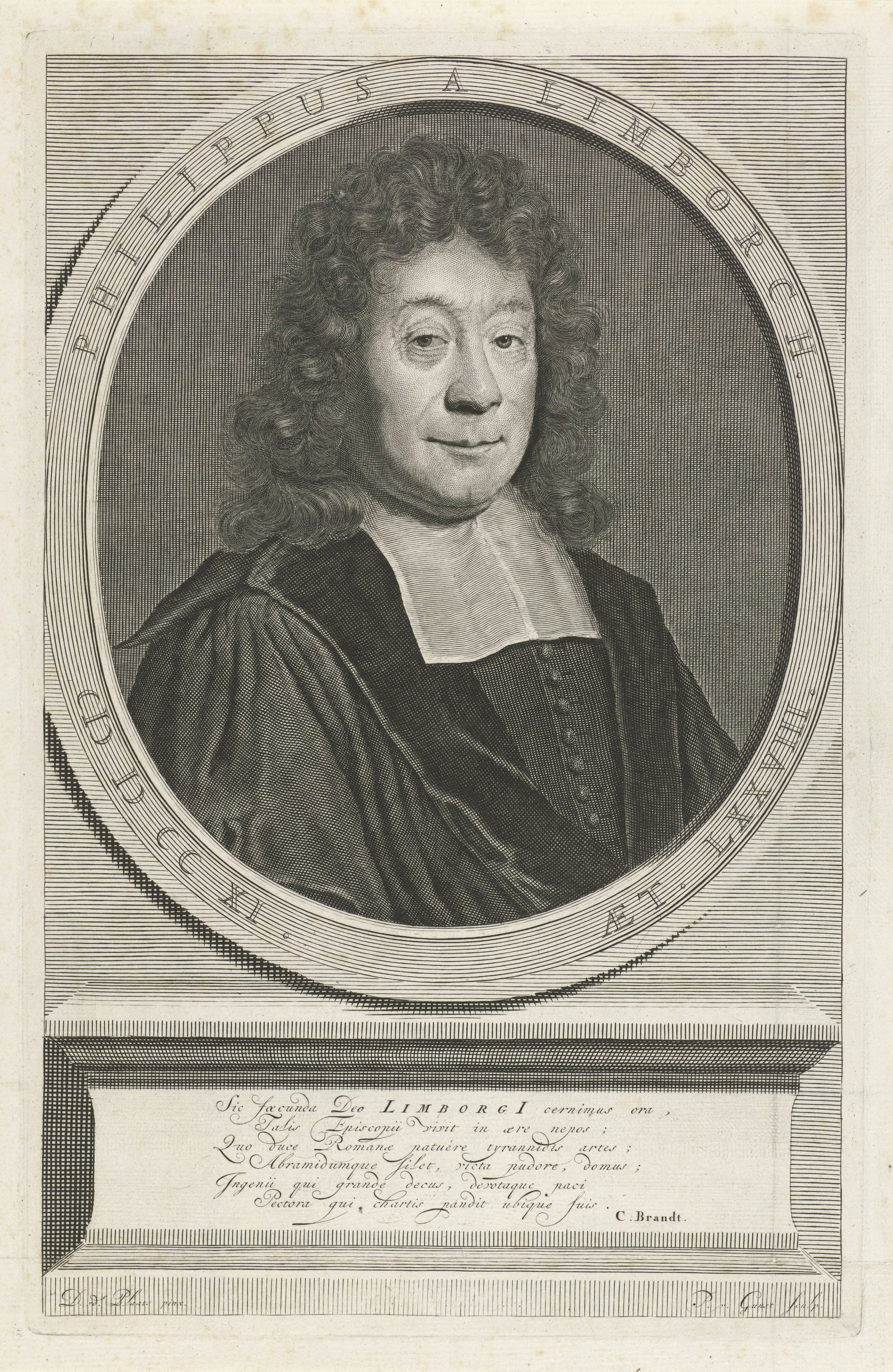
- Born: 19 June 1633; Amsterdam, Netherlands
- Died: 30 April 1712 (aged 78); Amsterdam, Netherlands
- Occupations: professor and pastor

Academic background
- Education: Utrecht University

Academic work
- Discipline: theology
- Institutions: Remonstrants Seminarium
- Notable works: Institutiones theologiae christianae, ad praxin pietatis et promotionem pacis, christianae unice directae

Philipp van Limborch (19 June 1633 – 30 April 1712) was a Dutch Remonstrant theologian and a fierce opponent of the philosophy of Baruch Spinoza's in the Tractatus Theologico-Politicus. He befriended John Locke, who lived in voluntary political exile in the Netherlands (1683–88).

== Biography ==
Limborch was born on 19 June 1633 in Amsterdam, where his father was a lawyer. He received his education at Utrecht, at Leiden, in his native city, and finally at Utrecht University, which he entered in 1652. In 1657 he became a Remonstrant pastor at Gouda, and in 1667 he was transferred to Amsterdam, where, in the following year, the office of professor of theology in the Remonstrant seminary was added to his pastoral charge. He was a friend of John Locke, living in exile in the Dutch Republic, whose A Letter Concerning Toleration was likely addressed to, and first published by, Philipp van Limborch. Limborch died in Amsterdam on 30 April 1712.

== Theology ==
Many scholars argue that Limborch diverged substantially from Jacobus Arminius and Arminianism as it was originally taught. Others place him far closer to the broader orthodox Remonstrant tradition. He embraced Rationalism and a more optimistic view of anthropology. Some say that he practically denied total depravity and assimilated prevenient grace to common grace. For Limborch, man is deprived of the knowledge which informs the intellect, but the will is fully capable within itself, if it is informed by the intellect, to will and perform the good in general. However, he still denied that man can attain the full good (that is, ultimate salvation) without an internal movement of grace which grants to man things otherwise impossible for him.

== Works ==
His most important work, Institutiones theologiae christianae, ad praxin pietatis et promotionem pacis, christianae unice directae (Amsterdam, 1686, 5th ed., 1735), is a full and clear exposition of the system of Simon Episcopius and Stephan Curcellaeus. The fourth edition (1715) included a posthumous Relatio historica de origine et progressu controversiarum in foederato Belgio de praedestinatione.

Limborch also wrote:

- De veritate religionis Christianae amica collatio cum erudito Judaeo (Gouda, 1687) (the "erudite Jew" in question was Isaac Orobio de Castro)
- Historia Inquisitionis (1692), in four books prefixed to the Liber Sententiarum Inquisitionis Tolosanae (1308–1323)
- Commentarius in Acta Apostolorum et in Epistolas ad Romanos et ad Hebraeos (Rotterdam, 1711)

An English translation of the Theologia was published in 1702 by William Jones (A Complete System or Body of Divinity, both Speculative and Practical, founded on Scripture and Reason, London, 1702); and a translation of the Historia Inquisitionis, by Samuel Chandler, with a large introduction concerning the rise and progress of persecution and the real and pretended causes of it prefixed, appeared in 1731. See Herzog-Hauck, Realencyklopädie.

== Editorial work ==
He brought to publication Jacobus Batelier's refutation of Baruch Spinoza's Tractatus Theologico-Politici in 1673, under the title Vindiciae miraculorum per quae divine religionis et fidei Christianae veritas olint confirmata fuit, Adversis profanum auctorem Tractatus Theologico-Politici, "one of the earliest refutations" of Spinoza.

In 1689 Limborch edited the compilation of Socinian Samuel Przypkowski's works in the last volume of the Bibliotheca antitrinitariorum or Bibliotheca Fratrum Polonorum of the Polish Brethren. Previous volumes had been edited after the death of Christopher Sandius by Benedykt Wiszowaty in 1684.

His editorial labors included the publication of various works of his predecessors, and of Epistolae ecclesiasticae praestantum ad eruditorum virorum (Amsterdam, 1684), chiefly, by Jacobus Arminius, Joannes Uytenbogardus, Konrad Vorstius, Gerhard Vossius, Hugo Grotius, Simon Episcopius (his grand-uncle) and Caspar Barlaeus; they are of great value for the history of Arminianism.

His edition of the Liber Sententiarum Inquisitionis Tolosanae is still considered important nowadays for its meticulous transcription of a manuscript by the Dominican inquisitor Bernard Gui long regarded as lost forever, but rediscovered in London (British Library, ms. Add. 4697). Recently a new edition has appeared (Le Livre des sentences de l'inquisiteur Bernard Gui (1308-1323) edited by Annette Palès-Gobillard (2 volumes, Paris 2003).

== Notes and references ==
=== Sources ===
- Chisholm, Hugh, ed. (1911). "Limborch, Philipp van" . Encyclopædia Britannica. Vol. 16 (11th ed.). Cambridge University Press. p. 691.
- Hicks, John Mark (1985). The Theology of Grace in the Thought of Jacobus Arminius and Philip van Limborch: A Study in the Development of Seventeenth-Century Dutch Arminianism (Ph.D thesis). Westminster Theological Seminary.
- Olson, Roger E. (2009). Arminian Theology: Myths and Realities. Downers Grove: InterVarsity Press.
