= Benedykt Wiszowaty =

Polish Socinian and nobleman (c.1650 – after 1704)

Benedykt Wiszowaty (c. 1650 – after 1704 Kosinowo) was a Polish Socinian, nobleman, author and publisher.

After the Sejm expelled the Socinians from Poland, he left the country with his father. From 1666, they lived in Amsterdam, where he conducted publishing activities. Around 1680 he moved to the Duchy of Prussia. At the synod of Polish brothers in Rudówka on October 14, 1684, he was elected minister of the protestant church in Kosinowo.

== Family ==
Coat of Arms: Pierzchała/Roch

Polish nobleman. Coat-of-arms: Pierzchała/Roch

great-great-grandfather Krzysztof Morsztyn Sr. (1522–1600) founder of Filipów.
great-grandparents Fausto Sozzini and Elżbieta Morsztyn (sister of Krzysztof Morsztyn Jr. c. 1580 – 1642)
grandparents Stanisław Wiszowaty and Agnieszka Sozzini
parents Andrzej Wiszowaty Sr. and Agnieszka Rupniowska de Rupniów (coat-of-arms: Drużyna)
wife: Eufronzyna Sierakowska widowed of John Lubiniecki (1653–1683)
son Andrzej Wiszowaty Jr. (1685–1735)

== Selected works ==
- Catechesis ecclesiarum Polonicarum : unum Deum Patrem, illiusque filium unigenitum Jesum Christum una cum Spiritu Sancto ex Sacra Scriptura confitentium; primum anno 1609 in lucem emissa & post earundem ecclesiarum iusso correcta ac dimidia amplius parte aucta, Amsterdam 1684 (together with Andrzej Wiszowaty Sr., Johannes Crellius, Jonasz Szlichtyng and Marcin Ruar
- Confessio fidei Christianae secundum Unitarios, 1782
- Medulla historiae ecclesiasticae (manuscript)

He edited and published The Bibliotheca antitrinitariorum, or Antitrinitarian Library, in Freistadt, Austria, in 1684, from the work of Christopher Sandius, Amsterdam, who had died four years earlier. Some of the material had already appeared in the Bibliotheca Fratrum Polonorum of 1668 (not 1656). He corresponded with the then Protestant theologians, incl. Philipp van Limborch, Jean Le Clerc and Anton van Dale.
