= Georg Schomann =

Georg Schomann (Polish Jerzy Szoman) (Racibórz 1530 - Chmielnik 1591) was a Socinian (Unitarian) theologian.

In his youth, was distinguished by a deep Catholic religiosity. In the years 1552-1554 he studied at the Kraków Academy and then at Wittenberg, where he was Lutheran. He soon converted to Calvinism, and moved to Pińczów, where from 1558 to 1561 he taught at the local school and was a Protestant minister in churches in Pińczów and Książ. He was one of the authors of the Polish Brest Bible (1563). In Pińczów he funded and founded a library, mainly the work of the Swiss reformers, for the sum of 40 ducats. Here, too, he married.

His interest in anabaptist doctrine, led him in 1569 to travel to Hutterite communities, and he was baptized in 1572 among the Polish Brethren and in 1573 started to operate as an Arian preacher in Kraków, then Lutosławice 1586–1588, and finally Chmielnik 1589–1591.

Schomann presented radical religious and social views in polemical writings, and in many disputes, diets and synods, including a famous debate with the Jesuit Piotr Skarga by invitation at the house of salt mine owner Prospero Provana in Kraków. The debate played host to the leading Italian Antitrinitarian exiles, including Giorgio Biandrata, Bernardino Ochino, Giovanni Alciato and Giovanni Gentile. Schomann debated also with Faustus Socinus.

== Works ==
- Autobiographical Testamentum ultimae voluntatis (1684 in Amsterdam in "Bibliotheca antitrinitariorum" of Christopher Sandius

Schomann drew up the first Socinian catechism (1574) of the Polish Brethren. It was followed by that of Faustus Socinus himself.

Like another Polish Brethren writer Andrzej Wiszowaty he was cited by Voltaire
