= Racovian New Testament =

Polish Unitarian Bible translations

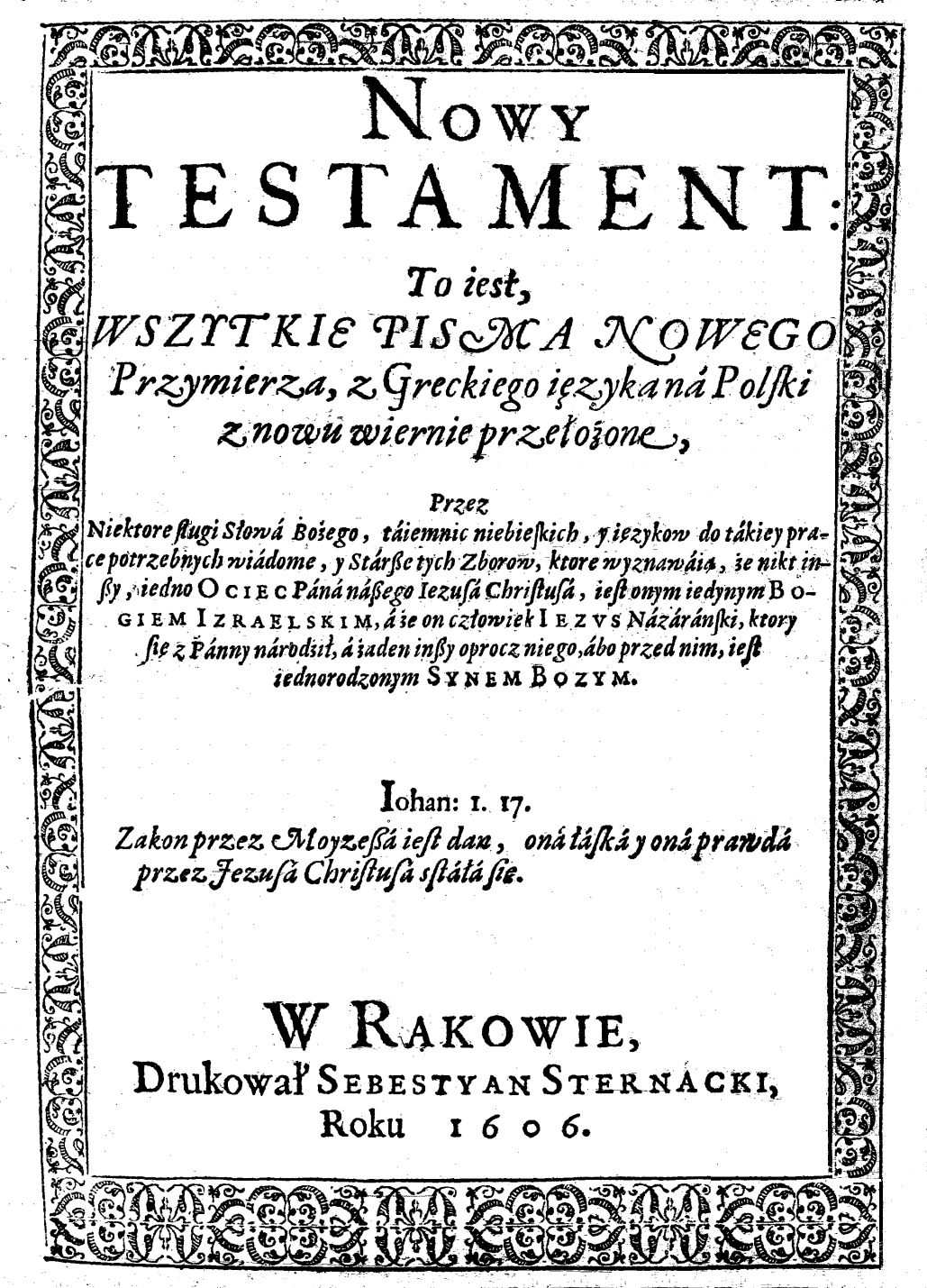
Racovian New Testament (1606)

The Racovian New Testament refers to two separate translations produced by the Unitarian Polish Brethren at the printing presses of the Racovian Academy, Raków, Poland.

== Enyedi's "Preface to the Racovian New Testament" ==
Christopher Sandius in his Anti-Trinitarian Library lists the preface in Latin to a "Racovian New Testament", by the Transylvanian Unitarian bishop George Enyedinus, which Sand notes is impossible since Enyedi died before either of the known Racovian versions were published. It may be that Enyedi's preface attached to some other translation produced by the Polish Brethren, for example, as the suggestion by Wallace that this may refer to the translation into Polish of the New Testament of Marcin Czechowic published at Raków before the existence of the academy in 1577 by Alexius Rodecki, and without the place of printing being indicated. Or alternatively since the preface attributed to Enyedi is in Latin, there may have conceivably have been a Latin New Testament originating from Rodecki's press which is now unknown.

== Polish New Testament ==
Aside from Rodecki's printing of Czechowicz' version in 1577 the first official translation was that translation by Walenty Smalc from Greek to Polish in 1606, reprinted 1620. The existence of a preface from 1605 suggests that the 1606 edition may have been a second printing. An extensive subtitle argues for sola scriptura view of scriptures and the typical Socinian belief in Jesus as "Son of God,... not God, ...born of the virgin birth".

== German New Testament ==
1630 saw the appearance of a German translation by Johannes Crell and Joachim Stegmann.

== Other Unitarian New Testaments ==
The version of Stegmann and Crell is not to be confused with the German New Testament based on Courcelles' Greek text by Jeremias Felbinger, Amsterdam 1660.
