= Jonasz Szlichtyng =

Polish nobleman and theologian

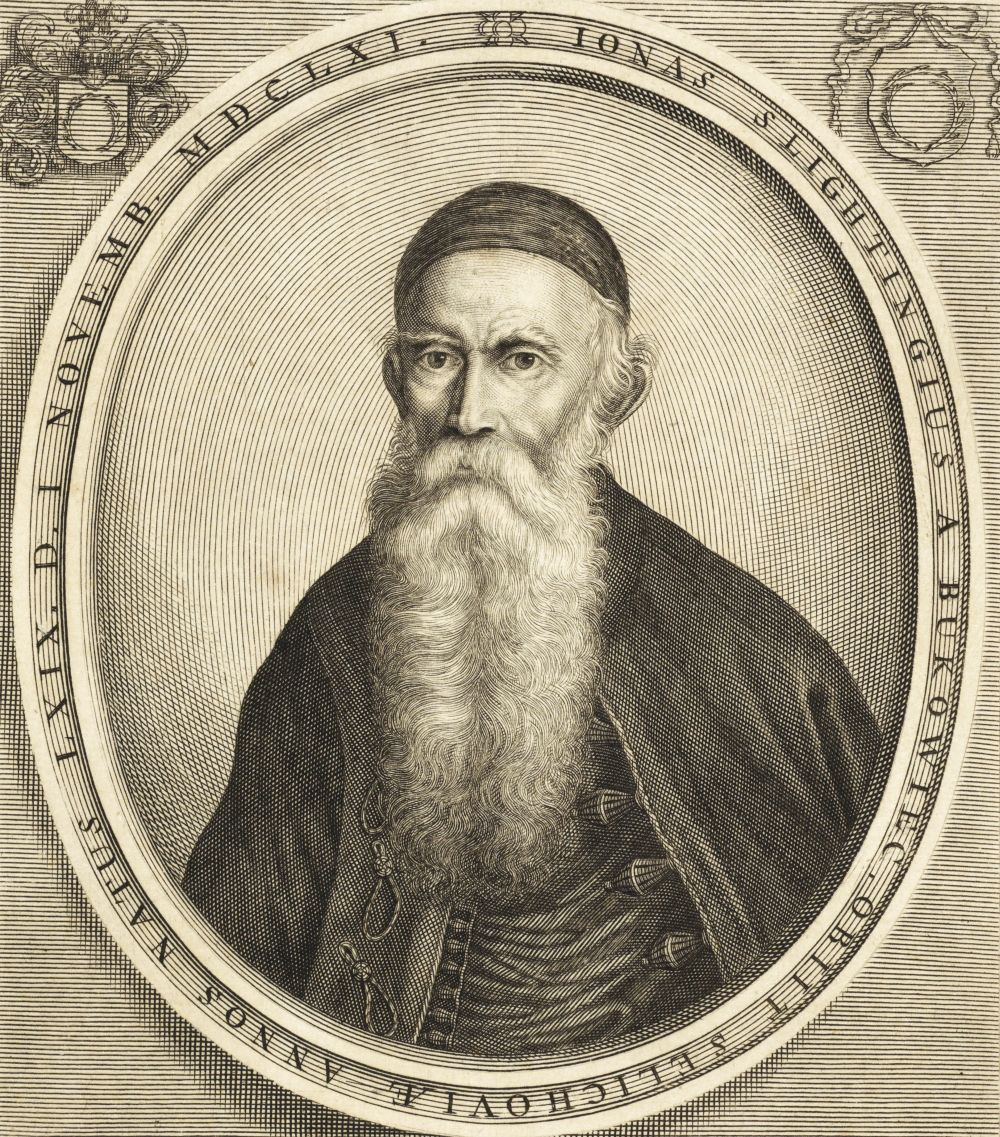
Jonasz Szlichtyng engraved by Lambert Visscher

Jonasz Szlichtyng (German: Jonas Schlichting) (1592 in Bukowiec, Lubusz Voivodeship – 1661 in Sulechów) was a Polish nobleman, theologian of the Socinian Polish Brethren and father of Krzysztof Szlichtyng.

He studied in Germany, from where he returned to teach in Raków, Kielce County at the Racovian Academy, and then in Lusławice, Lesser Poland Voivodeship. Following the 1639 ban on Socinianism he was convicted by the Warsaw parliament in 1647 for spreading "godless" dogma and exiled. He hid for several months in the homes of sympathetic nobles but finally departed for the safety and freedom of the Netherlands, where he was science tutor to Zbigniew Sieniński. During the Swedish invasion 1655 he returned temporarily to Kraków, but after their withdrawal he was forced to leave the country again but never made it back to Amsterdam. He died in Sulechów on the border of Silesia.

His writings, like those of Samuel Crell (nephew of Johann Crell) and Marcin Ruar, had influence on English Unitarians.

== Major works ==
Bible commentaries

- 1634 Hebrews Commentarius in Epistolam ad Hebræos 1634

Galatians Romans etc. republished posthumously.

- 1625 "Odpowiedź na script X. D. Clementinusa" (Raków 1625) "An answer to the tract of X.D. Clementinus"
- 1637 Ionæ Schlichtingii de ss. Trinitate, de moralibus N.&V. Testamenti
- 1636 Quæstiones duæ: vna Num in evangelicorum religione dogmata habeantur, quæ ...
- 1635 Quæstio Num ad regnum Dei possidendum necesse sit in nullo peccato
- 1642, 1651 Confessio fidei Christiane etc.." (1642) the work which caused his exile, and was then translated into German, French and Dutch.
- 1652 Confessionis Christianae ad rogum damnatae & combustae manium a Rev. D ...
- 1652 Reverendi viri Nicolai Cichovii, societatis quae Jesu praefert, Centuria

Posthumus:

- 1665 Biblioteca Fratrum Polonorum Vol.VI Commentaria posthuma, in plerosque Novi Testamenti libros including Hebrews Commentarius in Epistolam ad Hebræos 1634 Galatians Romans etc.
- 1685 ed. Grotius: Jonae Slichtingii notae in Hugonis Grotii votum pro pace
- 1680 Ethica Aristotelica, ad Sacrarum Literarum normam emendata Joachimus Pastorius, Jonasz Szlichting, Martinus Ruarus, Andreas Wissowatius.

== Online edition ==
- Bibliotheca Fratrum Polonorum Online
