= Wiszowaty =

Wiszowaty (feminine: Wiszowata) is a Polish surname. Notable people with this surname include:

- Andrzej Wiszowaty (1608–1678), Polish Unitarian
- Andrzej Wiszowaty Jr. (c.1690 – 1735), Polish Unitarian
- Benedykt Wiszowaty (c. 1655 – c. 1704), Polish Unitarian
