= Crellius =

The Latinate surname Crellius is a surname. Notable people with the surname include three generations of Socinian theologians:

- Johannes Crellius, Jan Crell 1590–1633, father
- Christopher Crellius, Krzysztof Crell-Spinowski (Latin: Spinovius) 1622–1680, son
- Samuel Crellius, Samuel Crell-Spinowski 1660–1747, grandson
