= Daniel Zwicker =

German physician (1612–1678)

Daniel Zwicker (22 January 1612 – 10 November 1678) was a German physician from Danzig, and a Socinian theologian and controversialist of the Polish Brethren.

== Life ==
He was the son of Friedrich Zwicker, Lutheran minister of the Church of St. Bartholomew at Danzig. He was educated for the medical profession at the University of Königsberg which he entered in 1629, and where he graduated with a Doctor's degree. Florian Crusius first influenced him in the direction of Unitarian theology.

He met with considerable opposition, beginning with his brother Friedrich who had succeeded his father as minister. He left Danzig for Poland. Meeting some Hutterite missionaries from Slovakia, around 1650, he spent time at Bruderhofs in the community of Andreas Ehrenpreis; but returned to Danzig. He returned to Strassin, where he lived for a while.

From 1657 he moved to the Netherlands, and died in Amsterdam.

== Works ==
His main theological interest lay in patristics. His Irenicum Irenicorum (1658) attempted to reconstruct Christian theology before the Nicene Creed. Zwicker proposed that Christ's divinity, the pre-existence of Christ, and the incarnation were inventions of early heretics. It was attacked in detail by George Bull. Bull's biographer Robert Nelson considered him an influential Unitarian, writing:

He was the first and most considerable of those Unitarian writers, which have fallen under the animadversion of Dr. Bull; for he was before Sandius, and both Sandius and Mr. Gilbert Clerke have but copied in a manner after this learned Dantzicker, as also the rest have done, that have engaged on that side of the controversy.

He was criticized by Samuel Przypkowski, and fell into controversy with Jan Amos Komenský (Comenius). Following David Blondel's Joanna Papissa (1657) which disproved the historical reality of Pope Joan Zwicker criticized the Joanna Papissa restituta of Samuel Desmarets (Maresius) anonymously, in a work published with those of Étienne de Courcelles.
