= Valentinus Smalcius =

German Socinian theologian (1572–1622)

Valentinus Smalcius (German: Valentin Schmalz or Schmaltz; Polish: Walenty Smalc) (Gotha, 1572 – Raków, Kielce county 1622) was a German Socinian theologian. He is known for his German translation of the Racovian Catechism, and Racovian New Testament (1606) translated from Greek into Polish. A migrant to Poland, he became largely Polonised towards the end of his life.

Schmalz was converted by Andrzej Wojdowski while at Strassburg University around 1592, and emigrated to Poland on graduation, after which he taught at Smigiel, Lublin, and t. Stanislaw Kot records that Schmalz became "a noteworthy example of the assimilative power of Raków". Like many of the emigrant Germans, French and Italians who came to Poland he married a Pole and brought up his children as Poles. Schmalz became so thorough Polonised that in addition to the Polish New Testament he composed Polish hymns, and kept his personal diary in Polish.

He was a preacher of the Polish Brethren at Raków, Kielce County. The origins of the Racovian Catechism are not quite clear. A traditional view is that Smalcius put it together, perhaps with collaborators, from literary remains of Faustus Socinus. Another is that it was developed by Smalcius and Hieronim Moskorzowski (Moscorovius) in 1605; others say Moskorzowski wrote it with Piotr Stoiński Jr. (son of Pierre Statorius) and Johannes Völkel, and Smalcius was the translator into German for publication in 1608. In any case the Catechism was constructed by disciples of Socinus, and Smalcius probably had a leading role.

Moskorzowski exchanged pamphlets with the Jesuit Piotr Skarga, and Smalcius supported him. He later supported Völkel in a long controversy with the Jesuit Martinus Smiglecius. He also attacked the views of the Lutheran Frantzius (Wolfgang Franz).
