= Krzysztof Arciszewski =

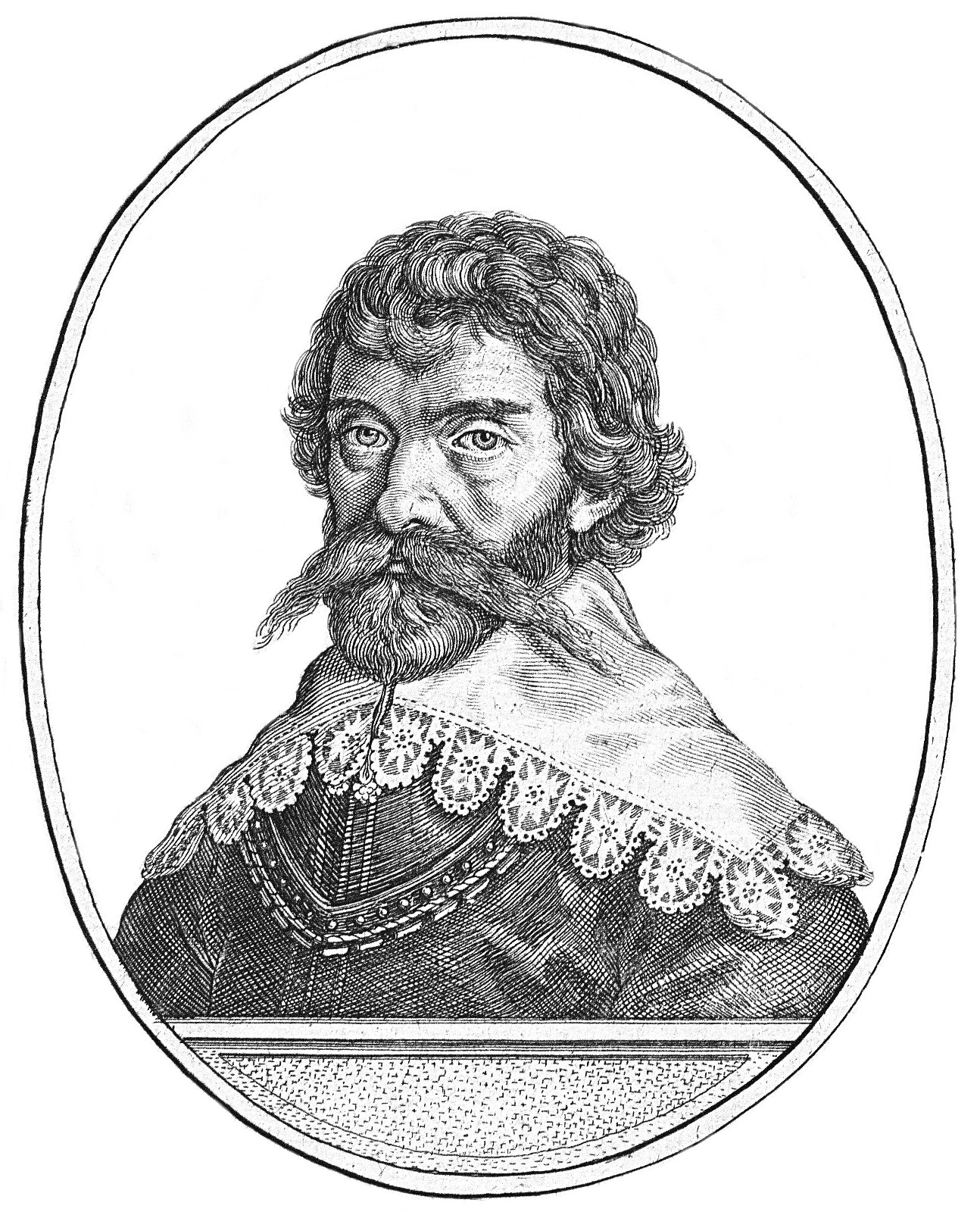
- Born: 9 December 1592; Rogalin, Poland–Lithuania
- Died: 7 April 1656 (aged 63); Near Gdańsk, Poland–Lithuania
- Relatives: Jonasz Szlichtyng (cousin)
- Military career
- Allegiance: Polish–Lithuanian Commonwealth; Dutch Republic
- Rank: General
- Conflicts: Dutch invasions of Brazil

Krzysztof Arciszewski (9 December 1592 – 7 April 1656) was a Polish nobleman, military officer, engineer, and ethnographer. Arciszewski also served as a general of artillery for the Netherlands and Poland.

He was brought up in a family of devout members of the Polish Brethren Church - his father was a pastor, and his cousin was the celebrated theologian Jonasz Szlichtyng. As a young man he served under Krzysztof Radziwiłł. After murdering Kacper Jaruzel Brzeźnicki, he was condemned to infamy and exile, and left Poland in 1623. He went to the Netherlands where he settled in the Hague. There he converted to Calvinism. Thanks to support of Krzysztof Radziwiłł he was able to study artillery, military engineering and navigation at Leiden University. In 1637 he became a vice-governor of Dutch Brazil and head chief of Dutch military forces in that country.

In 1646 he returned to Poland, where he became General of the Artillery.

== See also ==
- Kazimierz Siemienowicz

== Sources ==
- (in Polish) Krzysztof Arciszewski in pl:Tygodnik Ilustrowany 1859-10-03, pp. 17–18 p. 17 & p. 18
- (in Polish) Arciszewski, Krzysztof in pl:S. Orgelbranda Encyklopedia Powszechna (1898) v. 1, pp. 415-416
