= Karol Grycz-Śmiłowski =

Polish Lutheran priest (1885–1959)

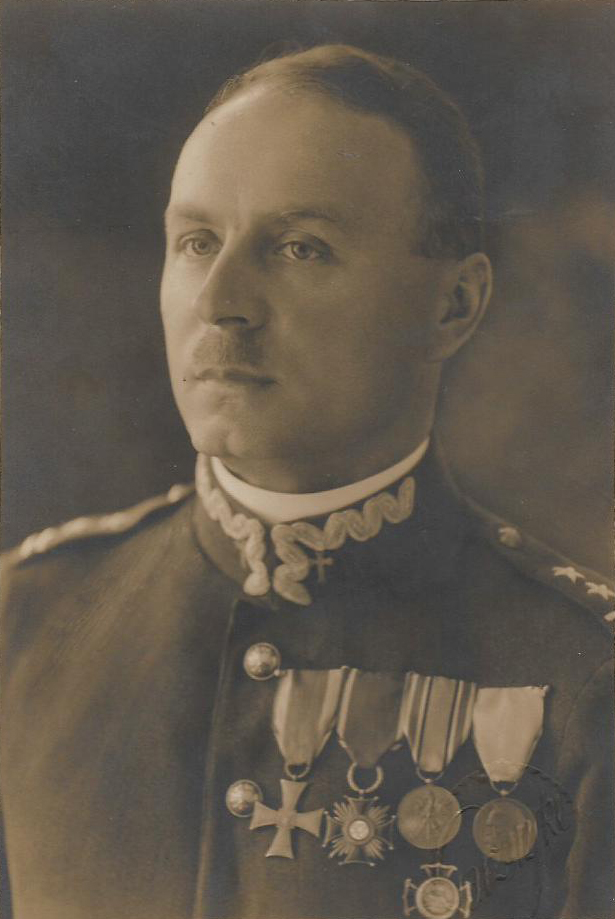
Karol Grycz-Śmiłowski

Karol Grycz-Śmiłowski (17 September 1885 in Śmiłowice – 16 February 1959 in Kraków) was a Polish Lutheran priest who sought to reestablish the Polish Brethren of the period 1565–1658.

Grycz-Śmiłowski was head of the Lutheran pastoral care service in Kraków. In 1934 he published A contemporary faith from the Holy Land ("Z ziemi świętej nowoczesne Wierzę") in which he presented himself as a free thinker, heir to the Polish Brethren. In 1936 he founded a small group started to publish the quarterly magazine Free Religious Thought ("Wolna Myśl Religijna"). In 1937 at a meeting in Łódź he founded the free religious association "Bracia Polscy", which in 1945 changed its name to "Jednota Braci Polskich".

In 1937 Grycz-Śmiłowski took part in a Unitarian conference.

Grycz-Śmiłowski aimed to follow the general outlines of the original Socinians, to proclaim the compatibility of faith with reason, and oppose the Trinity. They also practised baptism by immersion. Though how much detailed adherence there was to the original 1604 Racovian Catechism is open to question.

The Jednota continued in an uneasy stand-off with both the mainstream Protestant churches and the Communist Government after 1945. Shortly before Grycz-Śmiłowski's death in 1959 he was permitted to attend the 16th International Association for Liberal Christianity and Religious Freedom Congress in Chicago.

== Works ==
- Karol Grycz-Śmiłowski Bracia Polscy, Arianie - Unitarianie: zarys dziejów undated 16
- Karol Grycz-Śmiłowski Z ziemi świe̜tej nowoczesne "Wierze̜." 1937 - 51 pages
- Karol Grycz-Śmiłowski Wyganie i powrot Arian do Polski w 300-lecie ich męczeństwa 1934 262 pages

== After Grycz-Śmiłowski's death in 1959 ==
The Jednota was registered with the Communist Government in 1967. It had then an assembly in Kraków, a lightstand in Bielsko and a missionary outpost in Warsaw.

After the death of Grycz-Śmiłowskiego the Jednota evolved ideologically. It separated into two distinct groups: the Polish Brethren Unity Church of Unitarians in Krakow and Wroclaw, and the Panmonist group in Warsaw.

Jednota of Polish Brethren, Wrocław

In 1984 the main group joined the Pentecostals, while retaining certain elements of Arian belief. A feature of the Jednota is the attachment to the Law of Moses. They kept seventh-day Sabbath and celebrated the Lord's Supper on 14 Nissan, as well as keeping other Jewish holidays, such as the Feast of Tabernacles, and the Ten Commandments as recorded in the Pentateuch.

Panmonist Church, Warsaw

The smaller group is the Zbór Panmonistyczny or Panmonist Church in Warsaw. Poland. Since 1997 this has joined the Polish Unitarian Church.

It is estimated that there are about 250 adherents in both groups.
