= Brest Bible =

First Bible translation into Polish

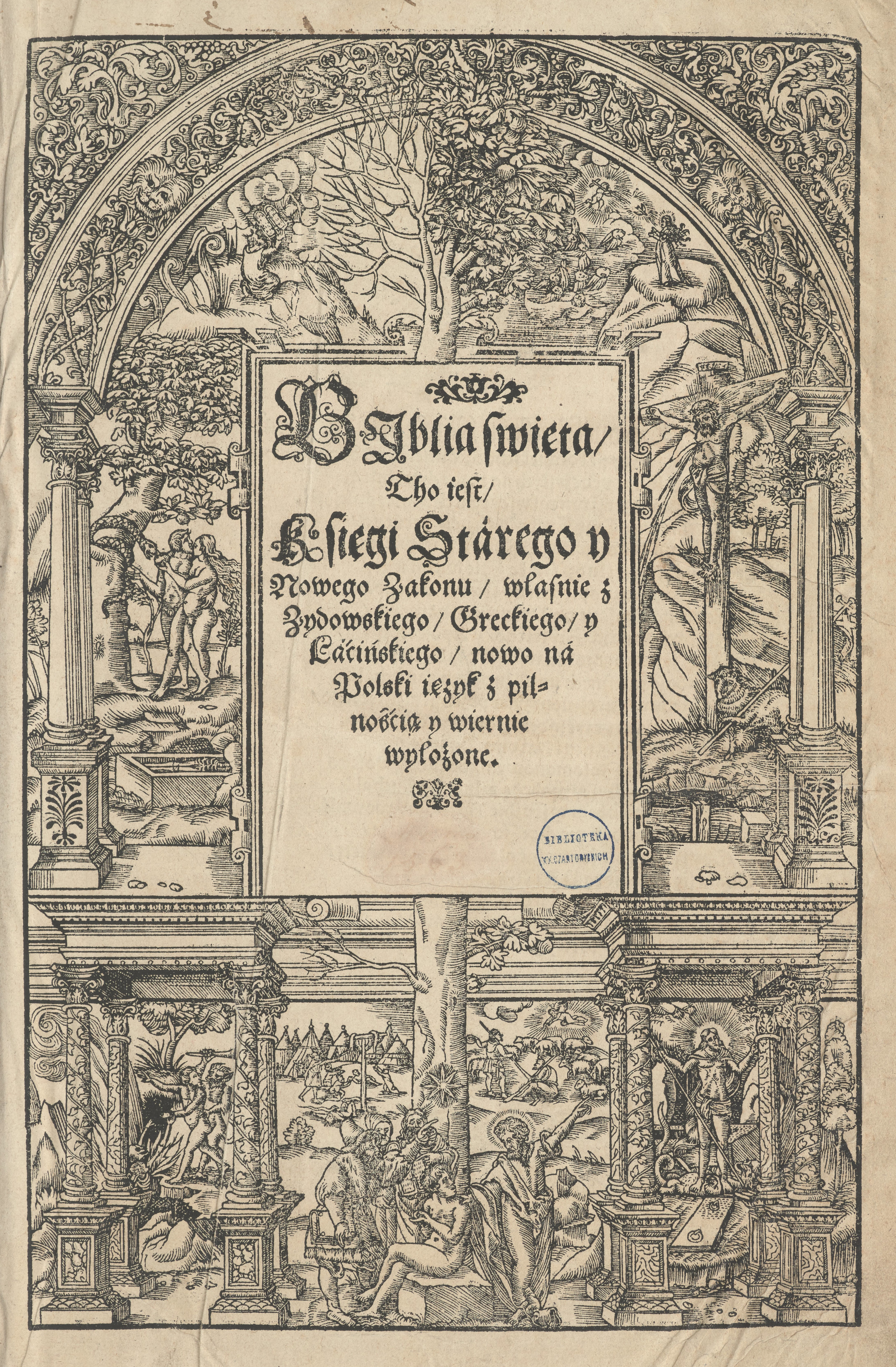
Title page

The Brest Bible (Polish: Biblia Brzeska) was the first complete Protestant Bible translation into Polish, published by Bernard Wojewodka in 1563 in Brest and dedicated to King Sigismund II Augustus.

Polish full original title: Biblia święta, Tho iest, Księgi Starego y Nowego Zakonu, właśnie z Żydowskiego, Greckiego, y Łacińskiego, nowo na Polski ięzyk, z pilnością y wiernie wyłożone.

== Overview ==
It is sometimes also named after the Radziwiłł family surname of Mikołaj Radziwiłł the Black, the benefactor of the undertaking, or after Pińczów, where the translating was commissioned and translators chosen and authorized at the Calvinist synods of 1559 and 1560, and where the work was accomplished.

The Brest Bible is one of the earliest modern era translations of all of the Bible, from, for the most part, the original Hebrew and Koine Greek languages. Latin Vulgate was also utilized to a lesser degree and so was a French translation. The Brest Bible, produced by a group of Calvinist scholars, was preceded by the Luther Bible of 1534 and the Geneva Bible of 1560.

The text of the translation, which stresses contextual and phraseological, rather than word-for-word translating, is highly reliable in respect to the originals and represents some of the finest Polish usage of the period. Among the leading theologians involved with the team translation project were Grzegorz Orszak, Pierre Statorius, Jean Thénaud of Bourges, Jan Łaski, Georg Schomann, Andrzej Trzecieski, Jakub Lubelczyk, Szymon Zacjusz, Marcin Krowicki, Francesco Stancaro of Mantua, and Grzegorz Paweł of Brzeziny. The translation work took six years to complete.

Mikołaj Radziwiłł's son, Mikołaj Krzysztof Radziwiłł the Orphan, converted to Catholicism and as a Counter-Reformation zealot arranged for a public burning of all the specimens of the Bible of Brest that he could locate and buy (some have survived) at Vilnius' central market.
