= Gregory Paul of Brzeziny =

Polish theologian and translator

Grzegorz Paweł z Brzezin (English: Gregory Paul of Brzeziny, Latin: Gregorius Paulus Brzezinensis) (1525–1591), was a Socinian (Unitarian) writer and theologian, one of the principal creators and propagators of radical wing of the Polish Brethren, and author of several of the first theological works in Polish, which helped to the development of literary Polish.

== Biography ==
Paweł was educated at the University of Königsberg, where he encountered the ideas of Lutheranism and Calvinism. Upon his return he became rector of the school at the Catholic Collegiate Church of St. Mary Magdalene in Poznań. But he later had to abandon the position due to profession of Calvinism. From about 1550 he began to openly promote the Reformation, and from 1552, celebrated Protestant worship for the inhabitants of Kraków. He was named pastor in Pełsznicy church, and in 1557 was elected pastor of the church in Kraków. From this time his beliefs became more radical, and in 1562 he broke with Calvinism and became openly nontrinitarian. In 1569 Paweł moved to Raków, in the year the settlement was founded by castellan Jan Sienieński, and Paweł became a leader of the radical wing. He died before the founding of the Racovian Academy (Polish: Akademia Rakowska) in 1602 by Jakub Sienieński.

== Views ==
He preached an early form of socialist utopianism, including community assets and common work. He claimed that the true Christians, that is the Polish Brethren, did not need a State, which was created only for evil people to control and punish them. Although he stressed the need to comply with the secular authorities, he believed that Arians should not participate in the government of the State nor resolve disputes before the courts. He was an unconditional pacifist (like Martin Czechowic).

In the religious sphere he denied the immortality of the soul, claiming that the soul cannot exist outside the body. He also denied the Trinity, Jesus was only a perfect human being, miraculously born for the salvation of humanity, and after the resurrection exalted by God because of the sanctity of his life. He saw the Holy Spirit as allegorical, a personification of all that is "under God".

In 1567 a split occurred among the Brethren. The majority followed the views of Fausto Sozzini, advocated by Grzegorz Paweł z Brzezin and the Silesian Georg Schomann who denied the pre-existence of Christ, though they still accepted the virgin birth of Jesus, unlike later Unitarianism. The minority seceded, holding to the divinity of Christ and pre-existence of Christ (deism). In 1568 Grzegorz Paweł z Brzezin translated into Polish the commentary on the first chapter of the Gospel of John, by Fausto Sozzini.

== Major works ==
- Rozdział Starego Testamentu od Nowego (division of the Old Testament from the New) (c. 1568)
- O prawdziwej śmierci (on the mortality of the soul) (c. 1568)
- O różnicach teraźniejszych (of the distinctions in the present-day) (1564)
