= Hieronim Moskorzowski =

Polish noble

- Pilawa coat of arms
- Full name: Hieronim Gratus z Moskorzewa, Czarnkowy i Prawkowic Moskorzewski
- Born: 1560; Moskorzew
- Died: 19 July 1625 (aged 64–65); Raków, Kielce County
- Noble family: Moskorzewscy
- Spouse: Regina Dudycz
- Issue: Andrzej, Krystian, Stanisław Kazimierz

Hieronim Moskorzowski or Moskorzewski, also known as Moscorovius, Jarosz Moskorzowski, pseudonymy: Eusebius, Medicus, Nobilis, Subditus Fidelis (c. 1560 in Moskorzew – 1625 in Raków, Kielce County) was an administrator of the Racovian Academy, writer, polemicist, and member of the Polish Brethren.

== Biography ==
Moskorzowski was born in 1560 in Moskorzew, near Szczekocin. He came from a noble family, received a comprehensive education, and became involved with the movement of the Polish Brethren.

Unlike the older generation of the Ecclesia Minor he was involved in politics and as a member of the Sejm repeatedly defended the rights of minority believers and dissenters there. At the zjazd meeting of the nobility in Lublin (4 June 1606) he objected to the revolt of the nobility against the king and senators, and was elected to the committee that put together the articles of a request for nobles to the king. He spent time in Gdańsk in 1610, and in 1611 was delegated to the Lithuanian provincial synod. He participated in the Zebrzydowski Rebellion.

He married Regina Dudycz, daughter of Andreas Dudith.

== Works ==
He prepared the Polish and Latin text of the 1605 Racovian Catechism, which Fausto Sozzini, who died in 1604, did not manage to complete. He worked together with Piotr Stoiński Jr. and Jan Völkel. In 1605, Moskorzowski translated the Cathecism into Latin.

=== As author ===
- Oratio qua continetur brevis calumniarum depulsio, quibus premuntur illi qui in doctrina Christi et Apostolorum studium suum posuerunt... Ad regem et senatores fidelis subditi. Kraków: drukarnia A. Rodeckiego, 1595.
- Odpowiedź na script Przestrogą nazwany, który X. Jan Petrycy, minister zboru na Jodłowie, wydał w roku 1600. Raków, 1606.
- Zniesienie zawstydzenia, które X. Piotr Skarga, jezuita, wnieść niesłusznie na zbór Pana Jezusa Nazareńskiego usiłował. Raków, 1607.
- Zniesienie Wtorego zawstydzenia, które X. Piotr Skarga, jezuita, na zbór Pana Jezusa Nazareńskiego wnieść usiłował. Raków, 1610.
- Refutatio Appendicis, quam Martinus Smiglecius jesuita... Hieronimo Moscorovio opposuit, Raków: drukarnia S. Sternackiego, 1613.
- Odpowiedź na książkę X. Gurskiego, którą Wyjawieniem niewstydu ariańskiego nazwał. n.p., 1617.
- Refutatio libri de baptismo Martini Smiglecii jesuitae. Raków, 1617.
- Defensio animadversionum Fausti Socini, Raków: drukarnia S. Sternacki, 1618.
- with W. Smalcius, O pobudkach i środkach do połączenia się arianów z menonitami. Unpublished manuscript in the Acts of the Socinian Synod.

=== As editor ===
- Socyn, F. De statu primi hominis ante lapsum disputatio. Raków: drukarnia S. Sternackiego, 1610.
- Socyn, F. Explcationes et paraphrases variorum scripturae locorum. Raków, 1614
- Socyn, F. Concionis Christi explicatio. Raków: drukarnia S. Sternackiego, 1616.
- Socyn, F. Explcatio primae partis capitis Evangelii Joannis. Raków: drukarnia S. Sternackiego, 1618.
- Disputatio Joannis Stoienscii cum Joanne Maria carmelita. Raków: drukarnia S. Sternackiego, 1618.

=== Disputed authorship ===
- Philopolites, to jest Miłośnik Ojczyzny, albo o powinności dobrego obywatela, ojczyźnie dobrze chcącego i onę miłującego, krótki traktat. Kraków, 1588.
- Katechizm zboru tych ludzi, którzy.... Raków, 1605; new ed., Raków, 1619.
  - The so-called Racovian Catechism. Moskorzowski is the author of the dedication to James I of England in the English translation of the Cathecism.
- Zawstydzenie księdza Skargi abo animadversie na książkę księdza Skargi, jezuity, którą zawstydzeniem arianów nazwał. Raków, 1606.
  - Most likely, the author is Valentinus Smalcius, but in Moskorzowski claims authorship in Refutatio Appendicis, quam Martinus Smiglecius jesuita... Hieronimo Moscorovio opposuit.
- Wtóre zawstydzenie x. Skargi abo odpis na potworną książkę jego której dał tytuł: "Mesyasz nowych arianów wedle Alkoranu tureckiego... Roku 1615". n.p., n.d.
  - Authorship attributed by Estreicher.

== Bibliography ==
- Bibliografia Literatury Polskiej – Nowy Korbut, vol. 2 Piśmiennictwo Staropolskie, 542–44. Warszawa: Państwowy Instytut Wydawniczy, 1964.
- Chmaj, L. Bracia Polscy - Ludzie, idee, wpływy. Warszawa: PWN, 1957.
- Pasierbiński, Tadeusz. Hieronim z Moskorzowa Moskorzowski. Warszawa, 1931.
- Tync, S. "Wyższa szkoła braci polskich w Rakowie. Zarys jej dziejów (1602-1638)." In Studia nad arianizmem. Warszawa, 1959.
