= Gilbert Clerke =

British mathematician and philosopher

Gilbert Clerke (1626 – c. 1697) was an English mathematician, natural philosopher and Socinian theological writer.

== Life ==
Born at Uppingham, Rutland, in 1626, he was a son of John Clerke, master of the school there. In 1641 he was admitted to Sidney Sussex College, Cambridge, and there he proceeded M.A., being elected a fellow in 1648. In 1651 he received presbyterian ordination; he became proctor also in the next year, 1652; but in 1655 he resigned his fellowship and left the university, because the statutes required him to take the degree of Bachelor of Divinity, and his conscientious scruples made this impossible.

His ability brought him into communication with Richard Cumberland, his contemporary at Cambridge, and with William Whiston; but, inheriting a small property at Loddington, Northamptonshire, he quietly pursued his mathematical studies in that county to the end of his life. He did approach Isaac Newton for some clarification of the Principia. His directions to find the meridian relate to observations taken at Stamford, where Whiston knew him. He laid out the gardens of Lamport Hall.

The manner and the time of his death are not recorded. He is supposed to have died about 1697.

== Works ==
In 1660 he issued his first work, De Plenitudine Mundi. In this he reviewed René Descartes and attacked Francis Bacon, Thomas Hobbes, and Seth Ward. In the next year he was following the lines of Torricelli and Robert Boyle; and, dedicating the resulting work to Sir Justinian Isham, he brought it out in 1662 as Tractatus de Restitutione Corporum, which replied to Francis Line. Another work of his was Finalis Concordia, alluded to by him in some correspondence with Richard Baxter on church divisions.

In 1682 he published his expansion of William Oughtred's Clavis Mathematica with the title Oughtredus explicatus, with part i. dedicated to Isham, part ii. to Sir Walter Chetwynd. In this work Clerke spoke of his invention of the spot-dial. He published his Description of it in 1687, this being the only work he wrote in English.

In 1695 appeared Tractatus tres; quorum qui prior Ante-Nicenismus dicitur, a Unitarian answer to George Bull's Nicene writings, the first two of these being by Clerke and the third anonymous. He is credited with all three by some writers, while others take from him the two to which he put his name and attribute them all to Samuel Crellius (1661–1747). Clerke's position as an original theologian is also questioned; it has been thought he merely reproduced Daniel Zwicker's arguments. Clerke did not suffer the fate of Socinians William Freke (1694) and John Smith (1695) who were forced to recant.
