= Johann Ludwig von Wolzogen =

Austrian nobleman and Socinian theologian

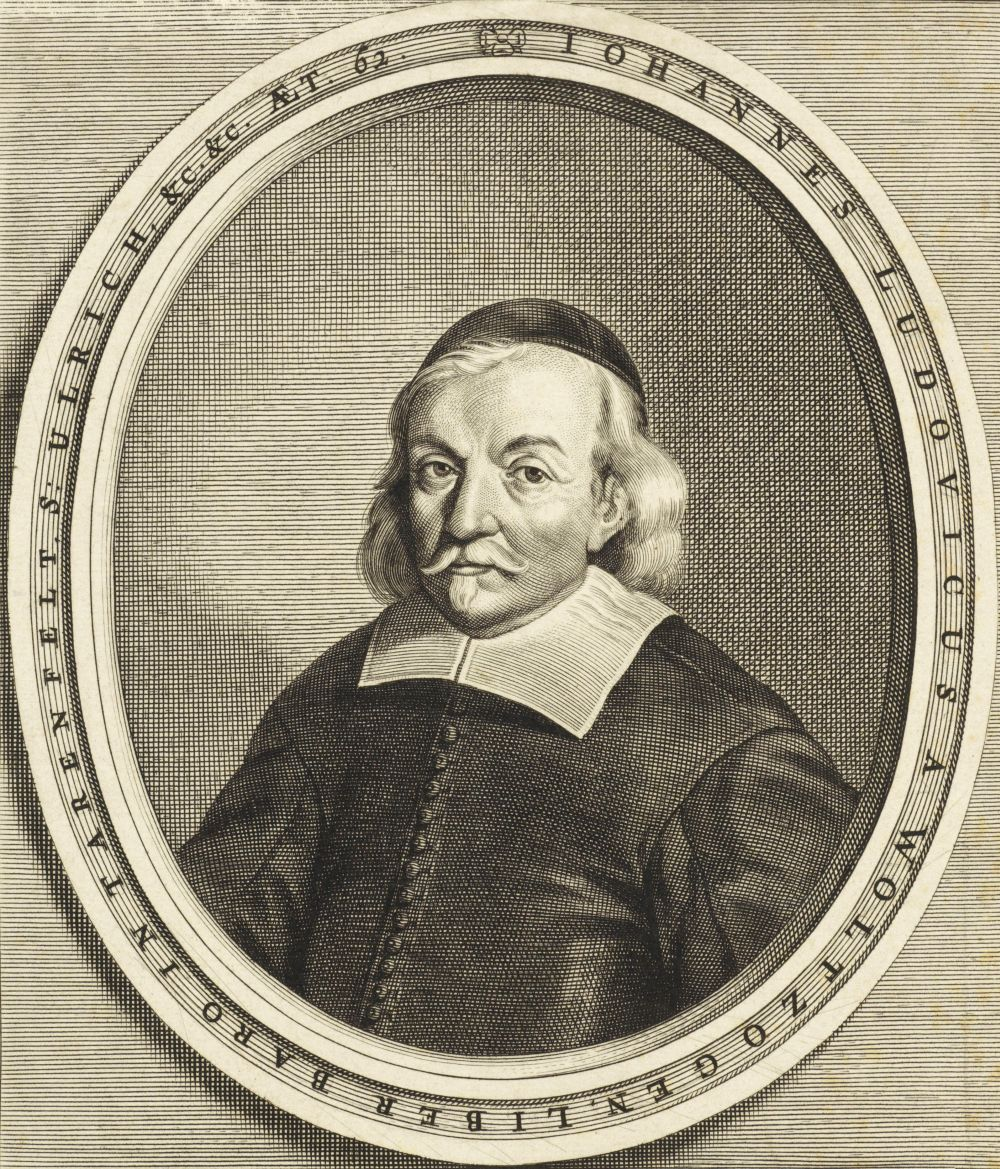
Johann Ludwig von Wolzogen

Johann Ludwig von Wolzogen Freiherr zu Neuhuas Freiherr auf Fahrenfeldt (1599–1661) was an Austrian nobleman and Socinian theologian.

Wolzogen was born in Nové Zámky (modern Slovakia), known then as Neuhäusel in German and Érsekújvár in Hungarian. He inherited the titles of Baron of Tarenfeldt and Freiherr of Neuhäusel.

Comenius became acquainted with Wolzogen in 1638. And Wolzogen took issue with the followers of Descartes. Wolzogen was a distinguished exegete, and, besides his Bible commentaries, wrote a Compendium religionis Christianae and a criticism of the doctrine of the Trinity . Among the early Unitarians Wolzogen is among those noted for his uncompromising preaching of pacifism. along with Joachim Stegmann and Daniel Zwicker.

He died in Silesia.

== Works ==
=== Translations from French to Polish by Wolzogen ===
- Johann Ludwig Wolzogen - Uwagi do medytacji metafizycznych René Descartes'a (Polish)

=== Posthumous ===
- Biblioteca Fratrum Polonorum Vol.vii-viii Johannis Ludovici Wolzogenii Baronis Austriaci : Opera omnia, exegetica, didacteca, et polemica, Quorum Seriem versa pagina exhibet, Cum indicibus necessariis. Frans Kuyper Amsterdam 1668
- De Scripturarum interprete adversus exercitatorem paradoxum libri duo 1668

== Online edition ==
- Bibliotheca Fratrum Polonorum Online
