= Piotr Stoiński Jr. =

Polish Unitarian writer (1565–1605)

Piotr Stoiński Jr. (1565-1605) was a Polish Socinian Unitarian writer.

Piotr was the son of Pierre Statorius (in Polish also Piotr Stoiński) the French Unitarian grammarian who emigrated to Poland wrote the first grammar of Polish. He was born and died in Raków, Kielce county, studied and taught at the Racovian Academy and helped draft the Racovian Catechism.

== Works ==
- Debate with Franovius in Lusławice on the pre-existence of Christ (1591)
- Debate with the Jesuit Adrian Radzimiński in Lublin (1592)
- Confession of Faith, Lublin (1593)
- Transcript of the conference with Andreas Wiszowaty on the preexistence of Jesus before the birth of Mary (1593)
- Debate with John Petricius (12 December 1592)
- Polish translation of the answers of his uncle Fausto Sozzini (1592)
- A defence of the teaching of Fausto Sozzini on the nature and manner of our salvation
- An appeal to Evangelical (i.e. Calvinist) Ministers
- An answer to Martin Smiglecius (1595-1596)
- Polish translation of the Evidences of Socinus
- Funeral oration for Socinus (1604)
- Sermons
