= Krzysztof Crell-Spinowski =

Arian theologian (1622–1680)

Krzysztof Crell-Spinowski (Latin: Crellius Spinovius, English: Christopher Crell) (Raków, Kielce County 1622 - December 12, 1680) was an Arian theologian, pastor of the church of the Polish Brethren.

Christopher Crellius was the middle generation of three Socinian theologians: he was son of Johannes Crellius, and father of Samuel Crellius-Spinowski. Krzysztof Crell-Spinowski was educated first where he was born, at the Racovian Academy, then following the forced closure of the Racovian Academy in 1639, at the University of Leiden.

After his return to Poland, from 1650 he was a preacher in Krzelów, then 1654-1659 minister in Rąbkowa, then at Kluczbork in Silesia where his sons Christopher Jr. (1658) and Samuel (1660) were born, and his wife died (1666), and where from his second marriage a third son Paweł (1677) was born. In 1669, Krzysztof Sr. moved as minister and teacher to Kosinowo. He completed the editing and printing of works of his father in Amsterdam. During his trips abroad to the Netherlands and England he sought material assistance for exiled Arians. He died on the way home from Kosinowo to Kluczbork.

While his second and third sons followed their father's work as ministers in Lithuania, the firstborn, Christopher Crell Jr, accompanied his widowed father to England in 1668 at the age of 10 with his sister, and was left in the care of a spinster, Miss Alice Stuckey. Christoph Jr. later studied, like his father, at Leiden, where he graduated in medicine 6 July 1682, with a thesis on bladder stones. His son and namesake went on to become a licentiate of the Royal College of Physicians in London on 2 April 1683.
