= Pierzchała coat of arms =

Polish coat of arms

Pierzchała
- Battle cry: Pirzchała, Trzaska
- Alternative names: Kolumna, Pirch, Pirzchała, Roch, Trzaski
- Earliest mention: 1344 (seal), 1409 (record)
- Families: 138 names B Babiłło, Baliszewski, Berliński, Białyszewski, Bielamowski, Bielanowski, Bielecki, Bielicki, Bieniewski, Bogatko, Borusewicz, Bruleński. C Chobołtowski, Chobółtowski, Chraplewski, Ciosnowski, Czosnowski. D Dauksza, Dawksza, Dawkszewicz, Dowksza, Duksza, Dukszta, Dzierzek, Dzięgielewski. G Galicki, Garcimowicz, Gnatowicz, Gnatowski, Głowieński, Głowiński, Gołowiński, Grabicki, Grabie, Grodecki, Guzowski. H Harackiewicz, Hatowski, Hatto, Hattowski, Hołowczyc, Horackiewicz, Hruszewski. J Jabłonowski. K Kamelski, Kimunt, Klembowski, Kluski, Kłębowski, Kobylski, Koczowski, Kordziukow, Korzuchowski, Kowalewski, Kożuchowski, Kuchcicki, Kuchciński, Kula, Kunczewicz, Kuńczewicz. L Larysz, Larysza, Leśniewski, Leśniowski, Liwski, Lucławski, Lusławski. Ł Łaźniewski, Łaźniowski, Łażniewski, Łącki, Łobod, Łoboda. M Mieczkowski, Miński, Miszczeński, Montwił, Montwiłło, Montywiłło, Motewidłow, Myszczeński, Myszczyński. N Nadolski, Nowosielski. O Omeljanowicz, Oborski Ossowski. P Paskowski, Pawłowski, Penski, Perkowski, Pęczycki, Pęczyński, Pęski, Piasecki, Pierzchajło, Pierzchało, Pierzkiewicz, Pieszkiewicz, Pirch, Pogroszewski, Poniński, Popowski, Poroski, Priami, Pruszkowski, Pryami, Przeciszewski, Przekuleja, Przezdziecki. R Radomiński, Roch, Roch2, Rochalski, Rowiński, Rudnicki. S Sabin, Serocki, Sieniecki, Sierocki, Skorupski, Sobolewski, Sokołowski, Sperski, Suzin, Szabin, Szeligowski, Szumlański. T Tokarski, Turowicz. U Umiastowski. W Wiszowaty, Witkowski, Wittan, Wiwulski, Włodkowski, Włoszczowski, Wojnowski, Wygura, Wysocki, Wyszowaty. Z Zawadzki.

Pierzchała (Roch) is a Polish coat of arms. It was used by several szlachta families in the times of the Kingdom of Poland and the Polish–Lithuanian Commonwealth.

== History ==
One of the oldest Polish coats of arms. According to most heraldists, the proper name of it is "Pierzchała" (Pirzchała), recorded in 1409. The word "Roch" is Polish for the heraldic emblem: the rook, it was later used as the name (recorded in 1422).

== Notable bearers ==
Notable bearers of this coat of arms include:

- Klemens Pierzchała, Bishop of Płock
- House of Walewski
  - Marie Walewska
  - Alexandre Joseph Colonna, Count Walewski
- House of Wiszowaty
  - Andrzej Wiszowaty
  - Benedykt Wiszowaty
  - Andrzej Wiszowaty, Jr.
- Oborski family
  - pl:Kategoria:Oborscy herbu Pierzchała

== Gallery ==
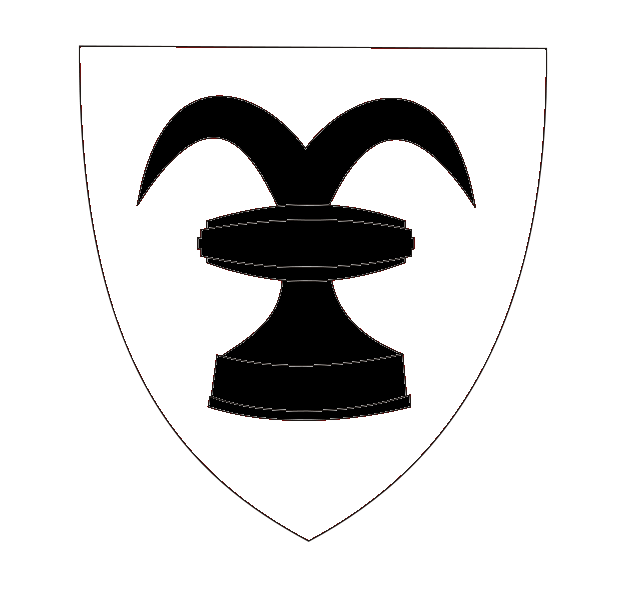
Pierzchała or Roch variation 1461

Pierzchała or Roch variation 1461

Variation

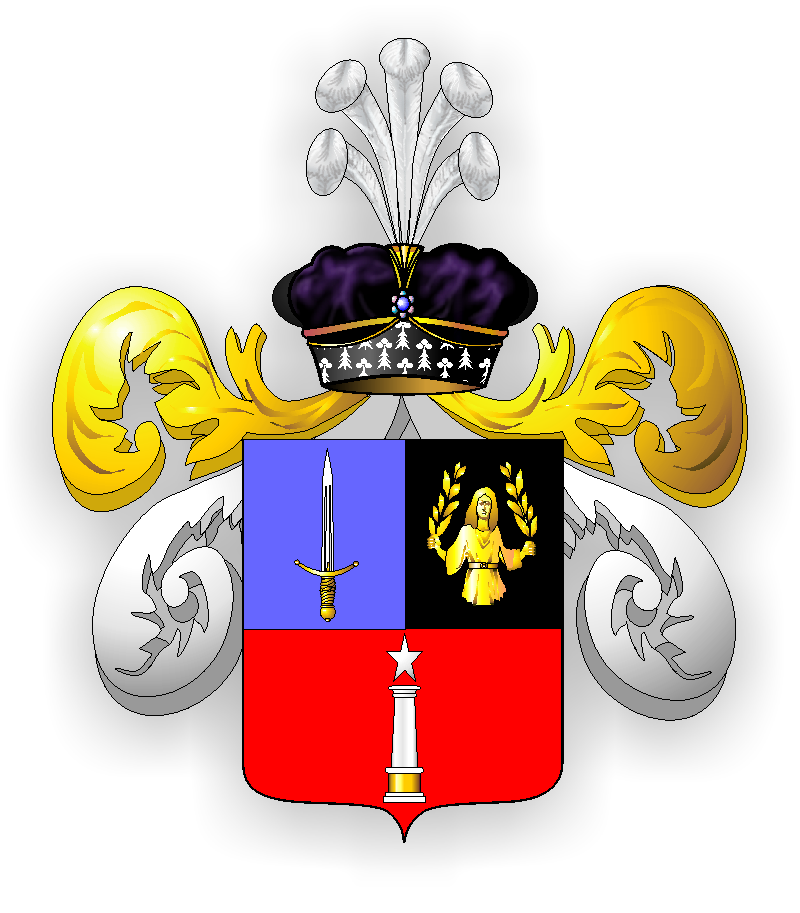
Count Colonna-Walewski

== See also ==
- Polish heraldry
- Heraldic family
- List of Polish nobility coats of arms

== Related coat of arms ==
- Roch III coat of arms
- Wysocki coat of arms

== Bibliography ==
- Juliusz Karol Ostrowski Księga herbowa rodów polskich. Warszawa, 1897-1906.
- Ludwik Pierzchała Herb Pierzchała, w: "Miesięcznik Heraldyczny", t. 1, Lwów 1908
- Ludwik Pierzchała Jeszcze herb Roch, w: "Miesięcznik Heraldyczny", nr 12, Warszawa 1932
- Józef Szymański Herbarz średniowiecznego rycerstwa polskiego. Wydawnictwo Naukowe PWN, Warszawa 1993.
- Marcin Michał Wiszowaty Słoń bojowy a sprawa polska w: "Verbum Nobile. Pismo środowiska szlacheckiego" nr 11/1997.
- Gert Oswald Lexikon der Heraldik. Bibliographisches Institut, Leipzig, 1984, ISBN 3-411-02149-7
