= Joachim Stegmann =

German Socinian theologian, Bible translator, mathematician and rector

Joachim Stegmann Sr. (1595 – 1633) was a German Socinian theologian, Bible translator, mathematician and rector of the Racovian Academy.

Stegmann was born in Potsdam, and was a Lutheran pastor in Brandenburg, but from 1626 he began to openly profess their ideas of Fausto Paolo Sozzini and moved to Poland, where he began working in the centers of the Polish Brethren. He was a teacher and rector of the Racovian Academy and contributed to the prosperity of the university.

In 1630 he collaborated with Johannes Crellius on the publication of German version of the Racovian New Testament.

He was chosen by the Polish Brethren community to go to Transylvania in 1633 to serve the "Arian" (Socinian) community among the Hungarian-speaking Unitarians there but died shortly after arrival in Cluj-Napoca.

== Works ==
- Textbook for mathematics and geometry.
- Brevis disquisitio an et quo mado vulgo dicti Evangelici Pontificios, ac nominatim Val. Magni de Acatholicorum credendi regula judicium solide atque evidenter refutare queant., Eleutheropoli (Amsterdam) 1633 (English translation London 1653).
- He worked with Andrzej Wiszowaty on the Racovian Catechism of 1605.

== Other members of his family ==
- Joachim Stegmann Jr. (1618–1678), his son, writer
- Krzysztof Stegmann (c.1624-c.1661), Socinian teacher.
- Wawrzyniec Stegmann (c.1610-c.1655), last rector of the Racovian Academy.
