= Racovian Academy =

17th-century Socinian school in Poland

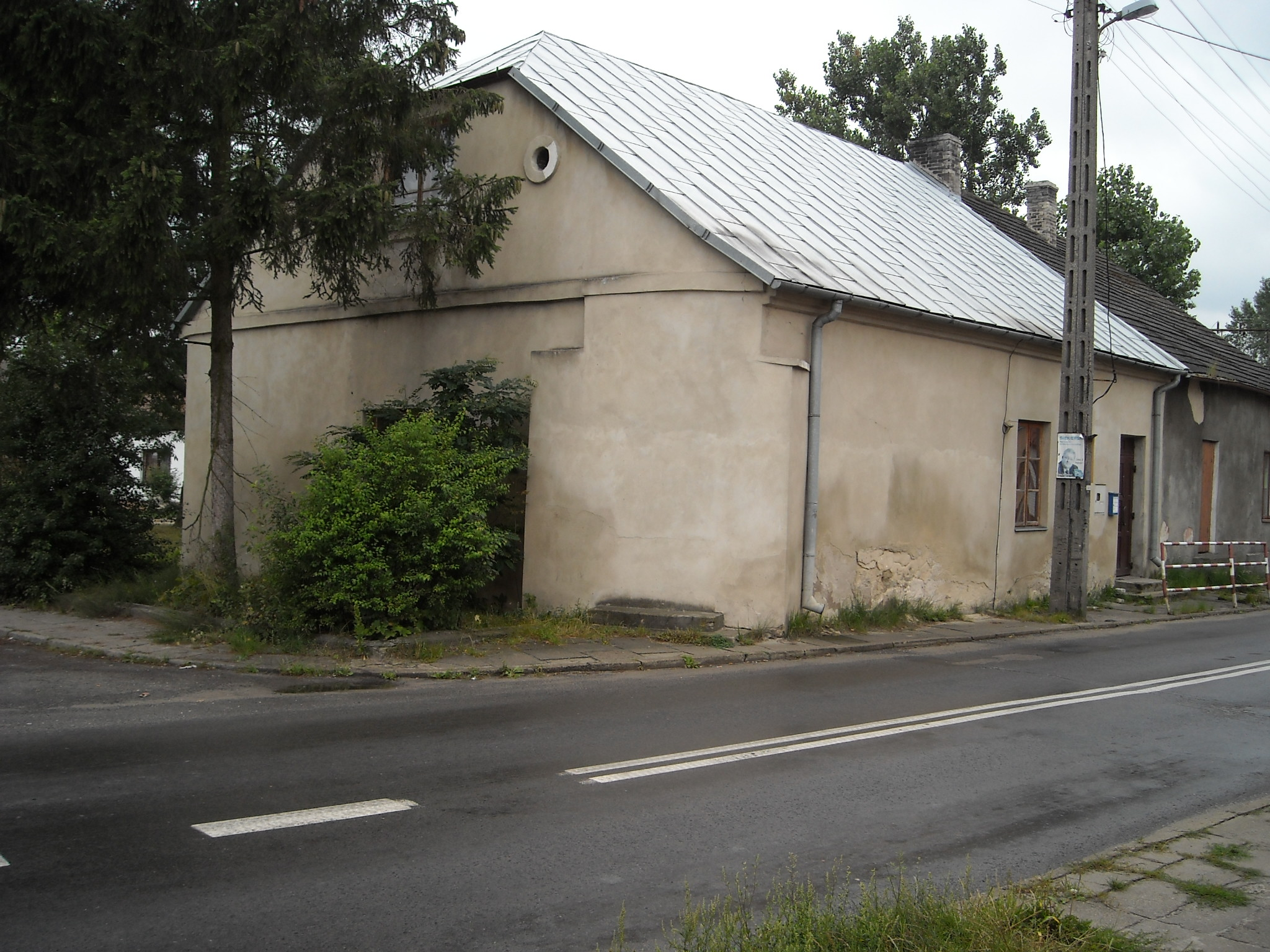
Former house of the Polish brethren (Sienieńskiego street 6); currently a library and a home of a Society of Friends of Raków

The Racovian Academy (Latin: Gymnasium Bonarum Artium) was a Socinian school operated from 1602 to 1638 by the Polish Brethren in Raków, Sandomierz Voivodeship of Lesser Poland. The communitarian Arian settlement of Raków was founded in 1569 by Jan Sienieński. The academy was founded in 1602 by his son, Jakub Sienieński. The zenith of the academy was 1616–1630. It was contemporaneous with the Calvinist Pińczów Academy, which was known "as the Sarmatian Athens". It numbered more than 1,000 students, including many foreigners. At this point it is estimated that ten to twenty percent of Polish intellectuals were Arians.

The end of the Academy in 1638 was occasioned by the pretext of the alleged destruction of a roadside cross, by several students of the Academy, while on tour accompanied by a teacher Paludiusa Solomon. Jakub Zadzik, bishop of Kraków, Jerzy Ossoliński, voivode of Sandomierz, and Honorato Visconti, papal nuncio, forced the closure of the Academy and the destruction of all buildings by sentence of the Sejm in April 1638. Most of the teaching staff and students went into exile in Transylvania or the Netherlands.

== Staff of the Academy ==
- Jakub Sienieński (d. 1639) – founder and administrator.

Rectors:

- Krzysztof Brockajus – rector 1602–1610
- Paweł Krokier – rector 1610–1616
- Johannes Crellius, German – rector 1616–1621
- Marcin Ruar, German (Martin Ruarius) – rector 1621–1622
- Joachim Stegmann Sr., German, – rector 1627?–1630?
- Wawrzyniec Stegmann – rector 1634–1638

Teaching staff, in alphabetical order:

- Giovanni Battista de Cetis, Italian.
- Adam Gosławski (1577–1642)
- Jan Licinius, linguist
- Andrzej Lubieniecki Sr. (1521–1623)
- Stanisław Lubieniecki Sr. (c.1558–1633)
- Krzysztof Morsztyn Jr. (c. 1570? – 1642), son of Krzysztof Morsztyn Sr. (1522–1600)
- Hieronim Moskorzowski (1560–1625) – Racovian Catechism, 1605
- Salomon Paludius
- Piotr Stoiński Jr. (1565–1605), son of Pierre Statorius (known in Poland as Piotr Stoiński Sr. 1530–1591)
- Valentinus Smalcius, German (born Valentin Schmalz) (1572–1622) – The Raków New Testament 1606
- Jonasz Szlichtyng (1592–1661)
- Johannes Völkel, German (?–1618)
- Andrzej Wiszowaty (1608–1678)
- Andrzej Wojdowski (1565–1622)

Notable students at the academy, who became writers in the exile:

- Christopher Crellius (1622–1680), son of Johannes Crellius and father of Samuel Crellius and Dr. Christopher Crell of London.
- Andrzej Lubieniecki the younger (1590–1667), historian.
- Stanisław Lubieniecki the younger (1623–1675), astronomer, nephew of Andrzej Lubieniecki.

== Influence ==
See also main articles on Polish Brethren and Socinianism

The Racovian Academy served as a centre for the propagation of Socinian belief in both western and eastern Europe, in particular the Arian mission to the University of Altdorf near Nuremberg (1615), Dutch Remonstrants, Unitarians in Transylvania, even Muscovite sympathizers with Judaism.

The publications of the Academy till 1639, and of those of the teachers of the Academy in exile after 1640, are known to have influenced many English Unitarians such as Bartholomew Legatt (1575?–1612), Edward Wightman (1566–1612) and Gilbert Clerke (1626 – c. 1697) as well as Isaac Newton (1643–1727), and Voltaire (1694–1778),
