= Wawrzyniec Stegmann =

Wawrzyniec Stegmann (c. 1610 - c. 1655; Latin name Laurentius Tribander) was a Polish Arian scholar, and the last rector of the Racovian Academy from 1634 to 1638.

It has been suggested that the Latin name Tribander for Stegmann was to protect the school, but the pen name Tribander is transparent and was used by other members of the Stegmann family.
