= Marcin Krowicki =

Polish Catholic priest (1500–1573)

Marcin Krowicki (1500–1573) was a Polish Catholic priest who became a Calvinist in 1551 and a Unitarian in 1562. He was one of the translation team for the original Pińczów Bible. He was one of those who argued against a fully pacifist stance among the Polish Brethren. In 1561 he published Obraz własny antykrystów identifying the Catholic Church as the antichrist. He then became a schoolteacher in Podlasie.
