= Pierre Statorius =

French-Polish translator, grammarian and theologian

Pierre Statorius, Polish: Piotr Stoiński, Piotr Stojeński (Tonneville, Seine-Maritime, 1530 – Pińczów, or Kraków 1591) was a French grammarian and theologian, who settled among the Polish Brethren, becoming rector of a Calvinist Academy in Pińczów at the invitation of Francesco Lismanino.

The place of birth and real name of Statorius are difficult to establish. According to the letter of Théodore de Bèze of 12 July 1567, Statorius was a student of his. In the accounts of the Baillif of Lausanne Hans Frisching for 1550 appears "Pierre de Tonneville", who signed his Latin letters "P. Tonvillanus S." and claimed to have come from the "pays Séquanes" which indicates Tonneville, Seine-Maritime, not Thionville, Metz.

He is known in Poland as Piotr Stoiński Sr., (also Stojeński), to distinguish from his son, Piotr Stoiński Jr. (1565–1605) co-author of the Racovian Catechism and teacher at the Racovian Academy.

== Works ==
He was one of the team which produced the Brest Bible 1558–1563.

He wrote the first grammar of Polish, Polonicae grammatices institutio (1568).

== See also ==
- Stojeński family
