= Andrzej Lubieniecki =

Polish historian and priest

Andrzej Lubieniecki (1551–1623) was a Polish historian and priest. He was a member of the Polish Brethren.

== Selected works ==
- Poloneutichia, albo Królestwa solskiego szczęście [Poloneutichia, or, The Happiness of the Polish Kingdom] (in Polish). 1616.
