= Olbrycht Karmanowski =

Olbrycht Karmanowski (born circa 1580, died after 1632) was a Polish nobleman, member of Polish Brethren Church, courtier, poet and translator. He was a minor poet of the late Polish Renaissance and Baroque eras.

== Biography ==
Olbrycht Karmanowski was born into a family of noblemen. Information about his life is scanty. His coat of arms was Prus I. He was well educated, probably in schools at Raków and Lubartów. He also studied abroad. He took part in the Zebrzydowski Rebellion in 1607. He later became a courtier of the Lithuanian duke Krzysztof Radziwiłł the Younger (1585-1640). Among others, he was a supervisor of Radziwiłł's real estates.

== Works ==
Several of Olbrycht Karmanowski's poems remain known. Among these works is the cycle Pieśni pokutne (Penitential Hymns). His most well-known poem is Olbrycht Karmanowski Piotrowi Kochanowskiemu, autorowi przełożenia "Gofreda" (Olbrycht Karmanowski to Piotr Kochanowski, the translator of the Jerusalem Delivered 1618). Karmanowski's Pieśń 13. W chorobie (Canto 13. In an Illness) is notable as an early example of enneasyllable with caesura after the fifth syllable. This meter, introduced into Polish Renaissance verse by Jan Kochanowski but not much used before the 19th century, remains popular today. Karmanowski also used Sapphic stanzas in the poem O śmierci (On Death). Karmanowski was also a translator of verse, including poems by Anacreon and Ovid.

== Criticism ==
- Janusz Ziembiński, Twórczość poetycka Olbrychta Karmanowskiego [Olbrycht Karmanowski's literary work], University of Silesia in Katowice, Katowice 2010.

== Bibliography ==
- Olbrycht Karmanowski, Wiersze i listy [Poems and letters], edited by Radosław Grześkowiak, Institute of Literary Research and Pro Cultura Litteraria, Warsaw 2010.
