= Marcin Ruar =

German theologian

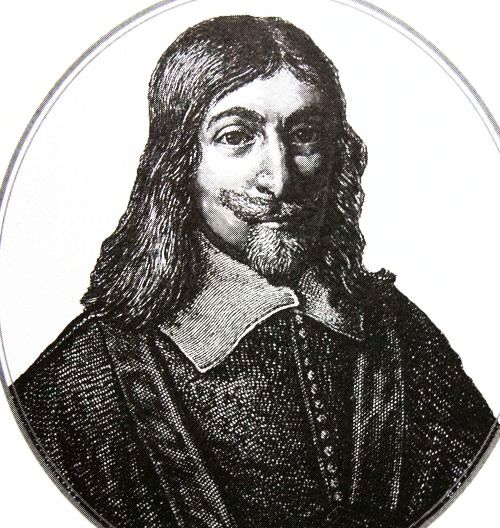
Marcin Ruar

Marcin Ruar (German: Martin Ruar; Latin: Ruarius; pseudonym: Aretius Crispinus; 1589–1657) was a German Socinian theologian, advocate of religious tolerance, and rector of the Racovian Academy from 1620 to 1622.

== Biography ==
Ruar was born in Krempe, Holstein, the son of a Lutheran preacher. He studied in Altdorf, where he became acquainted with and adopted the non-trinitarian of Fausto Sozzini, and then studied law at Leiden. He was a polyglot making frequent travels through Denmark, France, Italy, the Netherlands and the countries of Germany, promoting non-trinitarian teaching and pleas for tolerance, publishing and earning a reputation as one of the most educated men of his era. He was offered a professorship at Cambridge, but rejected the proposal, due to the requirement to acknowledge the Trinity. He moved to Poland in 1614 and was appointed rector of the Racovian Academy for three years in the 1620s, but resigned because of the burdens of the teaching and administration.

In 1631, Ruar moved to Gdańsk, where he was a minister in the German-speaking Socinian congregation. Known for his humanist and liberal views, Ruar was not doctrinaire and tried to reconcile Socinians with the Mennonite Remonstrants. Journeying to the Netherlands Ruar established contacts between the Polish Arians and the Dutch Remonstrant movement and with Jacobus Arminius. However his position against the Trinity remained clear, as in extensive correspondence with Remonstrants, such as the minister of Hazerswoude, Samuel Naeranus, on the Trinity.

In 1643 Ruar had married the daughter of Martin Voss, from a well-off and prominent Gdańsk family and converted his wife, her family, friends and many citizens. These conversions did not escape the attentions of the city council, most of whom belonged to the local Lutheran Church. Following the 1638 decision of the Sejm which drove the Polish brethren from Raków and closed the Racovian Academy, the Gdańsk city council moved to exile Ruar. However, as a lawyer Ruar demanded an official trial, appealing to the support of the Polish magnates who were patrons of the Polish Brethren. Ruar argued that the doctrine of his faith, wrongly called "Arianism," was in reality based on the Bible. The city council relented, providing Ruar was to cease converting Lutherans. After five years Ruar received from King Władysław IV Vasa a certificate of immunity, and began again to convert Lutheran burghers of the city, which in 1643 resulted in a further banishment from Gdańsk - with his father in law Voss, the doctor Florian Crusius, Daniel Zwicker, the secretary of the council Ladebach and the eighty-year-old barber Werner David Buttel, with their families.

Ruar initially went to Warsaw, where he tried to gain support for the Socinian cause, arguing that his deportation was the beginning of religious persecution in Poland. Although he was conditionally allowed to return to Gdańsk, henceforth Ruar preferred to live outside the city, in Straszyn, where he spent the rest of his life, writing, preaching, corresponding with the congregation in Gdansk, and with scholars abroad under the protection of the hetman Stanisław Koniecpolski. During this period he again travelled widely and freely, visiting England and Italy. He died in 1657 in Straszyn.

Ruar was an advocate of separation of church authority from natural sciences. In 1643, Marin Mersenne, sought from a J. Fabricius (a student from Gdańsk in Paris, apparently no relation to the astronomer), a Socinian with whom Mersenne could correspond concerning the Copernican heliocentrism of Pierre Gassendi, and was introduced to Ruar. However Ruar was already familiar with Gassendi's works, and replied to Mersenne that such matters should be left to science, not wait the adjudication of the church.
