= Sandomierz Agreement =

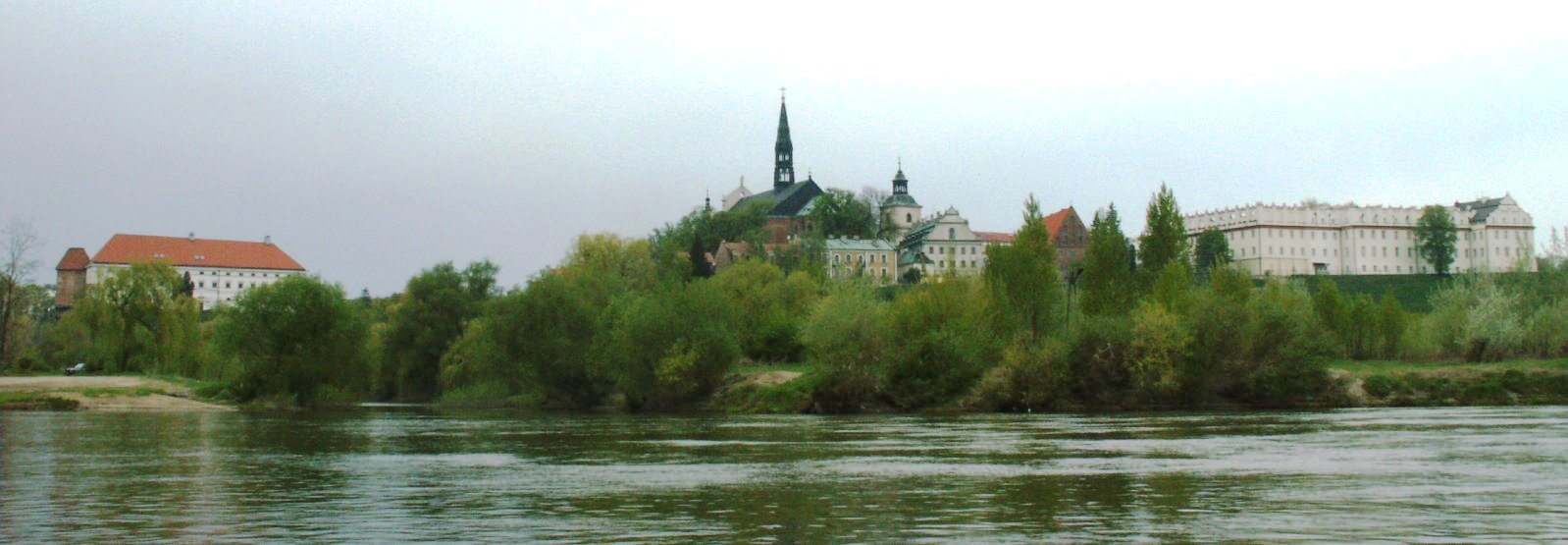
Sandomierz, where the agreement was signed

The Sandomierz Agreement (or Sandomierz Consensus; Lat. Consensus Sendomiriensis) was an agreement reached in 1570 in Sandomierz between a number of Protestant groups in the Polish–Lithuanian Commonwealth. It was intended to unite different creeds of the Protestant Reformation, such as the Calvinists, the Lutherans, and the Bohemian Brethren, and to face Counter-Reformation as a united front. The Polish Brethren did not participate in the talks that resulted in the agreement, signed on April 14, 1570. Signatories of the consensus agreed to respect each other's preachers and sacraments. Furthermore, united synods were planned. The idea of a parliament bill was raised, in which Protestants were to be treated on equal terms with Catholics.

By the mid-1550s, the Protestant Reformation was accepted by several members of the nobility in Lesser Poland. They, however, were deeply divided, which made it impossible to create a national Protestant church of Poland. Facing counter-reformation, Jan Laski came with the idea of a united front, but it turned out to be a failure, when in the 1560s, the radical movement of the Polish Brethren emerged, dividing the Calvinists. Due to efforts of Laski and Feliks Krzyzak, the agreement between the Calvinists and the Bohemian Brethren was signed in 1555 in Kozminek. Due to several dogmatic differences the agreement formally existed only for ten years.

In 1565, at a synod in Gostyn, Greater Poland, the idea of unification of Protestant churches in the Kingdom of Poland was raised once again. The synod turned out to be another failure, and another meeting of the Protestant nobility took place in early April 1570 in Sandomierz. The Polish Brethren did not participate in it, so after lengthy discussion, Protestant activists decided to expel the Brethren from their community. Each creed retained its ceremonies, and all participants pledged to cooperate with each other, and to invite each other to synods.

In the province of Lesser Poland, Feliks Krzyzak emerged as a leader of Protestant communities. In Greater Poland, this task was taken over by Erazm Gliczner, while leaders of the local Bohemian Brethren were Jakub Ostrorog and Rafal Leszczynski. In the Grand Duchy of Lithuania, the Protestants were led by Szymon Zaciusz.

The expansion of both Bohemian and Polish Brethren was stopped after 1577, and in the late 16th century, the Roman Catholic church managed to weaken the influence of the Calvinists in the Polish–Lithuanian Commonwealth. In the first half of the 17th century, the number of Calvinist prayer houses in Lesser Poland was reduced from 260 to 155. The only Protestant creed that retained its position was Lutheran Church, which was very strong among German-speaking residents of Royal Prussia.

== Sources ==
- Ugoda sandomierska wzmocniła pozycję protestantów wobec katolicyzmu
