= Summa Universae Theologiae Christianae secundum Unitarios =

1762 document on the faith of Romanian Unitarian Christians, published after persecution

Summa Universae Theologiae Christianae secundum Unitarios (English A Digest of Christian Theology according to the Unitarians) is a statement of faith of the Unitarian Church of Transylvania officially recognised by Joseph II in 1782.

The subtitle is in Usum Auditorum Theologiae concinnata et edita (English: Compiled and published for the use of students of theology).

The work is traditionally ascribed to Mihály Lombard de Szentábrahám (1737–1758), who revitalized the church after a period of persecution during the 18th century. It remains the official statement of faith of the Unitarian Church in Transylvania, though since the 19th century subscription to it is no longer required.

== Theology ==
The document is basically Socinian (as the Racovian Catechism) with Arminian modifications.

The characteristic Christology of Laelio Sozzini, denying the pre-existence of Christ but accepting the virgin birth, distinguishes the document from the more progressive Unitarianism of Joseph Priestley (after Institutes of Natural and Revealed Religion 1772) and Thomas Belsham.
