= Krzysztof Morsztyn Sr. =

Founder of the Polish Brethren community (1522–1600)

Leliwa coat of arms

Krzysztof Morsztyn Sr. (1522–1600) of the Leliwa coat of arms, was founder of the Polish Brethren community in Filipów in 1585.

He was father of:

- Krzysztof Morsztyn Jr. (c.1580–1642) who taught at the Racovian Academy.
- Elżbieta Morsztyn who married Fausto Sozzini in 1586, but died within a year, after giving birth to a daughter, Agnieszka Sozzini, later mother of Andrzej Wiszowaty.
