= John Sigismund Unitarian Highschool =

- János Zsigmond Unitárius Kollégium; Liceul Unitarian "János Zsigmond"
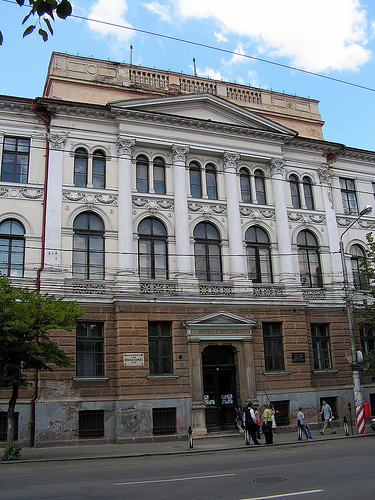
- Front view of the John Sigismund Unitarian Highschool

Location
- Bulevardul 21 Decembrie, Nr. 9 Cluj-Napoca, Cluj County 400105; Romania
- Coordinates: 46°46′18″N 23°35′32″E

Information
- Funding type: Public
- Established: 1557; 469 years ago
- Language: Hungarian
- Website: www.janoszsigmond.ro

The John Sigismund Unitarian Highschool (Hungarian: János Zsigmond Unitárius Kollégium; Romanian: Liceul Unitarian "János Zsigmond"), located at 9, 21 December Boulevard, Cluj-Napoca (formerly Kolozsvár), Romania, was a theological school founded in 1557 by the Unitarian Diocese of Transylvania.

== Foundation ==
The Diet of Torda (1557) established three schools in the former monasteries of Kolozsvár (Cluj-Napoca), Marosvásárhely (Târgu Mureş) and Nagyvárad (Oradea). Queen Isabella, regent for the infant John Sigismund, granted the school in Kolozsvár the annual sum of 100 forints. The then Lutheran Ferenc Dávid was appointed rector but shortly afterwards he converted to Calvinism (1564–1567) and then Anti–trinitarianism, and from 1568 Unitarianism. His son-in-law Johann Sommer was moderator of the Academy. In the next generation György Enyedi was moderator of the Academy.

== Habsburg Rule ==
When Transylvania fell under Habsburg rule the Diploma Leopoldinum (1690) granted the rights of all four received Christian denominations (religio recepta): Catholic, Augustan (Lutheran), Helvetic (Reformed Church in Hungary) and Unitarian and a process of re-Catholicisation followed. The building which had been used 1557–1693 for the Unitarian High School was returned to the Jesuits. The school moved to four buildings on the Town Square, nearby St. Michael’s Church which remained in Unitarian hands. However on 6 May 1697 most of Cluj-Napoca was destroyed in major fire - including the School. The school's rector was sent to the Netherlands to raise funds from Unitarian and Arminian supporters. Following the defeat of Francis II Rákóczi, the Catholic church finally regained possession of St. Michael’s Church, and in 1718 the recently rebuilt school buildings on the square. The school relocated to what is today 21 December St.

Andrzej Wiszowaty Jr., great-great grandson of Fausto Sozzini, taught at the college 1726-1740, during the period in the 1730s when the Unitarian Church was reorganized and strengthened by Mihály Lombard de Szentábrahám.

== 19th century ==
The school was rebuilt in baroque style in 1801, home today to the Healthcare School. A second house was added in 1887, giving the school 55 rooms. From 1850 the school had an average of 400 students, 200 of whom lodged in the dormitories, and 25 professors. Prominent Hungarian-speaking Unitarian alumni of the 19th century included Sámuel Brassai, poets Mihály Szentiváni and János Kriza, historians Elek Jakab and László Kővári, chemist Áron Berde and the writer Domokos Gyallai.

== Modern history ==
The present building next to the Unitarian Church, constructed in 1901, is the largest school building in Cluj-Napoca. Between 1950–1993 the school was renamed as the Sámuel Brassai School. In 1993 it was reopened and renamed in 2003 after John II Sigismund Zápolya, the first prince of the Principality of Transylvania.
