= Lusławice, Lesser Poland Voivodeship =

Lusławice
- Village
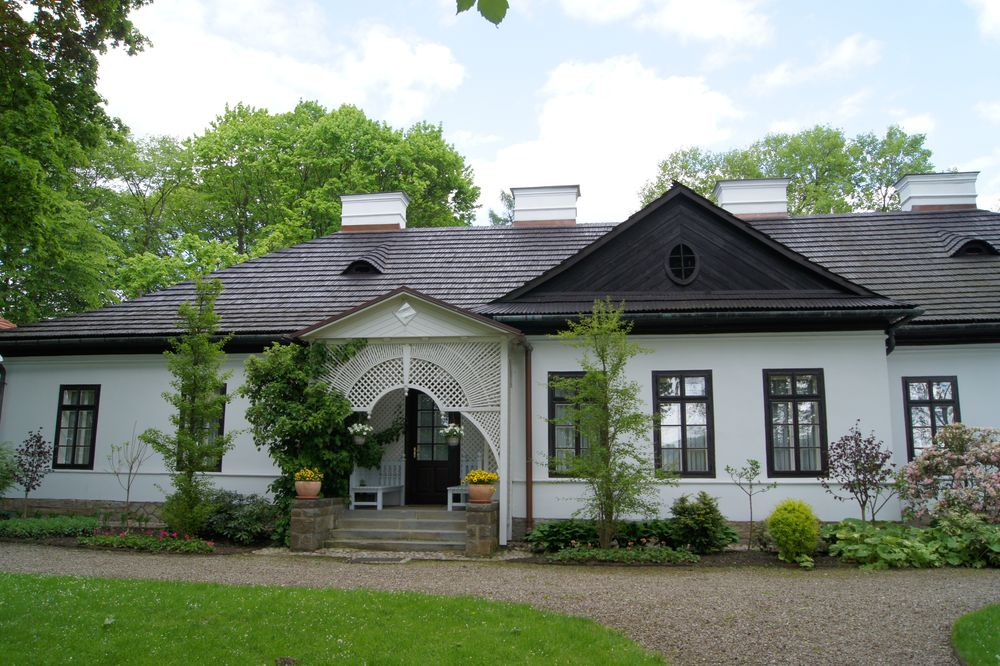
- Penderecki Manor in Lusławice

- Location within Poland
- Coordinates: 49°51′N 20°49′E
- Country: Poland
- Voivodeship: Lesser Poland
- County: Tarnów
- Gmina: Zakliczyn
- Elevation: 240 m (790 ft)

Population
  - Total: 920
- Postal code: 32-840
- Area code: +48 14
- Car plates: KTA
- Website: http://www.zakliczyn.com/wioski/luslawice.php

Lusławice [luswaˈvit͡sɛ] is a village in the administrative district of Gmina Zakliczyn, within Tarnów County, Lesser Poland Voivodeship, in southern Poland.

Between 1976 and 2020 (his death), Polish composer, Krzysztof Penderecki resided in Lusławice in a restored manor house.

== Tourist Attraction ==
Penderecki established an annual international music festival there. He also established an arboretum in a 30-hectare park near his residence containing around 2000 taxa of trees and shrubs from all over the world. In 2013, he opened the European Music Centre in Lusławice - an international academy of music. The centre has 650-seat concert hall and a lecture hall for master classes and workshops. Penderecki Centre plays a vital part in cultural influence on the region of Małopolska.

== History ==
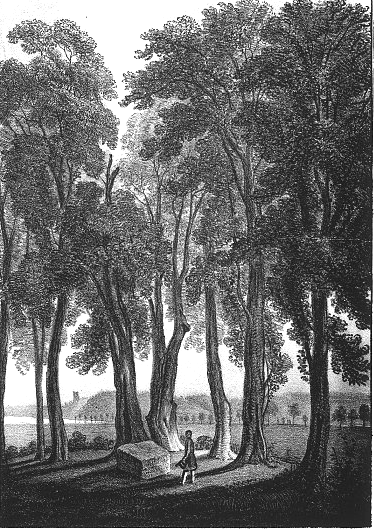
Tomb of Faustus Socinus in Lusławice

The village is the site of the grave of Fausto Sozzini.
