= Samuel Crellius =

Polish philosopher & theologian (1660–1747)

Samuel Crell-Spinowski (25 March 1660 in Kluczbork – 9 June 1747 in Amsterdam) was an Arian philosopher and theologian, pastor of the church of the Polish Brethren.

== Biography ==
Samuel Crellius was the son of Christopher Crellius and grandson of Johannes Crellius. Samuel's mother died when he was 6, and his father then took his older brother, Christopher, and one of his sisters to England. Samuel remained with his father in Poland, who later remarried and became father of Paul (1677). It is recorded that Samuel studied in England, but when Christopher Crell Sr. died in 1680 Samuel's elder brother Christopher Crell Jr. appears to have been not in England, but studying medicine in Leiden, and did not return to take up medicine in London till 1683.

Samuel was minister of the Socinian church in Lubniewice (from about 1706 and again from 1718) and Królowa Wola. In Prussia and Lithuania he served as a spiritual leader, as had Samuel Przypkowski and Zbigniew Morsztyn before him. He worked closely with his half-brother Paweł, 17 years his junior, who was a minister of the church in Kosinowo.

Samuel maintained contacts with representatives of the Reformation in England, Germany and the Netherlands, among others with John Locke, Isaac Newton and Anthony Ashley-Cooper, 3rd Earl of Shaftesbury, who was protector also of Paul Crell. Samuel Crell was the author of over 20 works of philosophy and theology in Latin, printed in Amsterdam, London and Königsberg. He died on 9 June 1747 in Amsterdam.

It is recorded in Polish sources that Samuel had two sons, who emigrated to Georgia, US, and spread Socinian teaching there.
