= Samuel Przypkowski =

Polish Socinian theologian

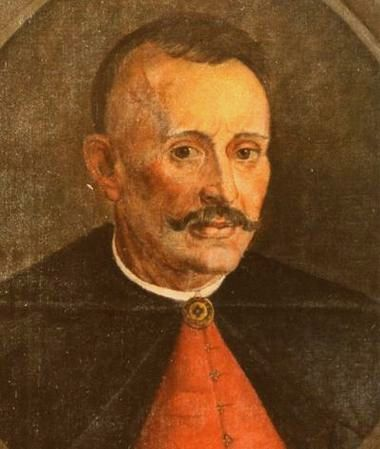
A modern portrait of Samuel Przypkowski by Janusz Podoski

Samuel Przypkowski (Przipcovius, Pripcovius) (1592–19 April 1670, Königsberg) was a Polish Socinian theologian, a leading figure in the Polish Brethren and an advocate of religious toleration. In Dissertatio de pace et concordia ecclesiae, published in 1628 in Amsterdam, he called for mutual tolerance by Christians. He was also a poet in Latin and Polish.

== Life ==
He studied at the University of Leiden and Altdorf, returning to Poland in the 1630s. He engaged in controversy with the Jesuit Szymon Starowolski concerning his Braterskie napomnienie ad dissidentes in religione (1644), and Daniel Zwicker.

He married Alexandra, daughter of Jerzy Czaplic.

== Works ==
- Dissertatio de pace (1628), English translation by John Dury
- Vita Fausti Socini, a life of Fausto Sozzini, English translation by John Biddle
- Cogitationes sacrae in Bibliotheca Fratrum Polonorum
- De iure Christiani magistratus et privatorum in belli pacisque negotiis (c. 1650)

The influence of his works was considerable, if obscured in Western Europe by anonymous publication (the Dissertatio was attributed to a 'Polish knight'); and 'Socinian' became for a period a by-word for the advocacy of tolerance. While there is an intellectual connection to John Locke and his Reasonableness of Christianity (1695), it is argued that Locke was not familiar with the Dissertation until after 1695. Like his English contemporaries generally, Locke was probably also unaware of the authorship of the work, commonly ascribed at the time to John Hales.

== Online edition ==
- Bibliotheca Fratrum Polonorum Online
