= Jakub Sienieński =

Polish nobleman

Jakub Sienieński (died 1639) was a Polish nobleman, representative in the Sejm, who in 1602 founded the Racovian Academy.

His father Jan Sienieński (d. 1599) founded the town of Raków, Kielce County in 1569. The family name, also written "z Sienny", is not of Italian descent (from Siena) but from Oleśnica.

In 1606-1609 Jakub supported the Zebrzydowski Rebellion against King Sigismund III Vasa who was attempting to weaken the Sejm and introduce a hereditary monarchy.
