= Racovian Catechism =

Nontrinitarian statement of Christian faith from the 17th century

The Racovian Catechism (Pol.: Katechizm Rakowski) is a nontrinitarian statement of faith from the 16th century. The title Racovian comes from the publishers, the Polish Brethren, who had founded a sizeable town in Raków, Kielce County, where the Racovian Academy and printing press was founded by Jakub Sienieński in 1602.

== Authors ==
The Polish Brethren or Ecclesia Minor were an antitrinitarian minority of the Reformed Church in Poland who had separated from the Calvinist majority, or Ecclesia Major, in 1565.

Several authors had a hand in drafting the Catechism: Valentinus Smalcius, Hieronim Moskorzowski, Johannes Völkel and others. It is likely that some of the text had been prepared by the Italian exile Fausto Sozzini, who had settled among the Polish Brethren in 1579, without ever formally joining, and who died in the year before the Catechism was drafted. Despite his lack of any official status in the church Sozzini had been influential in bringing the Polish church round to a Christology which closely resembled what he had learnt from his uncle Lelio Sozzini in exile in Switzerland as a young man.

The Racovian Catechism was published in 1605, and subsequently translated into other languages. Smalcius produced a German version.

The Ecclesia Minor survived in Poland until 1658 when it was outlawed by the Polish Sejm in the Roman Catholic Counter-Reformation. These nontrinitarians, and their Catechism, would later become known as Socinians due to the prominence given to Fausto Sozzini's writings after his death in the series Bibliotheca Fratrum Polonorum published in Amsterdam 1665 and widely circulated in England and elsewhere.

In August 1650 John Milton licensed the Racovian catechism for publication by William Dugard. On April 2, 1652, The English Parliament voted to seize and burn all copies circulating.

A revised Latin edition of the Racovian catechism appeared in 1680 in Amsterdam, revised by Sozzini's grandson Andrzej Wiszowaty Sr. and great-grandson Benedykt Wiszowaty. This was the base of Thomas Rees' 1818 English translation.

== Contents (1818) ==
Preface

- Section One - Of the Holy Scriptures

Chapter 1: Of the Authenticity of the Holy Scriptures
Chapter 2: Of the Sufficiency of the Holy Scriptures
Chapter 3: Of the Perspicuity of the Holy Scriptures

- Section Two - Concerning the way of Salvation

Chapter 1: The Reasons of the Revelation of the Way of Salvation
Chapter 2: Concerning those Things which constitute the Way of Salvation

- Section Three - Of the knowledge of God

Chapter 1: Of the Nature of God
Chapter 2: Of the Will of God

- Section Four - Of the Knowledge of Christ

Chapter 1: Of the Person of Christ

- Section Five - Of the Prophetic Office of Christ

Chapter 1: Of the Precepts of Christ which he added to the Law
Chapter 2: Of the Precepts of Christ delivered by him separately
Chapter 3: Of the Baptism of Water
Chapter 4: Of the Breaking of the Holy Bread
Chapter 5: Of the Promise of Eternal Life
Chapter 6: Of the Promise of the Holy Spirit
Chapter 7: Of the Confirmation of the Divine Will
Chapter 8: Of the Death of Christ
Chapter 9: Of Faith
Chapter 10: Of Free Will
Chapter 11: Of Justification

- Section Six - Of the Priestly Office of Christ
- Section Seven - Of the Kingly Office of Christ
- Section Eight - Of the Church of Christ

Chapter 1: Of the Visible Church
Chapter 2: Of the Government of the Church of Christ
Chapter 3: Of the Discipline of the Church of Christ
Chapter 4: Of the Invisible Church

== Distinctive doctrines ==
=== Christology ===
The most distinctive element in Socinian, as opposed to Arian, Christology is the rejection of the personal pre-existence of Christ. The theme of Christ's preexistence occurs repeatedly in the Racovian Catechism, with detailed discussion of disputed verses, such as:

- "In the Beginning was the Word" John 1:1 – The explanation is given, taken from Lelio Sozzini's Brief explanation of John Chapter 1 1561 (and developed in Fausto Sozzini's later work of the same name), that the Beginning refers to the Beginning of the Gospel, not the old creation.
- "Before Abraham was I am" John 8:58 – is treated that the ego eimi refers to "I am" before "Abraham becomes" (future) many nations in the work of Christ.
- "[I] came down from heaven" John 6:38 – is related to being "born of the Virgin"
- That Christ was literally dead in the grave for three days – as a proof of Christian mortalism, resurrection and the humanity of Christ.

Most early Socinians accepted the infallibility of the New Testament and so accepted the account of the literal virgin birth of Jesus, but many later Socinians (i.e., Unitarians) did not.

=== The personal devil ===
The Racovian Catechism makes muted reference to the devil in seven places which prompts the 1818 translator Thomas Rees to footnote references to the works of Hugh Farmer (1761) and John Simpson (1804). Yet these references are in keeping with the somewhat subdued handling of the devil in the Biblioteca Fratrum Polonorum. The Collegia Vicentina at Vicenza (1546) had questioned not only the existence of the devil but even of angels.

== Translations ==
- 1608 German by Valentinus Smalcius
- 1650 In August, William Dugard licensed by John Milton, then a censor, to print the Catechism in London
- 1652 English version printed Broer Jansz, Amsterdam, attributed to John Biddle whose own "Twofold Catechism" was first published in 1654
- 1652 In April, Parliament orders all copies in England to be gathered and burned: it may have been this action that prompted Biddle to have another edition printed in Amsterdam
- 1659 Dutch version (paraphrase) Collegiants
- 1666 Dutch version (official)
- 1680 revised Latin Edition by Andrzej Wiszowaty and Benedykt Wiszowaty, Amsterdam.
- 1818 English: The Racovian Catechism of 1605 A Sketch of the History of Unitarianism in Poland and the adjacent countries. Thomas Rees, F.S.A. London: Printed for Longman
- 2026 English: Racovian Catechism, translated from the Latin by Marcin Poholski

== See also ==
- Hungarian Unitarian Catechism
