= Andrzej Wiszowaty =

Socinian theologian (1608–1678)

Andrzej Wiszowaty, Sr. (Latin: Andreas Wissowatius) (Filipów, 1608 - 1678, Amsterdam) was a Socinian theologian who worked with Joachim Stegmann (1595–1633) on the Racovian Catechism (1605), and taught in Raków at the Polish Brethren's Racovian Academy.

After the Polish Brethren's 1639 expulsion from the Polish-Lithuanian Commonwealoth, Andrzej Wiszowaty, Sr., was the main mover in the printing of the Bibliotheca fratrum Polonorum, which was to influence Voltaire and John Locke. He supervised the printing in Amsterdam, by Frans Kuyper, of the works of Johann Crell (1665), and in 1668 – back-numbered as "Volume 1" – the works of his grandfather, Fausto Sozzini.

He was working on a revised edition of the Racovian Catechism when he died in 1678. It was published in Amsterdam in 1680 and became the basis for Thomas Rees' 1818 English translation. His own major work, Religio rationalis (Rational Religion) was published by his son, Benedykt Wiszowaty.

== Family ==
Coat of Arms: Pierzchała/Roch

Polish nobleman. Coat-of-arms: Pierzchała/Roch

great-grandfather Krzysztof Morsztyn Sr. (1522-1600) founder of Filipow.
grandparents Fausto Sozzini and Elisabeth Morsztyn (sister of Krzysztof Morsztyn Jr. c.1580-d.1642)
parents - Stanisław Wiszowaty and Agnieszka Sozzini.

married - Aleksandra z Rupniowskich

son - Benedykt Wiszowaty (c.1650-c.1704)
grandson - Andrzej Wiszowaty Jr., born in exile in Prussia, from 1724 teacher at the Unitarian Academy in Cluj-Napoca, Transylvania.

== Works ==
62 works including:

- A dissertation against the Trinity, De sancta trinitate objectiones quaedam (1665), that was refuted by Leibniz in his Defensio Trinitatis contra Wissowatium (1669).
- Narratio compendiosa quomodo in Polonia a Trinitariis Reformatis separati sint Christiani Unitarii (1678).
- Religio rationalis, seu de Rationis judicio in controversiis, etiam theologicis ac religiosis (posthumously 1685).

Publisher in Amsterdam with Kuyper of the Bibliotheca Fratrum Polonorum quos Unitarios vocant, instructua operibus omnibus Fausti Socini (1665, 1668).

- Hymns and Psalms in Polish
