= Krzysztof Morsztyn Jr. =

Polish nobleman and educator

Leliwa coat of arms

Krzysztof Morsztyn Jr. (c. 1580 – 1642) of the Leliwa coat of arms, was a Polish nobleman, educator, starosta of Filipow, and starosta of Przewałka.

He was the son of Krzysztof Morsztyn Sr. (1522–1600), the founder of the Polish Brethren community in Filipow in 1585, and brother in law of Fausto Sozzini who had married his sister Elżbieta in 1586. His son was Seweryn Morsztyn (before 1604 – before 1668).
