= Étienne de Courcelles =

Étienne de Courcelles (Latin: Stephanus Curcellaeus; Geneva 2 May 1586 – Amsterdam 20 May 1659) was an Arminian Greek scholar and translator.

He studied from 1609 in Zurich, and after that he was French Protestant minister of Amiens, translator of Grotius, and successor of Simon Episcopius at the Remonstrant seminary in Amsterdam. He is credited with introducing Cartesianism into Dutch Arminian circles. Courcelles was a personal friend of Descartes, and translated the Discours de la méthode and Les Météores into Latin, but he was only superficially influenced by Descartes.

== Works ==
- Novum Testamentum (Greek New Testament) 1658, 909 pages.
- Specimina philosophiae (1644) — Latin translations of Descartes's Discours de la méthode and Les Météores

The Arminians strove whenever they could to reconcile the philosophical systems of their day. This resulted in an eclectic philosophy consisting mainly of elements of moderate Cartesianism and Lockean empiricism.
