= Johannes Crellius =

Polish-German theologian (1590–1633)

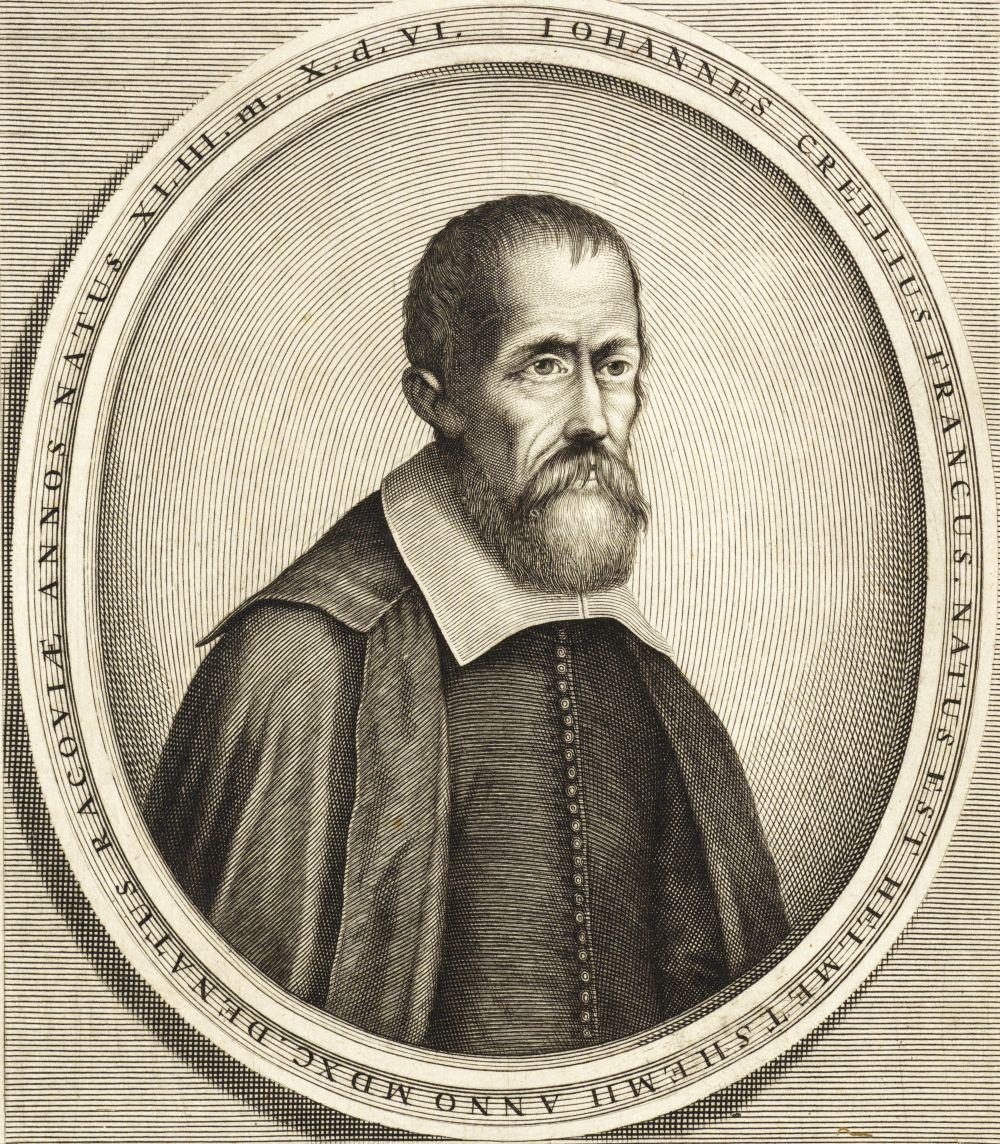
Johannes Crellius

Johannes Crellius (Polish: Jan Crell, English: John Crell; 26 July 1590 in Hellmitzheim – 11 June 1633 in Raków) was a Polish and German theologian.

== Life ==
Johann Crell's father, Johann Crell Sr., was pastor of the church at Hellmitzheim, (today part of Iphofen in Kitzingen District), in Franken, northern Bavaria. His son Krzysztof Crell-Spinowski (1622–1680), and his grandsons Christopher Crell Jr., MD, of London (b. 1658), Samuel Crellius (1660–1747) and Paweł Crell-Spinowski (b. 1677), as well as his great-grandsons in Georgia, United States, were all proponents of Socinian views.

Crellius moved to Poland at the age of 22, and quickly became known as one of the chief theologians of the Socinians, also known as Polish Brethren. From 1613 he worked at the Racovian Academy at Raków, of which he was the rector from 1616 to 1621. In 1630 he worked with Joachim Stegmann Sr. in the production of a German version of the Racovian New Testament.

== Influence ==
Several of Crell's works were printed first by Rodecki and Sternacki at the printery of the Racovian Academy 1602–1638. These and others then appeared as Vol.III–V of Frans Kuyper's Bibliotheca Fratrum Polonorum quos Unitarios vocant ("Library of the Polish Brethren called Unitarians") Amsterdam 1668 Crell also featured in Christopher Sand's bibliography and biographical collection Bibliotheca antitrinitariorum (1684). These works were widely distributed being owned by Voltaire, John Locke and other Enlightenment thinkers.

Two of Crell's works were translated into English. First, A Learned and Exceeding Well-Compiled Vindication of Liberty of Religion (London: 1646). Second, The Two Books ... Touching on God the Father: Wherein Many Things Also Concerning the Nature of the Son of God, and the Holy Spirit are Discoursed of. The first edition was published in Konigsburg (1665). A second edition was published in London (1691). It was re-titled The Unity of God Answered and Defended, but with the exception of the title page it was identical to the first edition.

Knowledge of Crell's works passed out of the later generations of English Unitarians. However Thomas Belsham is one of the Unitarian authors who had access to Crell in the Latin and he repeatedly cites Crell in his The Epistles of Paul the Apostle Translated, with an Exposition, and Notes (1822).

== Works ==
- 1623 Ad librum Hugonis Grotii quem de satisfactione Christi... – on Grotius
- 1630 De Deo et eius attributis... – on God and his attributes
- 1631 De uno Deo Patre libri duo – translated into English as The Two Books of John Crellius Francus on One God the Father
- 1635 Prima ethices elementa – on the elements of ethics
- 1637 C. Vindiciae pro religionis liberate – on the freedom of conscience
- 1665 His works were published first (before Vol.I–II) as part of the series Bibliotheca Fratrum Polonorum by Frans Kuyper in Amsterdam.

Translations

- A learned and exceeding well-compiled vindication of liberty of religion by Johann Crell
- De la tolérance dans la religion ou de la liberté de conscience. Par Crellius. L'intolérance convaincue de crime et de folie. Ouvrage traduit de l'anglois. (French Edition)

Misattributed

- Hermann Cingallus Scriptura S. Trinitatis Revelatrix (Gouda 1678) attributed by John Locke to Crell, but by Robert Wallace (Unitarian) to Christopher Sandius
- Icander Das fast auf dem höchsten Gipfel der Vollkommenheit prangende Dresden, 1726 – a work by a Swedish architect on baroque Dresden with no connection to Socinianism, (cataloguing error by web-based reprint houses)
