= Andrzej Wiszowaty Jr. =

Andrzej Wiszowaty Jr. (1685 – 1735) was a grandson of Andrzej Wiszowaty Sr. He taught at the Unitarian Gymnasium in Kolozsvár (today Cluj) from 1726 or before.

It appears that Andrzej Jr. was born while his father Benedykt Wiszowaty was a Unitarian minister in Kosinowo, in the Duchy of Prussia. His mother was Eufronzyna Sierakowska widowed of Jan Lubieniecki (1653-1683)

From 1712 to 1722 he studied in the Netherlands. In September 1722 he presided for the first time over Communion of the Polish Unitarian congregation in Kolozsvár, of which he was pastor. His later years in Transylvania coincide with the revival in the fortunes of the Unitarian church there led by bishop Mihály Lombard de Szentábrahám.

He died after he presided over church discipline on September 18, 1735 and before December 1735 when the Polish Unitarian congregation did not sit for its discipline.
