= Christopher Sandius =

Christopher Sandius Jr. (Königsberg, October 12, 1644 – Amsterdam, November 30, 1680) was an Arian writer and publisher of Socinian works without himself being a Socinian.

His name was Latinized as Christophorus Sandius, though his German name appears to have been Christoph Sand, and he was known as Christof Van den Sand during his later years in the Netherlands.

Following research by Lech Szczucki it appears that Sandius Jr. was well educated by his rigorous father, Christopher Sandius Sr., (d.1686) a government official in Königsberg, who himself was later removed from his office for anti-Trinitarian sympathies. Sandius Jr. moved to Amsterdam and earned his living as an editor, translator and publisher, he became well-recognized among European intellectuals. Sandius Jr. promoted the view that Arianism was the high point of the theology of the Early Church. He remained on good terms with exiled Polish Socinians Andrzej Wiszowaty and Stanislaw Lubieniecki, while engaging in friendly polemics with them on the problem of the pre-existence of Christ which they denied, but Sandius, as an Arian, accepted.

Sandius Jr. also enjoyed close relationship with Benedictus Spinoza especially at the end of his life, when he became known as one of philosopher's most faithful followers. Between 1676 and 1680 he defended the anonymous author of the Tractatus Theologico-Politicus in correspondence with the Catholic theologian Pierre Daniel Huet.

== Works ==
Possible involvement with Frans Kuyper's Bibliotheca Fratrum Polonorum quos Unitarios vocant. 1668 ("post A.D. 1656" incorrect)

- 1669 Nucleus Historiae Ecclesiasticae, in 2 vols. 8vo, reprinted at Cologne, in 1676: and in London in 1681.
- 1669 Interpretationes paradoxae IV. Evangeliorum (1670 ed.).
- 1669 Centuria Epigrammatum.
- 1671 Tractatus de Origine Animae.
- 1677 Notae et Observationes in G. J. Vossium de Historicis Latinis.
- 1678 Confessio Fidei de Deo Patre, Filio, et Spiritu Sancto, secundum Scripturam,
- Hermann Cingallus (pseud.) Scriptura sacrae trinitatis revelatrix

Posthumous. edited by Benedykt Wiszowaty, grandson of Fausto Sozzini:

- “Bibliotheca Anti-trinitariorum: sive catalogus scriptorum et succinta narratio” posthumously Freistadt, Austria 1684, 12mo, containing an account of the lives and writings of Socinian authors such as Georg Schomann, and some tracts giving many particulars of the history of the Polish Socinians.
