= Polish Brethren =

Members of the Minor Reformed Church of Poland

The Polish Brethren (Polish: Bracia Polscy) were members of the Minor Reformed Church of Poland, a nontrinitarian Protestant church that existed in Poland from 1565 to 1658. By those on the outside, they were called "Arians" or "Socinians" (Polish: arianie, socynianie), but themselves preferred simply to be called "Brethren" or "Christians" (and, after their expulsion from Poland, "Unitarians").

== History ==
The Ecclesia Minor or Minor Reformed Church of Poland, better known today as the Polish Brethren, was started on January 22, 1556, when Piotr of Goniądz (Peter Gonesius), a Polish student, spoke out against the doctrine of the Trinity during the general synod of the Reformed (Calvinist) churches of Poland held in the village of Secemin.

=== 1565: Split with the Calvinists ===
Religions in Polish–Lithuanian Commonwealth in 1573 (Catholics in yellow, Calvinists in purple, Lutherans in gray, Orthodox in green)

A theological debate called by the Polish king Sigismund II Augustus himself in 1565 did not succeed in bringing both Protestant factions together again. Finally, the faction that had supported Piotr of Goniądz's arguments broke all ties with the Calvinists and organised its own synod in the town of Brzeziny on June 10, 1565.

In the 1570s a split was developing between the pacifist and Arian group, led by Marcin Czechowic and Grzegorz Paweł z Brzezin, and the non-pacifist and Ebionite group, led by the Belarusian Symon Budny. In 1579, the Italian exile Fausto Sozzini arrived in Poland and applied for admission to the Ecclesia Minor, which was refused because of his rather unusual personal objection to water baptism, but they saw in the Italian an able advocate and Sozzini's capable answering of Budny, followed by his marriage to the daughter of Krzysztof Morsztyn Sr. in 1586 cemented his place among the Polish Brethren. The calling of the group "Socinian" in England is more a result of the place given to Sozzini's writings in the publishing of his grandson Andrzej Wiszowaty Sr. in Amsterdam a century later than any role of active leadership in Sozzini's life, especially given that without submitting to baptism, he could never formally join the church that later bore his name abroad.

=== 1602–1638: Racovian Academy ===
Their biggest cultural centres were Pińczów and Raków, site of the main Arian printing press and the university Racovian Academy (Gymnasium Bonarum Artium) founded in 1602 and closed in 1638, which trained over 1000 students.

=== 1658: Expulsion ===
The Brethren never participated in the Sandomierz Agreement of 1570 between different Polish Protestants. The Minor Church in Poland was dissolved on July 20, 1658, when the Sejm expelled the Socinians from Poland after a series of 17th-century wars known as the Deluge in which Protestant Sweden invaded Poland since the Brethren (like almost all other non-Catholic Christians) were commonly seen as Swedish collaborators.

The Brethren were exiled in three directions and found asylum in the following regions:

- Duchy of Prussia, where Krzysztof Crell-Spinowski and his sons founded new congregations.
- Netherlands, where Andrzej Wiszowaty Sr. published the Bibliotheca Fratrum Polonorum quos Unitarios vocant (1668) and Christopher Sand published the Bibliotheca antitrinitariorum (1684).
- Transylvania, where the Unitarian Church of Transylvania enjoyed freedom. This was the destination of Andrzej Wiszowaty Jr. who became a teacher at the Unitarian College in Kolozsvár (today Cluj, Romania).

== Beliefs ==
=== Theology ===
Originally, the Minor Church followed a non-trinitarian doctrine, inspired by the writings of Michael Servetus. Later on, Socinianism, named for the Italian theologian Fausto Sozzini, became its main theological approach. They were against capital punishment and did not believe in the traditional Christian doctrines of Hell or the Trinity.

=== Church and state ===
They advocated the separation of church and state and taught the equality and brotherhood of all people. They opposed social privileges based on religious affiliation, and their adherents refused military service (they were known for carrying wooden swords, instead of the real almost obligatory szablas), and they declined to serve in political office.

== Influence ==
Although never numerous, they had a significant impact on political thought in Poland. After being expelled from Poland, they emigrated to England, East Prussia and the Netherlands, where their works were widely published and influenced much of the thinking of later philosophers such as John Locke and Pierre Bayle.

Their main ideologues were Piotr z Goniądza ("Gonesius"), Grzegorz Paweł z Brzezin, Marcin Czechowic, although Johannes Crellius (from Germany), and Johann Ludwig von Wolzogen (who came to Poland from Austria) were far better known outside Poland. Among the best known adherents of this fellowship are Mikołaj Sienicki, Jan Niemojewski, and writers and poets Zbigniew Morsztyn, Olbrycht Karmanowski and Wacław Potocki.

This expulsion is sometimes taken as the beginning of decline of famous Polish religious freedom, although the decline started earlier and ended later: the last non-Catholic deputy was removed from parliament in the beginning of the 18th century. Most of Polish Brethren moved to the Netherlands, where they greatly influenced European opinion, becoming precursors to Enlightenment.

=== Influence in Britain ===
John Locke was preceded by a few decades by Samuel Przypkowski on tolerance and by Andrzej Wiszowaty on 'rational religion'. Isaac Newton had met Samuel Crell, son of Johannes Crellius, of the Spinowski family. Newton was well informed about the developments in Poland and collected many books from the Racovian Academy.

The Englishman John Biddle had translated two works by Przypkowski, as well as the Racovian Catechism and a work by Joachim Stegmann, a "Polish Brother" from Germany. Biddle's followers had very close relations with the Polish Socinian family of Crellius (aka Spinowski).

=== Influence in the United States ===
Subsequently, the Unitarian strain of Christianity was continued by, most notably, Joseph Priestley, who had emigrated to the United States and was a friend of both James Madison and Thomas Jefferson, the latter of whom sometimes attended services at Priestley's congregation in Philadelphia. Notably, Priestley was very well informed on the earlier developments in Poland, especially by his mentions of Socinus and Szymon Budny (translator of Bible, author of many pamphlets against the Trinity).

=== In the modern era ===
During the Second Polish Republic, the Lutheran priest Karol Grycz-Śmiałowski recreated what he considered was a revival of the Church of Polish Brethren in Kraków in 1937. During the People's Republic of Poland, it was registered in 1967 as the Unity of Polish Brethren (Jednota Braci Polskich).

Modern groups that look to the Polish Brethren include the Christadelphians and Church of God General Conference. Although Christadelphians had since their origins in the 1840s always looked for historical precedents, the group was unaware of closer precedents in Socinianism. That changed with a series of articles in the community magazine during the early 1970s that was subsequently published. The Polish arm of the Christadelphians use the name Bracia w Chrystusie in a conscious echo of Socinian precedents. The Atlanta Bible College of the Church of God General Conference also publishes a Journal continuing research into the Polish Brethren and related groups.

== See also ==
- Unitarianism
- History of philosophy in Poland
- Polish Reformed Church
