= Bibliotheca antitrinitariorum =

Work by Christopher Sandius

The Bibliotheca antitrinitariorum, or Antitrinitarian Library, first published in 1684, is a posthumously published work of Christopher Sandius (English: Christopher Sand), an exiled Prussian Antitrinitarian in Amsterdam, who chronologically lists all the Arian and Socinian or Antitrinitarian authors from the Reformation to 1684, with a brief account of their lives, and a catalogue of their works. Rather than being a Library, as Frans Kuyper's publication (below), it is a bibliography.

== Related publications ==
The Bibliotheca Fratrum Polonorum quos Unitarios vocant or Library of the Polish Brethren called Unitarians Volumes 1-8 Frans Kuyper 1665,1668, 1692.
