= Socinianism =

Nontrinitarian Christian doctrine taught by Lelio and Fausto Sozzini

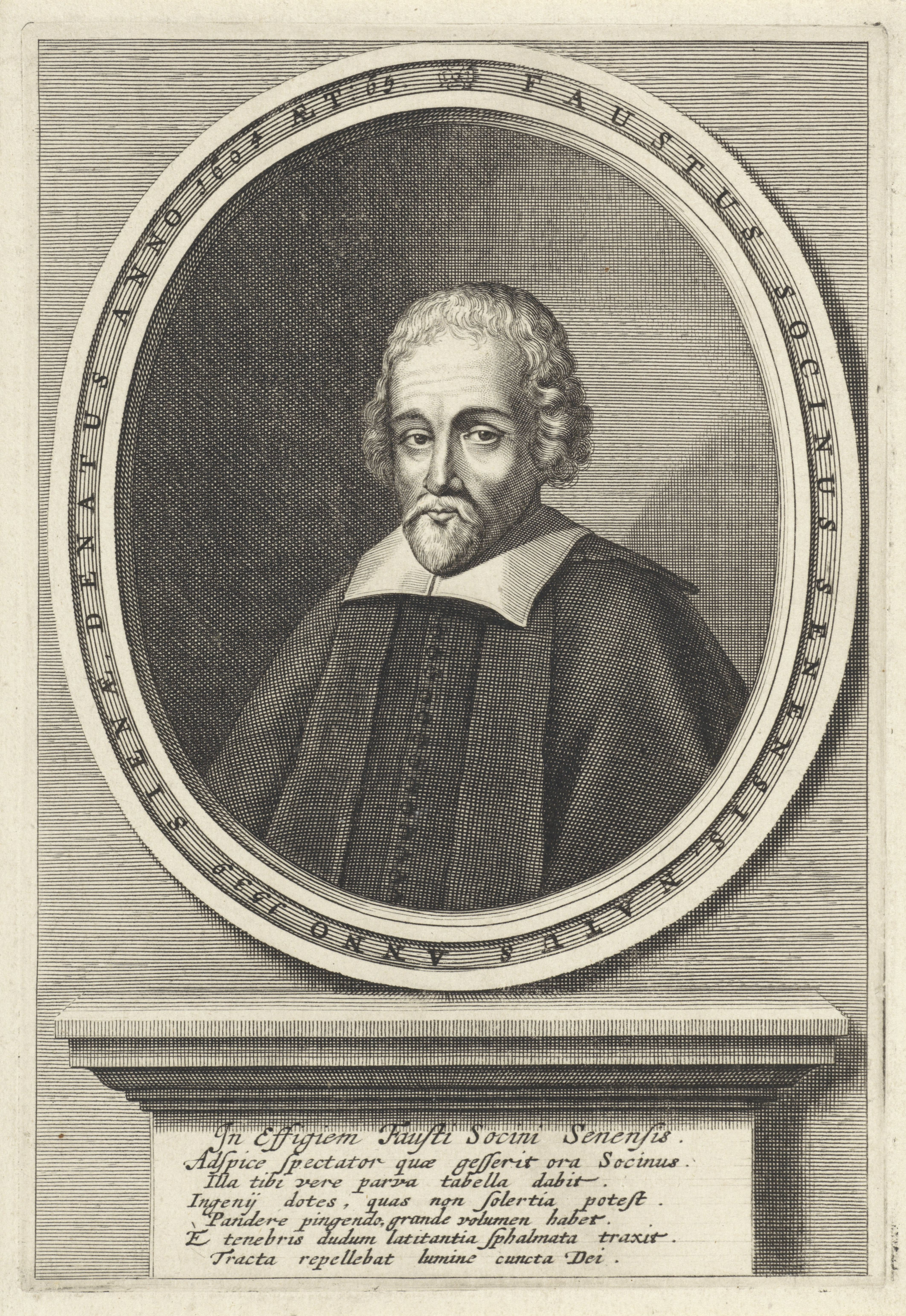
Fausto Sozzini (1539–1604), the theologian namesake of Socinianism

Socinianism (/soʊˈsɪniənɪzəm, səˈ-/ soh-SIN-ee-ə-niz-əm, sə-) is a Nontrinitarian Christian belief system developed and co-founded during the Protestant Reformation by the Italian Renaissance humanists and theologians Lelio Sozzini and Fausto Sozzini, uncle and nephew, respectively.

It was developed among the Polish Brethren in the Polish Reformed Church between the 16th and 17th centuries, and embraced by the Unitarian Church of Transylvania during the same period. Socinianism is most famous for its unitarian belief but contains a number of other distinctive theological doctrines, such as the denial of divine foreknowledge regarding the actions of free agents and rejection of the pre-existence of Christ.

== Origins ==
The beliefs of Socinianism date from the wing of the Protestant Reformation known as the Radical Reformation and have their root in the Italian Anabaptist movement of the 1540s, such as the anti-trinitarian Council of Venice in 1550. Lelio Sozzini was the first of the Italian anti-trinitarians to go beyond Arian beliefs in print and deny the pre-existence of Christ in his Brevis explicatio in primum Johannis caput – a commentary on the meaning of the Logos in John 1:1–15 (1562). Lelio Sozzini considered that the "beginning" of John 1:1 was the same as 1 John 1:1 and referred to the new creation, not the Genesis creation. His nephew Fausto Sozzini published his own longer Brevis explicatio later, developing his uncle's arguments. Many years after the death of his uncle in Switzerland, Fausto Sozzini was consulted by the Unitarian Church in Transylvania, attempting to mediate in the dispute between Giorgio Biandrata and Ferenc Dávid.

He moved to Poland, where he married the daughter of a leading member of the Polish Brethren, the anti-trinitarian minority, or ecclesia minor. In 1565, it had split from the Calvinist Reformed Church in Poland. Sozzini never joined the ecclesia minor, but he was influential in reconciling several controversies among the Brethren: on conscientious objection, on prayer to Christ, and on the virgin birth. Fausto persuaded many in the Polish Brethren who were formerly Arian, such as Marcin Czechowic, to adopt his uncle Lelio's views.

Fausto Sozzini furthered his influence through his Racovian Catechism, published posthumously, which set out his uncle Lelio's views on Christology and replaced earlier catechisms of the Ecclesia Minor. His influence continued after his death through the writings of his students published in Polish and Latin from the press of the Racovian Academy at Raków, Kielce County.

The term Socinian started to be used in the Dutch Republic and the Kingdom of England from the 1610s onward, as the Latin publications were circulated among early Arminians, Remonstrants, Dissenters, and early English Unitarians. In the late 1660s, Fausto Sozzini's grandson Andreas Wiszowaty and great-grandson Benedykt Wiszowaty published the nine-volume Biblioteca Fratrum Polonorum quos Unitarios vocant (1668) in Amsterdam, along with the works of F. Sozzini, the Austrian Johann Ludwig von Wolzogen, and the Poles Johannes Crellius, Jonasz Szlichtyng, and Samuel Przypkowski. These books circulated among English and French thinkers, including Isaac Newton, John Locke, Voltaire, and Pierre Bayle.

In Great Britain and North America, Socinianism later became a catch-all term for any kind of dissenting belief. Sources in the 18th and 19th centuries frequently attributed the term Socinian anachronistically, using it to refer to ideas that embraced a much wider range than the narrowly defined position of the Racovian catechisms and library.

== Beliefs ==
Socinian theology, as summarised in the Racovian Catechism, rejected the views of orthodox Christian theology on God's knowledge, on the doctrine of the Trinity and the divinity of Christ, and on soteriology.

=== Christology ===
The Racovian publications, like the Sozzinis, rejected the pre-existence of Christ and held that Jesus did not exist until he was conceived as a human being. This view had been put forward before by the 4th-century bishop Photinus, but it conflicts with the mainline Protestant, Eastern Orthodox, and Catholic views, which hold that the Logos referred to in the Gospel of John was Jesus.

=== Human nature ===
The Socinians held that humans were created mortal in the beginning and would have died naturally whether Adam and Eve had eaten from the tree or not. They also rejected the doctrine of original sin.

=== Atonement ===
Socinianism also rejected the propitiatory view of atonement.

=== Predestination and omniscience ===
The Socinians believed that God's omniscience was limited to what was a necessary truth in the future (what would definitely happen) and did not apply to what was a contingent truth (what might happen). They believed that, if God knew every possible future, human free will was impossible and as such rejected the "hard" view of omniscience. Modern process theology and open theism advance a similar viewpoint.

== Skepticism ==
Later writers such as Archibald Alexander Hodge (1823–1886) asserted that Socinian theology was rooted in skepticism. However, the original Polish Socinians were believers in miracles and the virgin birth, although there were a few radicals, such as Symon Budny and Jacobus Palaeologus, who denied these.

== Conscientious objection ==
Although not directly a doctrinal belief, the principle of conscientious objection and the obedient relation of the believer to the state became a distinct position of Socinianism as it was formalized in the Racovian publications. Before F. Sozzini's arrival in Poland, there had been a wide range of positions from the total otherworldliness, common property, and withdrawal from the state of Marcin Czechowic of Lublin through to the advocacy of military service by Symon Budny. The next generation of Polish Brethren stabilized between these two positions, carrying wooden swords to follow the letter of the law and allowing senior Socinians such as Hieronim Moskorzowski to vote in the Sejm.

== Offshoots ==
The direct doctrinal descendants of the original Socinians are the Unitarian Christians of Transylvania and England. Although the Polish Brethren never adopted the name "Unitarian" while in Poland, when they were disbanded in 1658, those who fled to Holland eventually embraced the term "Unitarian" (which they got from the Transylvanians), as they preferred not to be called Socinians. The term had been used by the Unitarian Church of Transylvania as early as 1600. Socinian theology continued in Transylvania, where Polish exiles such as Andrzej Wiszowaty Jr. taught in the Unitarian College (1726–1740), as evidenced in the Summa Universae Theologiae Christianae secundum Unitarios of Mihály Lombard de Szentábrahám, recognized as the statement of faith of the Unitarian Church of Transylvania by Emperor Joseph II in 1782. Early English Unitarians such as Henry Hedworth and John Biddle retroactively applied the term "Unitarian" to the Polish Brethren. By 1676 there were at least three Socinian meeting houses in London, even if the Act of Toleration of 1689 saw Socinians and Catholics excluded from official recognition. Socinian ideas continued to have significant influence on Unitarians in England throughout the entire period of their development.

Modern Socinians (in Christological terms) include the small number of "Biblical Unitarian" churches such as the Christadelphians, the Church of God General Conference and the Church of the Blessed Hope, though these churches are not direct descendants of the Polish Brethren.

=== Related beliefs ===
At the time of Fausto Sozzini, Symon Budny held a variant of unitarianism including denial of the virgin birth of Jesus and arguing that Jesus was the son of Joseph, for which he was excluded from the Racovian community.

== See also ==
- Nicodemite
- Nontrinitarianism
- Polish Brethren

== Bibliography ==
- Bowers, J. D. (2007). "English Socinianism: Antecedent to American Unitarianism". Joseph Priestley and English Unitarianism in America. University Park, Pennsylvania: Pennsylvania State University Press. pp. 15–42. ISBN 978-0-271-02950-4. LCCN 2006100016.
- Bowers, J. D. (2007). "The Socinian Migration and the Founding of American Unitarianism". Joseph Priestley and English Unitarianism in America. University Park, Pennsylvania: Pennsylvania State University Press. pp. 43–76. ISBN 978-0-271-02950-4. LCCN 2006100016.
- Mortimer, Sarah (2010). Reason and Religion in the English Revolution: The Challenge of Socinianism. Cambridge Studies in Early Modern British History. Cambridge: Cambridge University Press. ISBN 978-0-521-51704-1. LCCN 2010000384.
- Mulsow, Martin; Rohls, John, eds. (2005). Socinianism And Arminianism: Antitrinitarians, Calvinists, And Cultural Exchange in Seventeenth-Century Europe. Brill's Studies in Intellectual History. Vol. 134. Leiden: Brill Publishers. ISBN 978-90-04-14715-7. ISSN 0920-8607.
