= Critici sacri =

Compilation of Latin biblical commentaries

Critici sacri was a compilation of Latin biblical commentaries published in London from 1660, edited by John Pearson. The publisher was Cornelius Bee. The work appeared in nine volumes, and collected numerous authors, both Protestant and Catholic, of early modern critical work on the Bible. It was intended to complement Brian Walton's Polyglot Bible, and set off a series of subsequent related publications.

The original work, while influential (particularly in making the notes of Grotius widely available), was not a connected Bible commentary, and was found to be long-winded, as well as scanty in other parts. Later publications attempted to address these shortcomings.

== Critici sacri (1660) ==
The original full title was Critici Sacri, sive Doctissimorum Virorum in SS. Biblia Annotationes et Tractatus, and it appeared in nine volumes starting in 1660. The commentary project was launched by Cornelius Bee, with the main editor being John Pearson, supported by Anthony Scattergood and Francis Gouldman, as well as Pearson's brother Richard. Bee was a bookseller in Little Britain, London. He suffered major losses in the 1666 Great Fire.

== Synopsis criticorum (from 1669) ==
The Synopsis criticorum was a work by Matthew Poole, in five volumes, condensing the Critici sacri, and adding further authors. There was a 1684 edition by Johann Leusden; also editions by J. H. Maius (1679), and J. G. Pritz (Pritius) (1712).

There had already been a pioneer complete Bible commentary in English, the Annotations upon all the Books of the Old and New Testament sponsored by the Westminster Assembly. Prompted by William Lloyd, Poole began his compilation in 1666. The prospectus of Poole's work bore the names of eight bishops (headed by Morley and Hacket) and five continental scholars, besides other divines. Simon Patrick, John Tillotson, and Edward Stillingfleet, with four laymen, acted as trustees of the subscription money. A patent for the work was obtained on 14 October 1667.

Poole had assistance from John Lightfoot and Matthew Robinson.

The first volume was ready for the press, when difficulties were raised by Cornelius Bee, who accused Poole of invading his own patent. After pamphlets had been written and legal opinions taken, the matter was referred to Henry Pierrepont, 1st Marquess of Dorchester, and Arthur Annesley, 1st Earl of Anglesey, who decided in Poole's favour; Bee's name appears (1669) among the publishers of the Synopsis. The style was crisp notes, including rabbinical sources and Roman Catholic commentators.

Matthew Poole's Synopsis criticorum is currently being translated by the Matthew Poole Project, and much of the work is available online.

== Critici sacri (from 1698) ==
An expanded edition was produced in Amsterdam from 1698 by a Dutch editorial group, credited as: Hendrick Boom, the widow of Dirk Boom, Johannes Janssonius van Waesberge, Gillis Janssonius van Waesberge, Gerardus Borstius, Abraham van Someren, Joannes Wolters, and Willem van de Water.

The authors included in this collection are selectively listed by Adam Clarke:

- Old Testament commentary (main authors): Sebastian Munster, Paul Fagius, Francis Vatablus, Claudius Badwellus (Claude Badwell), Sebastian Castalio, Isidore Clarius, Lucas Brugensis, Andrew Masius, John Drusius, Sextinus Amama (Sixtinus), Simeon de Muis, Philip Codurcus (Philippe Codurc or Codur), Rodolph Baynus, Francis Forrerius (Francisco Foreiro), Edward Lively, David Hœschelius, Hugo Grotius, Christopher Cartwright, and John Price (Pricaeus).
- Old Testament dissertations: Joseph Scaliger, Lewis Capellus, Martin Helvicus, Alberic Gentilis, Moses bar Cepha, Christopher Helvicus, John Buteo (Johannes Buteo), Matthew Hostus, Francis Moncæus, Peter Pithœus, George Rittershusius, Michael Rothardus, Leo Allatius, Gasper Verrerius, William Schickardus, Augustin Justinianus, Benedict Arias Montanus, Bonaventura Cornelius Bertramus, Peter Cunæus, Caspar Waser, and Edward Brerewood.
- New Testament commentary: Munster, Laurentius Valla, James Revius, Erasmus, Vatablus, Castalio, Clarius, Masius, Nicolas Zegerus (Nikolaas Zegers), Brugensis, Henry Stephens, Drusius, Scaliger, Isaac Casaubon, John Cameron, James Capellus, Lewis Capellus, Otho Gualtperius, Abraham Schultetus, Grotius, and Pricaeus.
- New Testament dissertations: Lewis Capellus, Nicolas Faber, William Klebilius, Marquard Freherus, James Ussher, Hostus, I. A. Vander-Linden, Claudius Salmasius under the name of Johannes Simplicius, James Gothofridus (Jacques Godefroy), Codurcus, Schultetus, William Ader (Guillaume Ader), Drusius, Jac. Lopez Stunica (Diego López de Zúñiga), Erasmus, Angelus Caninius, Pithœus, Nicephorus, Patriarch of Constantinople, Adriani Isagoge with notes by Hœschelius, Bertramus, Antonius Nebrissensis, Nicholas Fuller, Samuel Petit, John Gregory, Cartwright, John Cloppenburg, and Peter Daniel Huet.

== Thesaurus theologico-philologicus ==
Under the full title Thesaurus theologico-philologicus sive sylloge dissertationum elegantiorum ad selectiora et illustriora Veteris et Novi Testamenti two further supplementary volumes were published in Amsterdam in 1701. These were followed up in 1732 by two further volumes of the Thesaurus novus theologico-philologicus; these were edited by Theodor Hase and Conrad Iken.

== Bibliography ==
- Horne, Thomas Hartwell (1836), An introduction to the critical study and knowledge of the Holy Scriptures, Desilver, Thomas
