= Gil Blas =

Picaresque novel by Alain-René Lesage

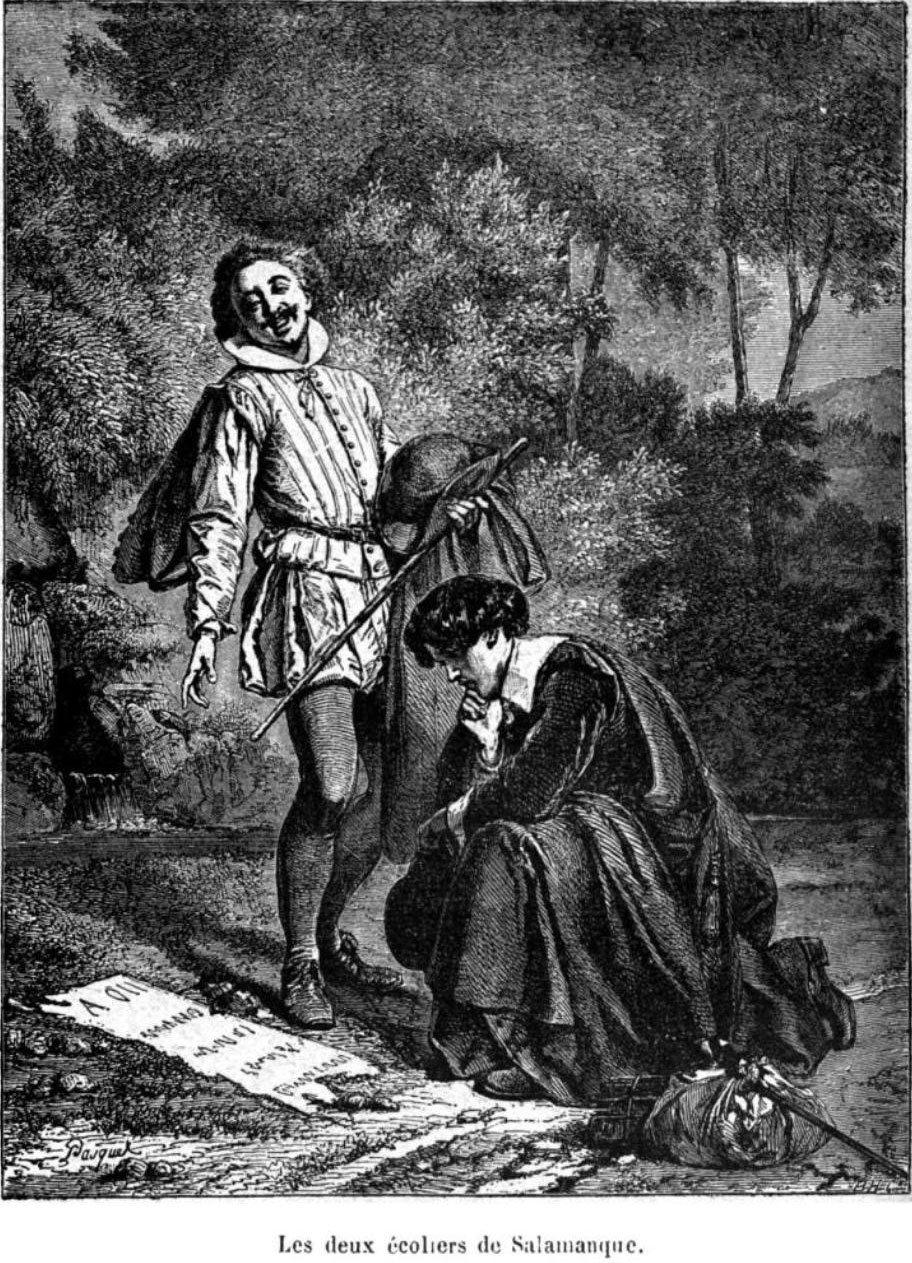
- Author: Alain-René Lesage
- Original title: Histoire de Gil Blas de Santillane
- Language: French
- Genre: Picaresque
- Publisher: Pierre Ribou
- Publication date: 1715–1735
- Publication place: France

Gil Blas (French: L'Histoire de Gil Blas de Santillane [listwaʁ də ʒil blɑ də sɑ̃tijan]) is a picaresque novel by Alain-René Lesage published between 1715 and 1735. It was highly popular, and was translated several times into English, most notably by Tobias Smollett in 1748 as The Adventures of Gil Blas of Santillane.

== Plot summary ==
Gil Blas is born in misery to a stablehand and a chambermaid of Santillana in Cantabria, and is educated by his uncle. He leaves Oviedo at the age of seventeen to attend the University of Salamanca. His bright future is suddenly interrupted when he is forced to help robbers along the route and is faced with jail.

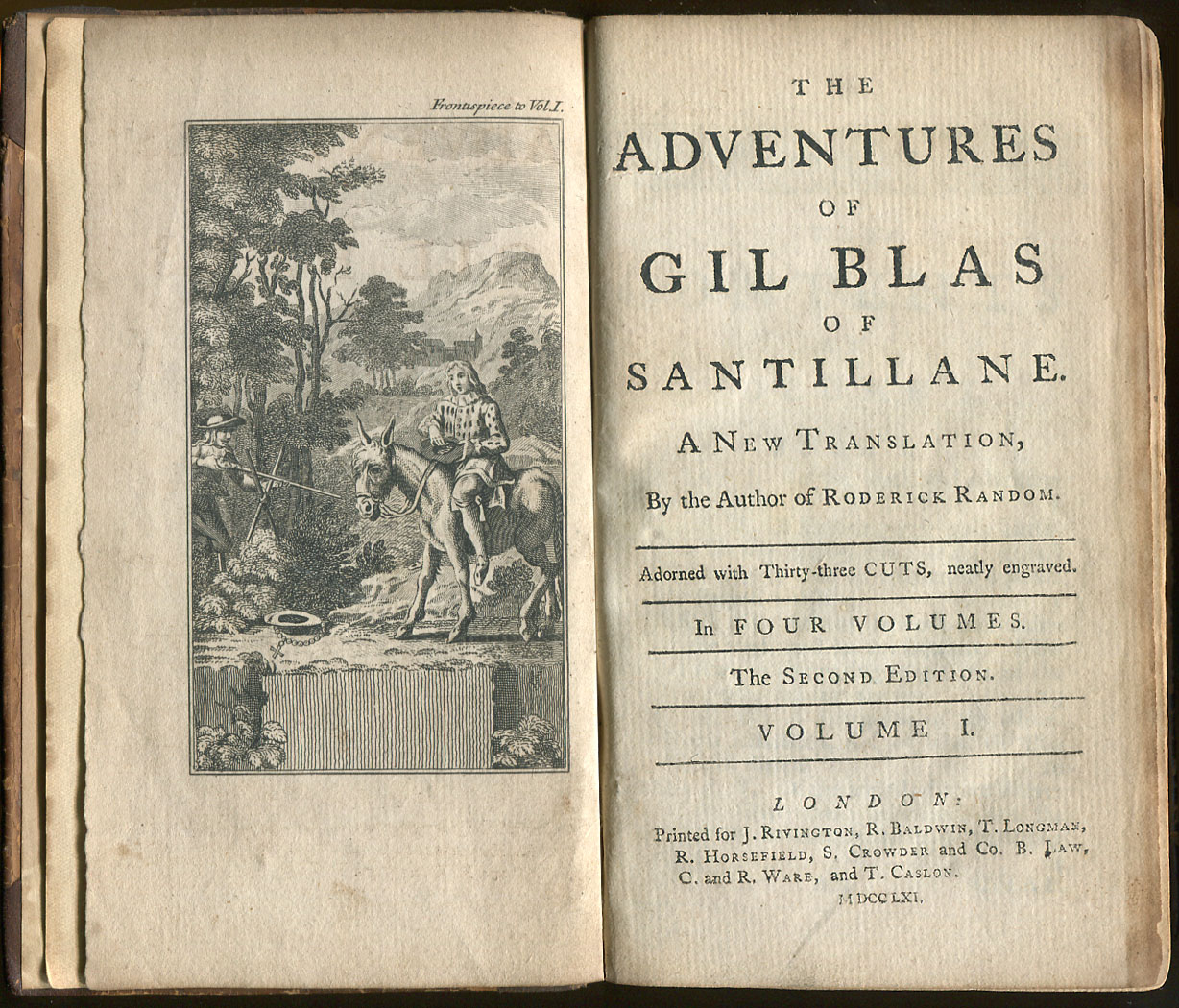
Frontispiece and title page of a 1761 English translation of The Adventures of Gil Blas

He becomes a valet and, over the course of several years, is able to observe many different classes of society, both lay and clerical. Because of his occupation, he meets many disreputable people and is able to adjust to many situations, thanks to his adaptability and quick wit.

He finally finds himself at the royal court as a favourite of the king and secretary to the prime minister. Working his way up through hard work and intelligence, Gil is able to retire to a castle to enjoy a fortune and a hard-earned honest life.

== Literary significance and reception ==
Gil Blas is related to Lesage's play Turcaret (1709). In both works, Lesage uses witty valets in the service of thieving masters, women of questionable morals, cuckolded yet happy husbands, gourmands, ridiculous poets, false savants, and dangerously ignorant doctors to make his point. Each class and each occupation becomes an archetype.

=== References and allusions in other works ===
Jean-Jacques Rousseau mentions reading Gil Blas in his Confessions (Book IV, 1731–1732), saying it came highly recommended by Mademoiselle du Chatelet who "had a taste for that kind of moral observation which leads to the knowledge of mankind". Rousseau commented that "I read this performance with pleasure, but my judgment was not yet ripe enough to relish that sort of reading".

Gil Blas is referred to by Jonathan Swift in his satirical Directions to Servants, dated 1731, with recommendations for the servants of rich masters to take the most advantage and have the least trouble in their daily tasks. In the chapter aimed at the "House Steward and Land Steward", Swift specifically instructs the reader to look up what Gil Blas has to say on the matter, as a more qualified source thus acknowledged.

The 1751 play Gil Blas by the British writer Edward Moore was performed at the Theatre Royal, Drury Lane with David Garrick in the title role.

Vasily Narezhny imitated Lesage in his 1814 novel A Russian Gil Blas (Russian: Российский Жильблаз).

The Adventures of Hajji Baba of Ispahan (1824) by the British diplomat James Morier was modelled on Gil Blas.

Friedrich Korn's novel Der jüdische Gil Blas (The Jewish Gil Blas) was published in 1834.

Gil Blas is alluded to in Leopold von Sacher-Masoch's Venus in Furs. The character Wanda von Dunajew ascribes the cause of her own free thinking to an early introduction to classical works; these include Gil Blas, which she read at the age of ten.

Gil Blas is referred to in Honoré de Balzac's Facino Cane. The protagonist promises to spare the narrator "tales of adventures worthy of Gil Blas".

In his 1835 book A Steam Voyage Down the Danube Michael Joseph Quin says "The favourite book of my youth was Gils Blas" on meeting a group of Wallachian merchants who he suspected would try to take advantage of him.

The Spanish writer Pedro Antonio de Alarcón appropriated the main character for his 1852 novella Death's Friend, which otherwise is a variation of the folk tale "Godfather Death", set in 18th-century Spain.

In Oliver Wendell Holmes's The Autocrat of the Breakfast-Table (1857), the Autocrat begins Section IX with the famous quote from Lesage's Preface: "Aqui esta encerrada el alma del licenciado Pedro Garcia": "Here is enclosed the soul of the lawyer Pedro Garcia". This signals that his own readers, like the two bachelors of Salamanca who discover Garcia's gravestone, will need to "fix on the moral concealed" beneath the surface of his recollections if they are to receive any benefit from them.

In a letter to William Dean Howells dated 5 July 1875, Mark Twain tells of just completing the manuscript for The Adventures of Tom Sawyer (written in the third person) and deciding against taking Tom into adulthood: to do so, he says, "would be fatal ... in any shape but autobiographically – like Gil Blas". Scholar Walter Blair in Mark Twain and Huck Finn (1960) thus concludes that Twain's new novel, The Adventures of Huckleberry Finn, which, picaresque-like, "would run its protagonist 'through life', had to be written in the first person; Gil Blas was the model".

In his plan for the novel The Life of a Great Sinner, Dostoevsky notes that the concision of this work will at times mirror that of Gil Blas. Gil Blas is also mentioned in chapter III of Dostoyevsky's A Gentle Creature, in which the narrator asks, "Why, didn't she tell me that amusing story about Gil Blas and the Archbishop of Granada herself the day before yesterday? We were discussing books. She was telling me about the books she had been reading that winter, and it was then that she told me about the scene from Gil Blas."

In A Rogue's Life by Wilkie Collins the rogue declares, "I am as even-tempered a rogue as you have met with anywhere since the days of Gil Blas."

Edgar Allan Poe considered it among "the finest narratives in the world". Also he mentions the archbishop in Gil Blas in the short story "The Angel of the Odd": the angel makes a low bow and departs, wishing, in the language of the archbishop, beaucoup de bonheur et un peu plus de bon sens (much happiness and a little more common sense).

Italo Calvino's main character in The Baron in the Trees reads the book and lends it to a brigand.

Gil Blas is mentioned in Thomas Flanagan's 1979 novel The Year of the French, in which poet Owen MacCarthy mentions having it with him "on [his] ramblings, years ago". Flanagan uses the book to connect the poor Irish citizens and their French allies in the Irish Rebellion of 1798, illustrating that the Irish may not all be as simple as Arthur Vincent Broome, the loyalist narrator, presumes. This allusion to Gil Blas also connects the somewhat roguish MacCarthy to the picaresque protagonist Gil Blas.

Chapter 7 of David Copperfield, by Charles Dickens, relates the story of Gil Blas to Steerforth and Traddles. Poor Traddles' teeth chatter and are overheard by the brutish head master Creakle who goes on to "handsomely flog" Traddles "for disorderly conduct".

Charles Dickens, in American Notes for General Circulation and Pictures from Italy," invokes "the mysterious master of Gil Blas" in reference to a pig in New York City.

One of Thomas Edison's closest early friends, Milton F. Adams, was referred to as a modern Gil Blas for his life of travel and dissolution as a "tramp operator", roaming from place to place and as far away as Peru as an itinerant telegraph operator.

In The House of the Seven Gables Nathaniel Hawthorne, in his description of Holgrave (chapter XII), says "A romance on the plan of Gil Blas, adapted to American society and manners, would cease to be a romance." His implication is that the normal experiences of a young American, such as Holgrave, are so extraordinary in comparison with those of Gil Blas, that they make the latter's adventures seem ordinary. Hawthorne then writes, "The experience of many individuals among us, who think it hardly worth the telling, would equal the vicissitudes of the Spaniard's earlier life; while their ultimate success ... may be incomparably higher than any that a novelist would imagine for a hero."

According to Vincent Cronin's biography, the first thing that the 15-year-old Napoleon did on arriving in Paris was to buy a copy of Gil Blas.

In Two Years Before the Mast by Richard Henry Dana Jr., the author describes the passengers aboard his ship the Alert, as it sailed along the California coast in 1836 from Monterey to Santa Barbara. The author writes: "Among our passengers was a young man who was the best representation of a decayed gentleman I had ever seen. He reminded me much of some of the characters in Gil Blas." Describing Don Juan Bandiniand, he writes: "He was of the aristocracy of the country, his family being of pure Spanish blood, and once of great importance in Mexico ... Don Juan had with him a retainer, who was as much like many of the characters in Gil Blas as his master. He called himself a private secretary, though there was no writing for him to do, and he lived in the steerage with the carpenter and sailmaker."

In the novel Confessions of Con Cregan, the Irish Gil Blas by Charles Lever, the eponymous hero of the title states he has not only read Gil Blas, but also knows it almost by heart.

Gil Blas was the name of a nationalist Brazilian literary journal in 1920, reflecting the Gallic leanings of Brazil's literary scene in the early 20th century and the resonance of the picaresque character in Brazilian culture.

In the fantasy novel Silverlock by John Myers Myers, the character Lucius Gil Jones is a composite of Lucius in The Golden Ass by Apuleius, Gil Blas, and Tom Jones in The History of Tom Jones, a Foundling by Henry Fielding.

In The Social History of Bourbon (1963), Gerald Carson notes that the education of young men in antebellum Kentucky meant they "read law with the local judge, studied medicine at the Louisville Medical Institute, wrote stilted verses in the neoclassical fashion, read Gil Blas and books on surveying, farming, and distilling".

In his 1954 novel A Fable, William Faulkner has General of Division Gragnon obsessively reading Gil Blas during his house arrest after his front-line division mutinies. A member of his staff had died protecting a car with prominent visitors by forcing them to stop short of where an incoming shell landed. When he was arrested, Gragnon remembered this officer telling him about Gil Blas and located the book among his effects.

In his preface to The Ambassadors, Henry James mentions the narration methods of Gil Blas and David Copperfield as alternatives to the narrative technique he himself used in The Ambassadors.

Washington Irving's A Tour on the Prairies includes a section describing a wanderer on the American prairie frontier, whom he refers to as a "Gil Blas of the frontier".

Thomas Jefferson included Gil Blas in his list of recommendations to Robert Skipwith of books for a general personal library.

According to Schopenhauer, it is one of the few novels showing "what is really going on in the world".

In O homem que sabia javanês, a short story by Lima Barreto, written in 1911 and published by Gazeta da Tarde, an allusion is made between the characters of Castelo and Gil Blas.

In chapter 5 of his Education of a Wandering Man, Louis L'Amour describes his "good fortune" in finding an abandoned copy of Gil Blas in a laundry room. He later reads it by firelight in the camp where he worked skinning dead cattle "not once but twice, on the plains of West Texas."

In the 1892 novel Ask Mama published by Bradbury, Agnew & Co. the mule of Gil Blas is referred to when, referring to his horses, "as a buyer he [Major Yammerton] made them out to be all faults, as a seller when they suddenly seemed to become the paragons of perfection".

== Operatic adaptations ==
An episode from Gil Blas was the basis of two separate French operas in the 1790s, both with the same title: La caverne (1793) by Le Sueur and La caverne by Méhul (1795).

Gil Blas was the title of a five-act farcical opera by John Hamilton Reynolds adapting Lesage's novel, perhaps assisted by Thomas Hood, and first performed on 1 August 1822. It was famously five hours long on its first night at the Royal Strand Theatre on the Strand, and was then cut to three acts and the title changed to The Youthful Days of Gil Blas. According to Reynolds's biographer, Leonidas M. Jones, no text of the play survives.

Théophile Semet composed a comic opera on Gil Blas in five acts (1860). Alphons Czibulka composed Gil Blas von Santillana, with libretto by F. Zell and Moritz West. It was first performed in 1889.

== Film adaptation ==
In 1956 the film The Adventures of Gil Blas was released. A French-Spanish co-production it was directed by René Jolivet and Ricardo Muñoz Suay and starred Georges Marchal as Gil Blas.

== Other adaptations ==
Lionel Stevenson identified Robert Browning as the translator of one English translation of Gil Blas which featured a partial word-by-word interlinear translation.

== Publication history ==
- Histoire de Gil Blas de Santillane, Books 1–6 (1715)
- Histoire de Gil Blas de Santillane, Books 7–9 (1724)
- Histoire de Gil Blas de Santillane, Books 10–12 (1735)
- Histoire de Gil Blas de Santillane, London, M. M. Lackington, Allen & Co 1798, 4 volumes
