= The Thousand-and-Second Tale of Scheherazade =

- Short story by Edgar Allan Poe
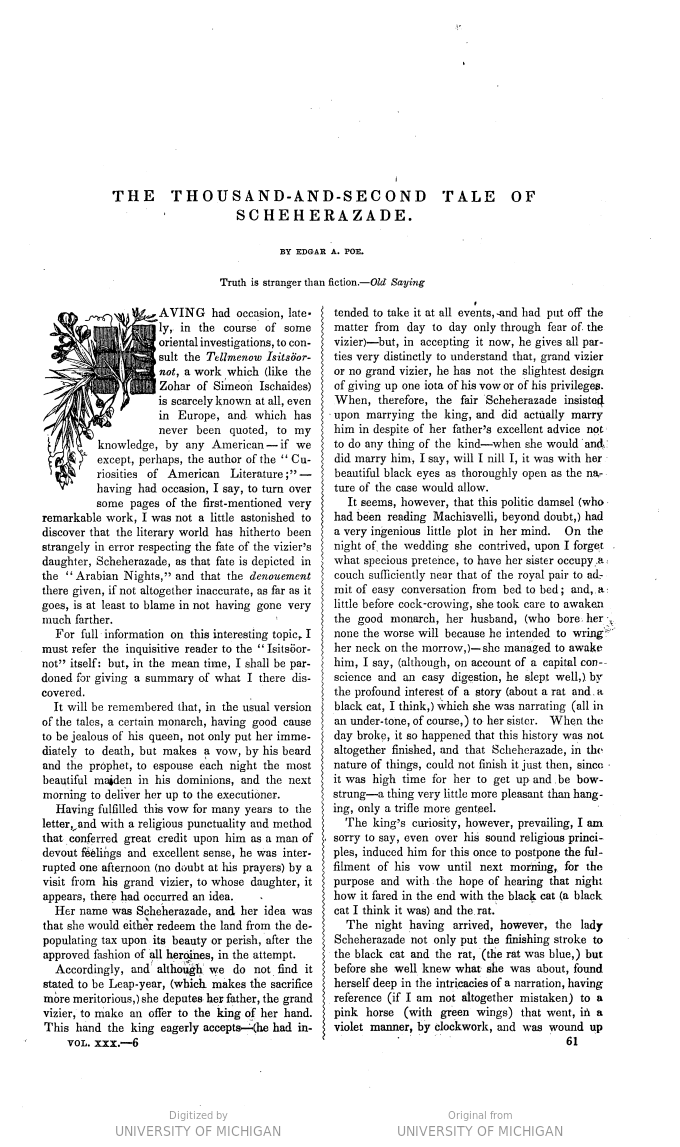
- Country: United States
- Language: English
- Genre: Satirical short story

Publication
- Published in: Godey's Lady's Book
- Publisher: Louis A. Godey
- Media type: Print (Periodical)
- Publication date: February 1845

"The Thousand-and-Second Tale of Scheherazade" is a short-story by American author Edgar Allan Poe (1809–1849). It was published in the February 1845 issue of Godey's Lady's Book and was intended as a partly humorous sequel to the celebrated collection of Middle Eastern tales One Thousand and One Nights.

== Plot summary ==
The tale depicts the eighth and final voyage of Sinbad the Sailor, along with the various mysteries Sinbad and his crew encounter; the anomalies are then described as footnotes to the story. While the King is uncertain — except in the case of "the earth being upheld by a cow of a blue color, having horns four hundred in number" — that these mysteries are real, they are actual modern events that occurred in various places during, or before, Poe's lifetime. The story ends with the king in such disgust at the outlandish tales Scheherazade has just woven, that he has her executed the next day.

Poe biographer Kenneth Silverman notes that the story mocks the idea that technological advancements have positive impact on human culture.

== Wonders and anomalies described ==
- Coralite ("an island, many hundreds of miles in circumference ... built in the middle of the sea by a colony of little things like caterpillars")
- Maelzel's Chess Player ("a man out of brass and wood, and leather ... with such ingenuity that he would have beaten at chess, all the race of mankind")
- Antlion pits ("myriads of monstrous animals with horns resembling scythes upon their heads ... dig for themselves vast caverns in the soil, of a funnel shape")
- Mammoth Cave ("a cave that ran to the distance of thirty or forty miles within the bowels of the earth ... far more spacious and more magnificent palaces ... there flowed immense rivers as black as ebony, and swarming with fish that had no eyes")
- Babbage's calculating machine ("constructed ... a creature ... so great were its reasoning powers that, in a second, it performed calculations of ... the united labor of fifty thousand fleshy men for a year")
- Destructive Wave interference ("Another of these magicians ... took two loud sounds and out of them made a silence. Another constructed a deep darkness out of two brilliant lights.")
- Hot air balloon ("This terrible fowl had no head that we could perceive, but was fashioned entirely of belly, which was of a prodigious fatness and roundness, of a soft-looking substance, smooth, shining and striped with various colors. ... in the interior of which we distinctly saw human beings ... and then let fall upon our heads a heavy sack which proved to be filled with sand!'")

== Publication history ==
The story first appeared in the February 1845 issue of Godey's Lady's Book. Silverman notes that it was among a group of "negligible comic tales" published around the same period, including "The Angel of the Odd" and "The Literary Life of Thingum Bob, Esq." "The Thousand-and-Second Tale of Scheherazade" was reprinted in the October 25, 1845, issue of the Broadway Journal and in 1850 in the posthumous collection Works. It also appeared in the January 1855 Boy's Own Magazine in London in a condensed version and in the May 1928 Amazing Stories science fiction magazine.
