= The Godfather (fairy tale) =

German fairy tale

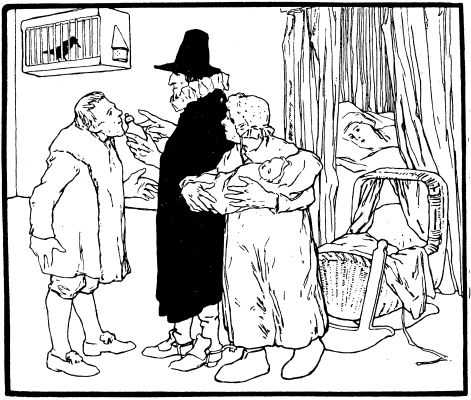
- Illustration by Otto Ubbelohde, 1909

Folk tale
- Name: The Godfather
- Aarne–Thompson grouping: ATU 332
- Country: Germany
- Published in: Grimms' Fairy Tales

"The Godfather" (German: Der Herr Gevatter) is a German fairy tale collected by the Brothers Grimm as tale number 42.

== Synopsis ==
An impoverished man has had so many children that (by the time he has another) he finds that he has already asked everyone in the world to be godparents for his previous children. Befuddled as to how he is supposed to find anyone to act as godparent for his newly-born child, he withdraws to his chamber for the night. While fast asleep, he has a dream that tells him to leave his house and ask the first person he encounters to be his child's godparent. As soon as he awakens, he proceeds to do this. The man he meets and makes godparent of his newly-born child hands the impoverished man a small bottle containing water that the man claims the impoverished man can use to heal the sick, so long as the sickness stems from the head and not the feet.

The impoverished man subsequently becomes both well-known and wealthy because of the magical water. He has a certain bout with treating the child of the King, in which he is able to use the magical water on two successive occasions, but is unable to do so on a third occasion, announcing thus to the King that his child will die.

Not too long after the death of the King's child, the man decides to visit the Godfather (to tell him of his undertakings with the magical water). However, when he arrives at the Godfather's house, he notices that everything there is in disarray. On the first stair, a dustpan and brush quarrel with each other. On the second stair, many fingers lie. On the third stair is a stack of bowls. On the fourth stair are fish that are cooking themselves. On the fifth stair is the Godfather's room, and (when the man looks through the keyhole on the door to the room) he sees the Godfather, donning very long horns. The man opens the door, and (as soon as he does so) the Godfather retreats to a bed and cloaks himself. The man asks the Godfather about the odd happenings occurring in the house, to which the Godfather brushes off most of and counter-claims that the man was seeing things. Once the man brings up the self-cooking fish, however, the fish enter the room and present themselves (on a dish) to the Godfather. Finally, the man brings up how, when peeking through the keyhole on the door to the room, he saw the Godfather with long horns. At this, the Godfather bellows at the man that he is telling falsehoods—frightened by his shouting, the man bolts from the house.

== See also ==
- Godfather Death
