= Vasily Narezhny =

Russian Imperial writer

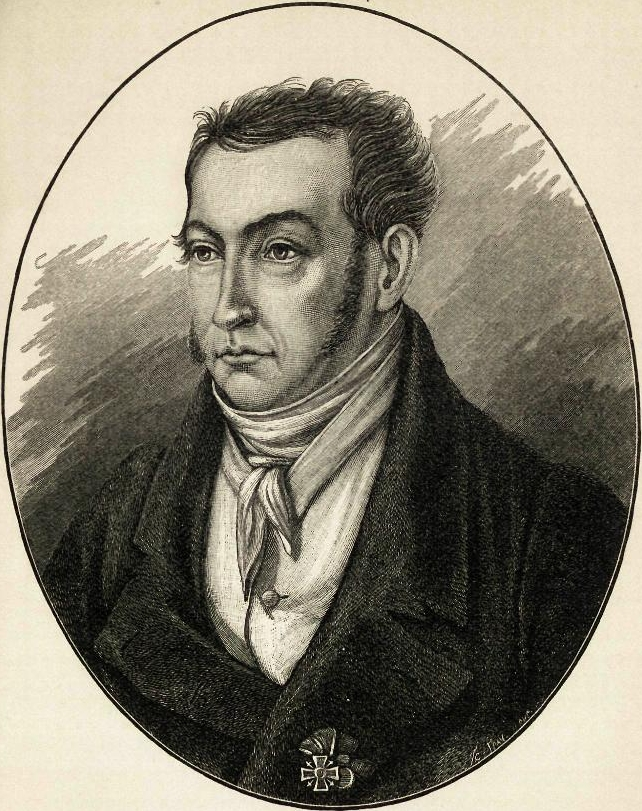

Vasily Trofimovich Narezhny (Russian: Василий Трофимович Нарежный; 1780, Ustivitsa, Mirgorodsky Uyezd, Russian Empire — 3 July [O.S. 21 June] 1825, St. Petersburg) was a Russian Imperial writer best known for his satirical depiction of provincial mores in the vein of the 18th-century picaresque novel.

Narezhny came from a poor Ukrainian szlachta family. He studied at Moscow Imperial University from 1799 to 1801, afterwards serving in the civil service in the Caucasus and in Saint Petersburg. During his time at Moscow Imperial University he wrote several tragedies in the Sturm und Drang style. His work Dmitry the Pretender (Russian: Дмитрий Самозванец) was published in 1804. His collection of stories Slavonic Nights (1809), set in Kievan Rus, was well received.

Perhaps his most famous novel is A Russian Gil Blas (Russian: Российский Жильблаз) (1814), an avowed imitation of Lesage's work. The earthy, humorous realism of this novel established him as the chief predecessor of Gogol in Russian literature. Narezhny's rough, vernacular Russian contrasted sharply with the sensitivity and musicality of the Karamzin school's Gallicized language. His last work, The Divinity Student (Russian: Бурсак) (1824), is a romance about the adventures of a hetman's son; George Grabowicz considered it "probably his best work."

D. S. Mirsky wrote:

Narézhny had a grip on real life, which places him above all the "prehistorical" Russian novelists. But he was too little of an artist, and his books, owing to their heavy style and their diffuseness, are difficult reading. He was in fact little read, and his influence on the development of the Russian novel is almost negligible.

However, his lack of influence also had to do with the immediate suppression of A Russian Gil Blas by the censor; the first three parts were confiscated soon after they appeared and the remaining three were prohibited (the entire work was first published in 1938). Nicholas Crowe takes a more favorable view than Mirsky, calling Narezhnyi "the inheritor and fine-tuner of that solid 18th-century novel-writing tradition in Russia that established prose as a workable and valid medium":

An accomplished writer of novels and short stories alike, he represented the high point of the 18th-century fictional legacy rather than the modes of the rapidly evolving literary environment of the early 19th century in which he happened to find himself working. For imaginative sweep, wit, satirical acuity, and consummate gifts in the art of story-telling one could, during that period, do worse than turn to Narezhnyi...
