= Anthony Farindon =

English royalist divine (1598–1658)

Anthony Farindon (1598 – 9 October 1658), was an English royalist divine.

== Early life ==
Farindon was born at Sonning, Berkshire, and was baptised on 24 December 1598. His name is also spelled Farndon, Faringdon, Farringdon, Farington, and Farrington. He was admitted a scholar of Trinity College, Oxford, on 9 June 1612. He graduated B.A. on 26 June 1616, was admitted a fellow in 1617, and graduated M.A. on 28 March 1620. Later in the same year he joined with fifty-two other masters of arts, including Gilbert Sheldon and Peter Heylyn, in a petition to John Prideaux, the vice-chancellor. On 17 December 1629 he graduated B.D. Henry Ireton, who was admitted as a gentleman-commoner of Trinity College in 1626, was put under discipline by Farindon for some act of insubordination, and the tutor is said to have remarked that Ireton 'would prove either the best or the worst instrument that ever this kingdome bred' (Lloyd).

== Clerical career ==
In 1634 Farindon was presented by John Bancroft, bishop of Oxford, to the vicarage of Bray, Berkshire; and in 1639, through the interest of William Laud, he obtained in addition the post of divinity lecturer in the Chapel Royal at Windsor. Here he acquired the friendship of John Hales of Eton College. He lost his preferments during the First English Civil War. It is said that Ireton, immediately after the second battle of Newbury (27 October 1644), quartered himself on Farindon, and plundered his vicarage out of revenge for the college grievance. Farindon appears to have been superseded by one Brice, afterwards of Henley, Oxfordshire, and Brice, in 1649, by Hezekiah Woodward, an Independent supporter of Oliver Cromwell. What became of Farindon between 1644 and 1647 does not appear. He seems to have left his wife and children in the parish of Bray; the legal fifths, which were to go to their maintenance, were withheld by Woodward; Hales, though himself obliged to sell part of his library, assisted them.

In 1647, through the influence of Sir John Robinson, a kinsman of Laud, Farindon was chosen as minister of St Mary Magdalen, Milk Street. John Bramston wrote that in a short time it was very difficult to get a place. The Milk Street church was known as 'the scholars' church,' and Farindon had Henry Hammond and Robert Sanderson among his auditors. He complied with the existing restrictions by not using the Book of Common Prayer, but this did not save him from the effect of the harsh measures which pursued the sequestered clergy. He is said to have been turned out of his London charge in 1651 or 1652, but this is inconsistent with the date (12 December 1654) of his funeral sermon for Sir George Whitmore. It may be gathered from Walker's statements that he held his position till the taking effect (1 January 1656) of Cromwell's declaration (24 November 1655), which forbade sequestered clergy to preach in public. On the two Sundays preceding his departure a clerical friend preached for him, when the parishioners made collections at the church doors, and presented him with £400.

He returned to the country, and was in the daily habit of paying a visit to Hales, then reduced to a 'mean lodging' at Eton, where in May he died. On learning his friend's circumstances, Farindon said: 'I have at present money to command, and to-morrow will pay you fifty pounds in part of the many sums I and my poor wife have received of you in our great necessities, and will pay you more, suddenly, as you shall want it.' Hales, though nearly at his last shilling of ready money, refused to take a penny from Farindon. It was to Farindon that Hales gave directions for his simple funeral.

== Death ==
Farindon died in the country on 9 October 1658; it is not certain whether he had been allowed to resume his London ministry; he was buried at the church in Milk Street. His will, which is dated 6 October, mentions his sons Anthony and Charles, and four daughters.

== Works ==
Farindon's reputation rests on 130 sermons, of which 31 were published by himself, in a volume dedicated to Robinson, his patron, the remainder by his executors, John Millington and John Powney (son of an old servant of Hales). At the university he had been 'a noted preacher' (Walker).

His works are:

- 'XXX. Sermons,' &c., 1657 (some copies are dated MDCXLVII., the British Museum copy has MDCLVII.; the dedication is dated 20 April 1657; in reality there are thirty-one sermons).
- 'Forty Sermons,' &c. 1663, fol. (edited by Anthony Scattergood for the executors). These two volumes were reprinted in 1672; the reprint differs both in number of sermons (having eight additional) and in their arrangement.
- 'Fifty Sermons,' &c. 1674 (Thomas Jackson thought the sermon on Ps. li. 12 not genuine).

There is a complete edition of the sermons, 1849, 4 vols.

Farindon at the time of his death was collecting materials for a life of Hales. These papers were sent by Millington, his executor, to Izaak Walton, who placed them at the disposal of William Fulman. The paper containing Farindon's account of his last visits to Hales came on Fulman's death into the hands of Archdeacon Davies of Sapperton, Gloucestershire, who communicated it to George Walker. Chalmers, in his life of Hales, made some use of Farindon's materials, as digested by Fulman.
