= Nicolas-Julien Forgeot =

Nicolas-Julien Forgeot (July 1758, Paris – 4 April 1798) was an 18th-century French librettist, man of letters and playwright.

== Biography ==
At first Forgeot devoted himself to literature only as a pastime, and was almost entirely involved in the occupations that gave him a rather important job as an inspector of the postes.

His first play, les Rivaux amis has been described as a trifle. The dialogue was so cut that there were not three tirades with six verse: everything rolled on words that skillful players argued. These kinds of plays, very fashionable some years before the Revolution, were canvasses on which the actors embroidered at will: their silent game, their inflections, gave these pieces all the credit; and when one read the book, one was surprised to find nothing in it.

Les Deux Oncles, in one act, in verse (Paris, 1780, in-8°) was successful. Les Épreuves, which followed les Rivaux Amis, in one act, in verse (1782, in-8°), marked some progress: the characters were more developed, and the style had grace and elegance. The fable, of which the fabric was very slender, offered an ingenuous character, full of candor and naivety. It was one of the brilliant roles of the charming actress Césarine Olivier, who died some time after at a very young age.

During the Revolution, Forgeot, having lost his job, gave himself entirely to literature but did not justify the hopes that his successful comedies Épreuves or La Ressemblance, in three acts, in free verse (1796 in-8°) had suggested. Among several plays he gave in different theatres, only the two-act opera mingled with ariettes, Dettes (1787, in-8°), by Stanislas Champein, performed 8 January 1787, where very humorous scenes were to be found, is remembered.

Librettos:

- 1788: Le rival confident, comedy set in music by Grétry
- 1795: La caverne, opera by Étienne Méhul
- 1795: Le mensonge officieux, one-act comedy, music by Jean-Baptiste Lemoyne

Forgeot died from a chest complaint.

== Sources ==
- Répertoire du théâtre français, t. 28, 1819, 389 p., p. 67.
