= Johann Cloppenburg =

Dutch Calvinist theologian (1592–1652)

Johann Cloppenburg (1592–1652) was a Dutch Calvinist theologian. He is known as a controversialist, and as a contributor to federal theology. He also made some detailed comments on the moral status of financial and banking transactions.

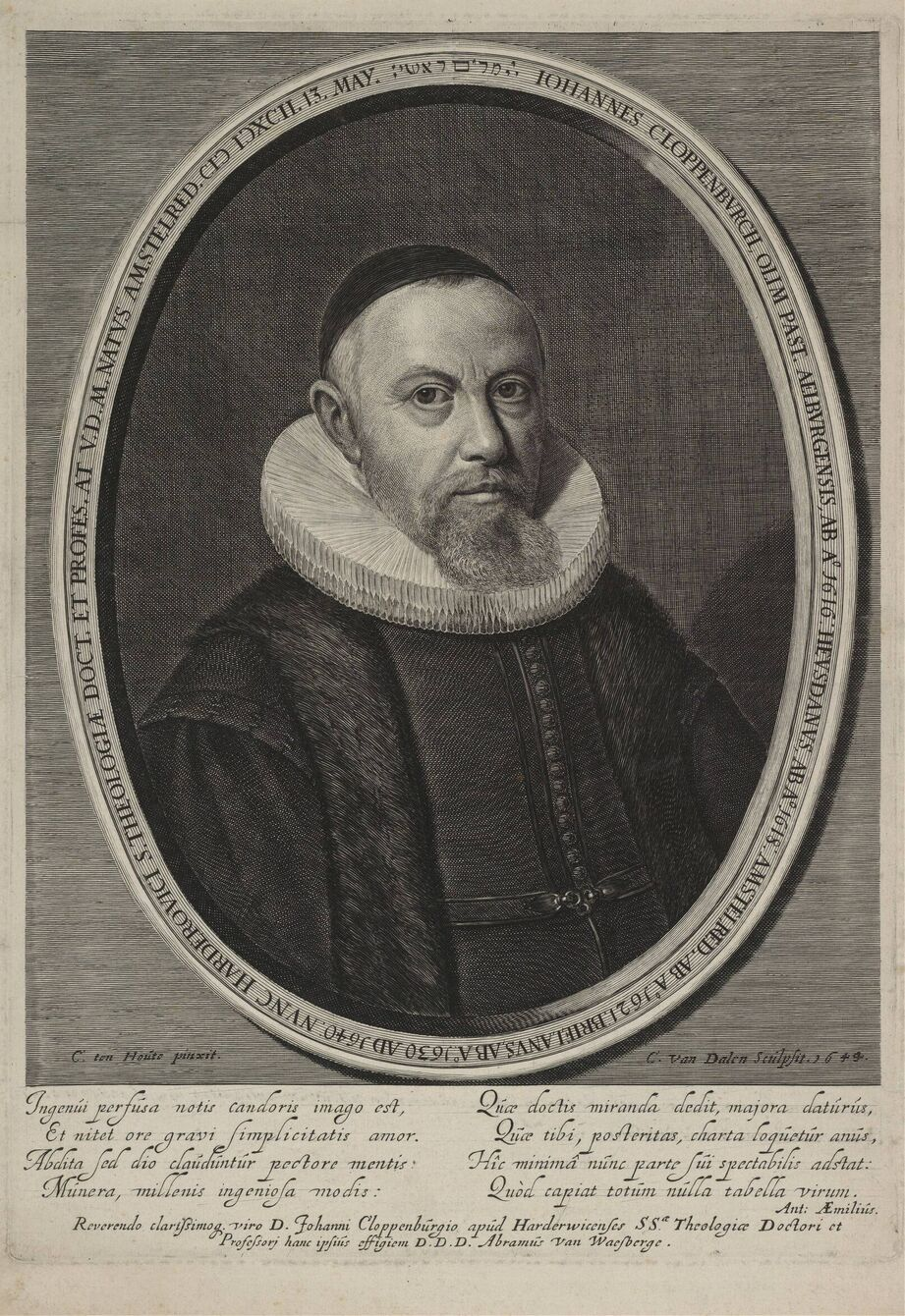
Johann Cloppenburg, 1644 engraving by Cornelis van Dalen.

== Life ==
He was born in Amsterdam, and studied at the University of Leiden, where he made a lifelong friendship with Gisbertus Voetius. With Voetius he opposed the appointment of Conrad Vorstius at Leiden, after the death of Jacobus Arminius. He then spent a period studying and travelling abroad. One journey in 1615 took him from Saumur to Basel, with a manuscript of Philippe de Mornay based on the Pugio Fidei of Ramón Martí. In Germany he visited Herborn, Marburg and Heidelberg.

Cloppenburg returned to the Netherlands in 1616 as a preacher at Aalburg. A Gomarist, he took part in a disputation against Remonstrants at Bleiswijk. He went to support Voetius at Heusden, who since 1617 had faced opposition from the Remonstrant Johannes Grevius. He was a preacher at Amsterdam from 1621 to 1626, when he clashed with the local authorities over an Arminian merchant. He then moved on to Brielle.

Cloppenburg was appointed professor at the University of Harderwijk in 1641. There he quarrelled with his colleague Antonius Deusing in 1643; and left the following year. He moved to the University of Franeker in the province of Fryslan, where Johannes Cocceius had arrived shortly before. Together they developed federal theology.

== Works ==
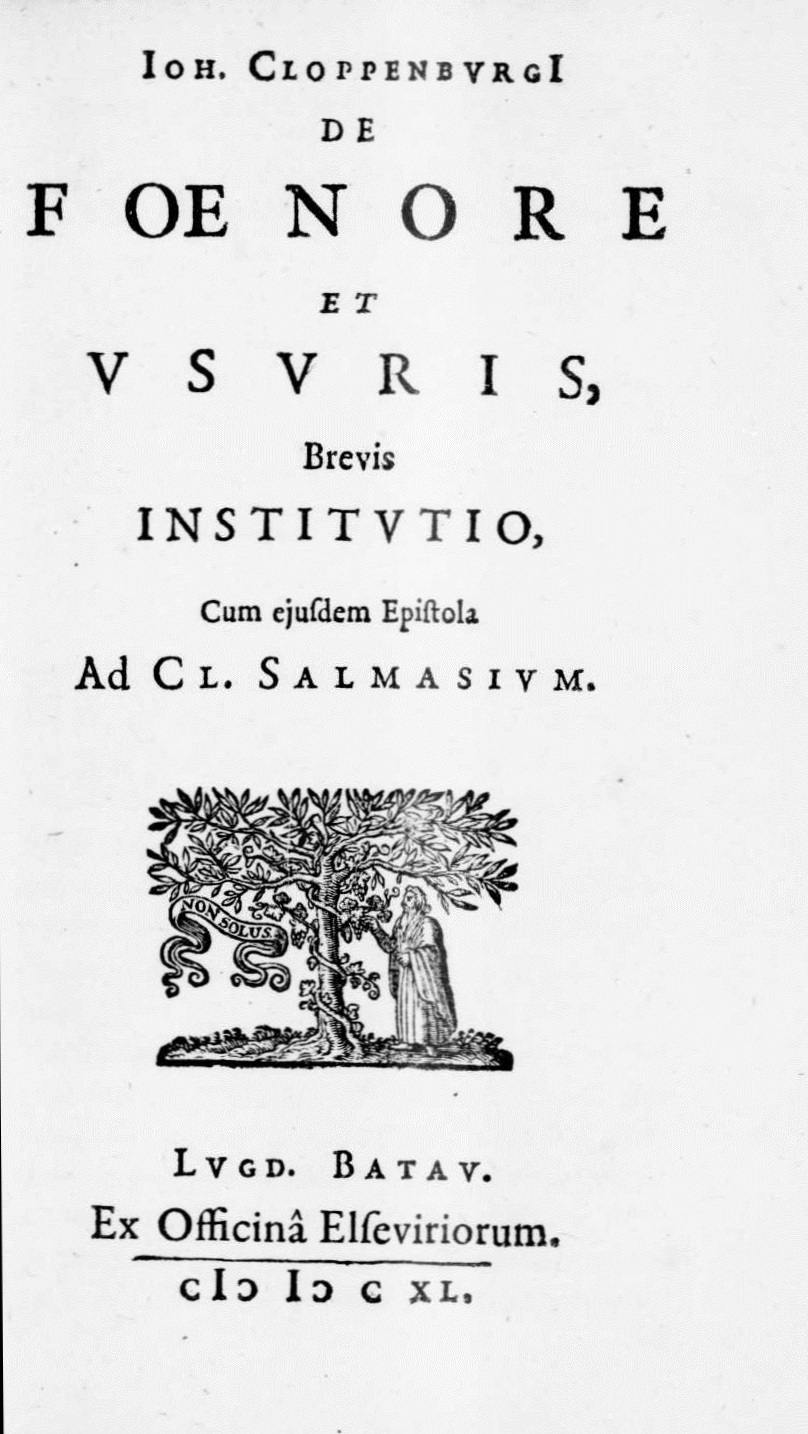
De foenore et usuris brevis institutio, 1640

- Gangraena theologiae Anabaptisticae, first Dutch version 1625 with subtitle Cancker van de leere der weder-dooperen. A Latin version was published in 1645. It was cited by Robert Baillie and William Prynne, and possible influenced the Gangraena (1646) of Thomas Edwards. There was a further Latin edition (1656). Friedrich Spanheim supplied the appendix Diatriba historica de origine, progressu et sectis anabaptistarum.
- Trou-hertinge Aenwysinge van theologische Redenen (1627)
- Trouhertige vermaninge (1629)
- Kort begrijp van der Leere der Socinianer (1630). A Dutch work against the Socinians, it appeared with a Dutch translation of a work of Fausto Sozzini, the De officio hominis Christiani. It was later republished (Kort begrijp van de opkomste ende leere der Socinianen) as part of the Latin Compendiolum Socinianismi Confutatum (1652). It also included writings of the Polish Socinians Krzysztof Ostorodt and Andrzej Wojdowski, confiscated at the end of the 16th century.
- Epistola ad virum Cl. D. Ludovicum de Dieu, qua expenditur controversia inter Baronium et Casaubonum (1634). Based on correspondence between Cloppenburg and Louis de Dieu at Leiden, it dealt with exegetical questions, and formed the basis of a contribution to the Critici Sacri.

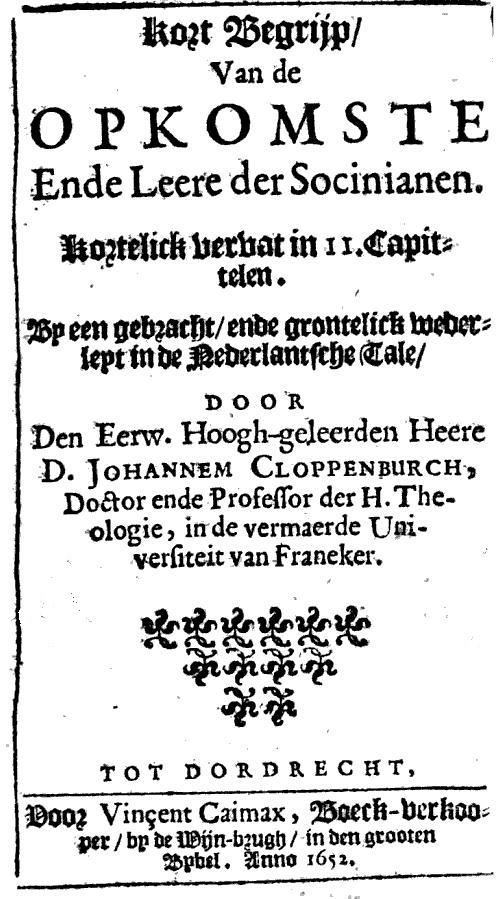
Title page from Kort begrijp van de opkomste ende leere der Socinianen (1652).

- Sacrificiorum patriachalium Schola cum Spicilegio (1637)
- Christelijcke onderwijsinge van woecker, interessen, coop van renten (1637)
- De foenore et usuris, brevis institutio: cum ejusdem epistola ad Cl. Salmasium (in Latin). Leiden: Bonaventura Elzevier et Abraham Elzevier. 1640. A response to his one-time friend Salmasius, in the controversy over usury, delayed by the printers.
- Vindiciae pro deitate spiritus sancti, adversus Pneumatomachum, Johan. Bidellum, Anglum (1652); a reply to the first book of John Biddle, which Cloppenburg had been shown on a visit to Bristol.
- Anti-Smalcius, de divinitate Jesu Christi (1652). This work against Valentinus Smalcius arose as one of many dissertations from Cloppenburg's Hungarian students at Franeker.
- Exercitationes super locos communes theologicos (1653)
- Syntagma selectarum exercitationum theologicarum (1655).

His Theologica opera omnia were published in 1684; the editor Johannes à Marck was his grandson.
