= The Angel of the Odd =

- Short story by Edgar Allan Poe
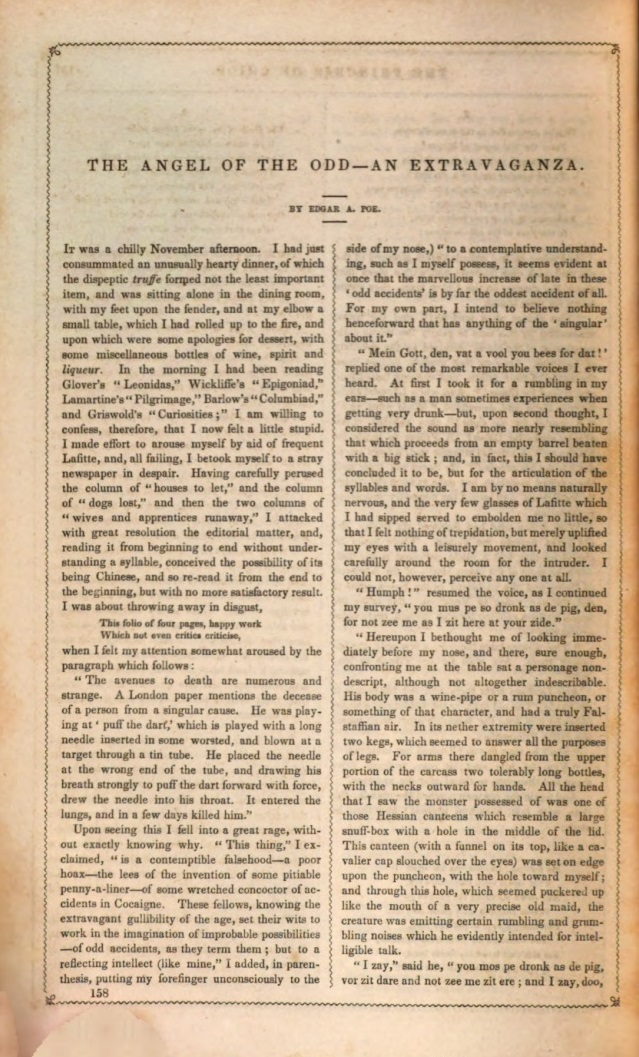
- Original title: The Angel of the Odd: An Extravaganza
- Country: United States
- Language: English
- Genres: Satire, Humor; Short story

Publication
- Publisher: The Columbian Magazine
- Publication date: October 1844

"The Angel of the Odd" is a satirical short story by Edgar Allan Poe, first published in 1844 in The Columbian Lady's and Gentleman's Magazine.

== Plot summary ==
The story follows an unnamed narrator, who reads a story about a man who died after accidentally sucking a needle down his throat while playing a game known as "puff the dart". He rages at the gullibility of humanity for believing such a hoax. He vows never to fall for such odd stories. Just then, a strange-looking creature made of a keg and wine bottles appears. The creature announces in a heavy accent that he is the Angel of the Odd — and that he is responsible for causing such strange events.

The man, unconvinced, drives the angel away and takes an alcohol-induced nap. Instead of a 20-minute nap, he wakes up two hours later, having missed an appointment to renew his fire insurance. Ironically, his house has caught fire and his only escape is out a window using a ladder the crowd below has provided for him. As he steps down, a hog brushes against the ladder, causing the narrator to fall and fracture his arm.

Later, the narrator's attempts at wooing a rich woman to be his wife end in failure when she realizes he is wearing a wig, which he must wear since the fire in his apartment singed off his hair. He then tries to woo another woman who also leaves him, scoffing at the man for ignoring her as she passes. In reality, a particle had gotten into his eye, momentarily blinding him, just as she passed.

Finally, the narrator decides his ill fortune is cause for him to end his life. He decides to commit suicide by drowning himself in a river after removing his clothes ("for there is no reason why we cannot die as we were born", he says). However, a crow runs off with "the most indispensable portion" of his clothes and the man chases after it. As he is running, the narrator unknowingly runs off a cliff. Fortunately, he grabs on to the long rope of a hot air balloon as it happens to be floating by. The Angel of the Odd appears and makes him admit that the bizarre really can happen. The narrator agrees, but is unable to physically perform a pledge that the Angel of the Odd demands because of his fractured arm. The Angel then cuts the rope and the man falls down onto his newly-rebuilt house through the chimney, before landing in the dining room. The man then realizes this was his punishment. "Thus revenged himself the Angel of the Odd."

== Allusions ==
The introductory paragraph of the story alludes (by last name only) to several authors, particularly Richard Glover and William Wilkie. The story also refers to Curiosities of Literature by Rufus Wilmot Griswold and Isabel, or Sicily, a Pilgrimage by Henry Theodore Tuckerman. The narrator also falls asleep while reading "The Omnipresence of the Deity" by Robert Montgomery, a poem which explores the idea that life is a grand design rather than one of chance.

== Publication history ==
"The Angel of the Odd" was first published in The Columbian Magazine in October 1844 in New York. Its original full title was "The Angel of the Odd: An Extravaganza". Poe biographer Kenneth Silverman notes that the story was produced in the same period as other "negligible comic tales" by Poe including "The Thousand-and-Second Tale of Scheherazade" and "The Literary Life of Thingum Bob, Esq."

Inspiration for the story may have come from three sources that offer similar themes or plot points: an article titled "It's Very Odd" from the January 1829 issue of Blackwood's Magazine, "Progress of Social Questions" from the New York Tribune on June 8, 1844, and the novel The Man About Town by Cornelius Webbe.

== Analysis ==
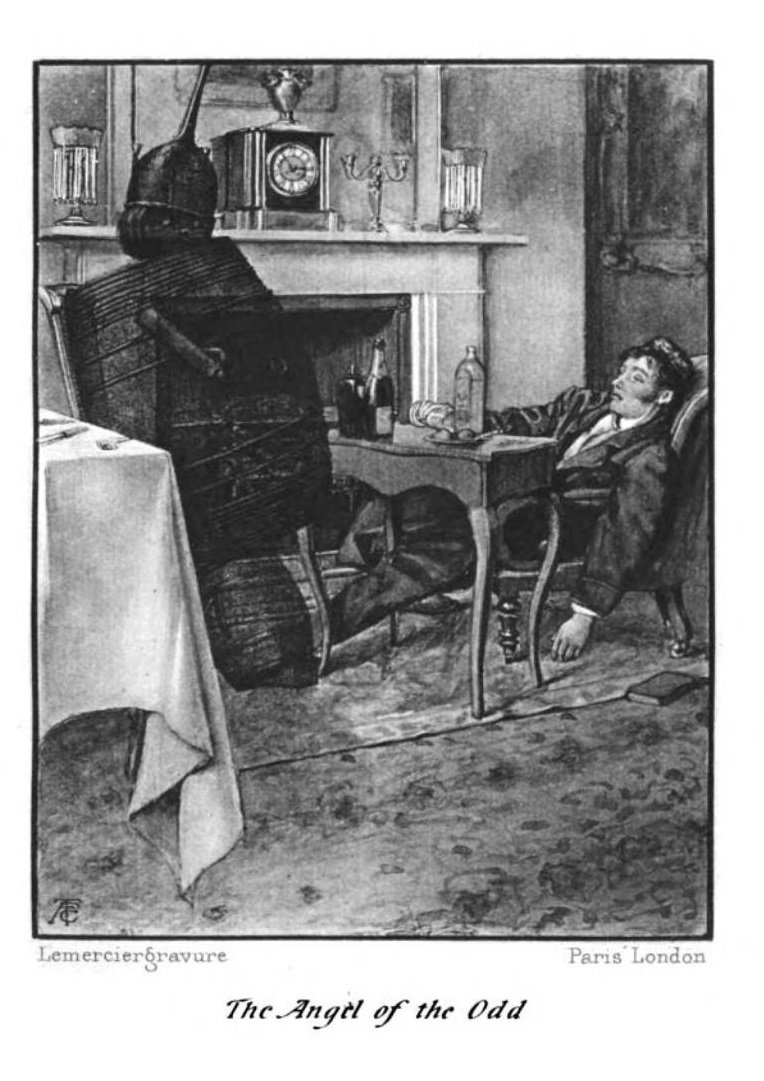
Illustration to the story, 1895

The story is especially interesting as it was published only six months after Poe's own great hoax, "The Balloon-Hoax", which many believed to be true despite its elements of the odd.

Scholar Maurice S. Lee notes that the "madcap" comedy of the story can draw comparisons to The Life and Opinions of Tristram Shandy, Gentleman, Buster Keaton, and Wile E. Coyote, but that Poe's story also serves as a "meta-critical self-defense" of the bizarre events he presents in his own fiction. Lee also notes that in creating the Angel of the Odd, Poe allows for both a heavenly agent that directs life events while acknowledging that improbable, even miraculous events, can occur spontaneously. Scholar Dawn Sova summarizes the story as, "Poe's satire on the philosophy of human perfectibility".

Because the story also focuses on the narrator's readings, the story also implies that readers should stop being skeptical and believe all printed words are truthful. The idea is reinforced by noting that all of the narrator's difficulties begin when he makes the resolution no longer to believe what he reads. Nevertheless, the initial incident which propels the plot, the narrator reading about a game of "puff the dart", may have been a censure of the system of puffery prevalent among literary critics of the era.

However, the narrator is also an unreliable narrator, having consumed large amounts of food and alcohol before telling his story. Scholar Jonathan Hartmann notes that the story is a more light-hearted temperance tale with a similar message as the darker toned "The Black Cat". Psychoanalyst Marie Bonaparte believed the character and plot reflected Poe's own struggle with alcoholism.

The Angel of the Odd speaks with an unusual dialect, which Poe biographer Arthur Hobson Quinn said "was not spoken anywhere on the globe". Silverman referred to it as "a phunny German-Dutch dialect". Scholar Emily Ogden notes that the Angel of the Odd's accent is "as odd as his accidents".
