= Siméon Marotte de Muis =

Siméon Marotte de Muis (Latin: Muisius) (1587–1644) was a French churchman and Hebraist, professor at the Collège du roi from 1614, and biblical commentator.

== Life ==
Born in Orléans, he became Archdeacon of Soissons.

== Works ==
He entered the controversy around the Paris Polyglot. He defended the purity of the transmitted Masoretic text of the Torah against the views of the Oratorian Morinus (Jean Morin) on the use of the Samaritan Pentateuch, expressed in his Exercitationes Ecclesiasticae (1631). De Muis attacked Morinus in his Assertio Veritatis Hebraicae (1631 and 1634) and his Castigatio Animadversionum Morini (1639). His criticisms and those of Valérien de Flavigny went far enough to reflect adversely on the Latin Vulgate and Septuagint. It has been traditionally recounted that Cardinal Richelieu, wishing to be patron of the Polyglotte but rebuffed by Michel Le Jay whose project it was, encouraged de Muis, who produced detailed criticisms that remained unpublished.

His notes on the Book of Genesis were printed in the Critici Sacri. His commentary on the Psalms was published in 1630, and his collected works in 1650.
