= La caverne (Méhul) =

Opera by Étienne-Nicolas Méhul

Méhul in 1799 – portrait by Antoine Gros

La caverne (The Cavern) is an opera by the French composer Étienne Méhul. It takes the form of a comédie en prose in three acts. It premiered at the Opéra-Comique, Paris on 5 December 1795. The libretto, by Nicolas-Julien Forgeot, is based on incidents from the novel Gil Blas by Alain-René Lesage.

Méhul's opera enjoyed only limited success, with 22 performances. Arthur Pougin ascribes this to the competition from Le Sueur's opera of the same title, based on the same events from Gil Blas, first staged at the Théâtre Feydeau in February 1793. Le Sueur's La caverne was one of the most popular works of the 1790s. With such a rival, Pougin writes, "failure was almost certain" for Méhul's work, despite the excellence of the cast.

== Roles ==
Information from Bartlet (1999), p. 337.

Role	Voice type	Premiere Cast
Sainville	haute-contre	Philippe Cauvy, called 'Philippe'
Ambrosio, a canon	tenor	Jean-Pierre Solié
Léonore, his niece	soprano	Anne-Marie Simonet called 'Mme Crétu'
Alvar, in love with Léonore	baritone	Augustin Alexandre d'Herbez called 'Saint-Aubin'
Gil Blas	soprano (travesti role)	Marie Gabrielle Malagrida, called 'Mlle Carline'
Rolando	baritone	Simon Chenard
Léonarde	soprano	Françoise Carpentier, called 'Mme Gonthier'
Frontin	baritone	Jean-Blaise Martin
Fabrin	haute-contre	Jean-Baptiste-Sauveur Gavaudan
Domingo	tenor	Louis Michu
A lieutenant	tenor	Mr Grangé

== Synopsis ==
The following synopsis and comments are translated from a contemporary review in La décade philosophique, littéraire et politique:

"Ambrosio, an avaricious canon, has a pretty niece called Léonore, betrothed to a Frenchman who has never been near the house or the niece. This is all rather improbable but it is also necessary so the author can produce a charming situation in his first act. As you will see.

"Alvar, another character in love with the niece, comes to elope with her while her uncle the canon is absent, but his coach overturns in a ravine on the way, hampering his plan. Luckily, Léonore's fiancé arrives. Alvar recognises him: 'It's him!' 'It's you!'; it's his friend. Alvar explains how he plans to elope with the young person who lives nearby and tells him of the accident which has hindered him. The fiancé, with the best grace in the world, offers him his own sedan chair. Alvar takes advantage of the offer, goes to look for his mistress and both of them run off after paying their respects to the fiancé.

"Ambrosio returns and, before he can enter his house, is robbed by Gil Blas who, watched by the rest of the robber band, approaches the canon and timidly demands his purse or his life.

"In the second act we find ourselves in the [robbers'] cavern. Léonore has been kidnapped by the robbers; she is freed by Gil Blas. As in the novel, he pretends to be indisposed and is thus excused from following the robber band on an expedition they are undertaking. However, at the very moment they are about to escape, he is surprised by one of the bandits who has been left behind; but this bandit is disarmed in turn by the negro who helps them and escapes with them himself. Old Léonarde also appears in this act, but neither she nor the negro have the same eccentric characters they have in the novel. I will say nothing of the inconvenience of having Gil Blas played by a woman (Citizen Carline) - it shocks common sense. If the idea was the work of the performers, then theirs is the blame.

"In this act, the theatre represents a cavern and the forest above it simultaneously; we see the characters pass through the forest as they leave the cavern: they blend their voices with those of the characters below, resulting in some quite beautiful musical effects. But I am astonished that with this scenery at their disposal the authors did not make the inhabitants of the cavern and those of the forest - who are unaware of what is happening below - sing arias of differing characters. The joyful song of a woodcutter, for example, would have made a contrast with the plaintive cries of the prisoners, and the effect might have been striking.

"The third act takes place in the forest but it would be futile for me to pretend I could summarise what happens. All I know is that there are pistol shots and rifle shots; the canon, the fiancé, the lover, the robbers, the lady - all meet up again pell-mell and apparently it all ends to the satisfaction of everyone, even the audience, because they demanded a curtain call for the authors, who are Citizen Forgeot (for the poem) and Méhul (for the music)."

== Sources ==
- Adélaïde de Place Étienne Nicolas Méhul (Bleu Nuit Éditeur, 2005)
- Arthur Pougin Méhul: sa vie, son génie, son caractère (Fischbacher, 1889)
- Elizabeth Bartlet: General introduction to Méhul's operas in her edition of Stratonice (Pendragon Press, 1997)
- Elizabeth Bartlet, Etienne-Nicolas Méhul and Opera: Source and Archival Studies of Lyric Theatre during the French Revolution, Consulate and Empire (Etudes sur l'opera francais du XIXeme siecle) (Galland, 1999)
