= Nicholas Fuller =

Nicholas Fuller (c. 1557 – 1626) was an English Hebraist and philologist.

== Life ==
The son of Robert Fuller by his wife Catharine Cresset, he was a native of Hampshire, and was born about 1557. He was sent to schools at Southampton, kept by John Horlock and Adrian Saravia. He entered, in the capacity of secretary, the household of Robert Horne, bishop of Winchester; and on his death through the influence of William Barlow who was Horne's brother-in-law, continued as secretary to John Watson.

On Watson's death in 1584, he determined to live a scholar's life. His means were insufficient for his purpose, but he obtained an appointment as tutor to William and Oliver Wallop, sons of Henry Wallop, and, accompanying them to Oxford, instructed them by day, while he pursued his own studies at night. He was a member of Hart Hall, Oxford and graduated B.A. 30 January 1586, and M.A. 30 March 1590. He found a friend in Robert Abbot, took orders, and was presented to the ill-paid living of Allington in Wiltshire. The duties were light, and Fuller applied himself to the study of languages, especially in their bearing on theology.

He corresponded with foreign scholars, and in 1612 he published at Heidelberg, at Sir Henry Wallop's expense, Miscellaneorum Theologicorum. Fuller in 1616 corrected and had printed another at Oxford under his own supervision. To this he added a fourth book and a preface, partly autobiographical. He had in the meantime, 14 October 1612, become a prebendary of Salisbury Cathedral through Henry Cotton. A third edition of the Miscellaneorum was published at Leyden in 1622, with the addition of an Apologia, a good-humoured reply to Drusius, who had attacked him in his Notes on the Pentateuch. Another edition issued in 1650, after Fuller's death, contained two more books. The work was also reprinted in John Pearson's Critici Sacri.

Fuller left several manuscripts; his 'Dissertatio de nomine יהוה' was published in Adriaan Reland's Decas exercitationum philologicarum (1707). He also compiled a lexicon, which may not have been completed, and was not published. He died in 1626. He is spoken of in high terms of admiration by Buxtorf (Dissertatio de Nominibus Hebrais) and by Edward Pocock (Nota Miscellanea in Portam Mosis). Thomas Fuller describes him as 'happy in pitching on (not difficult trifles, but) useful difficulties tending to the understanding of scripture,' and adds that 'he was most eminent for humility'. Fuller was married, and had a son and daughter named Michael and Catharine.
