= Hadrian à Saravia =

Protestant clergyman and theologian (1532–1612)

- Born: 1532; Hesdin, Artois, Spanish Netherlands (now France)
- Died: January 15, 1612 (aged 79–80); Canterbury, United Kingdom
- Other names: Adrian Saravia, Adrianus Saravia
- Known for: Translator of King James Version of the Bible
- Spouses: Catherine d'Allez (1561–1606); Marguerite Wiits (1608–1612)

Hadrian à Saravia, sometimes called Hadrian Saravia, Adrien Saravia, or Adrianus Saravia (1532 – 15 January 1612) was a Protestant theologian and pastor from the Low Countries who became an Anglican prebend and a member of the First Westminster Company charged by James I of England to produce the King James Version of the Bible.

== Early years ==
Saravia was born in Hesdin (Artois), then part of Flanders, to Protestant Spanish and Flemish parents, Christopher de Saravia and Elisabeth Boulengier. He entered the ministry at Antwerp, reviewed a draft of the Belgic Confession and gathered a Walloon congregation in Brussels. Saravia continued to move between London and Europe. In 1561, he married Catherine d'Allez of St Omer. The marriage would last 45 years, and the couple had one son and an unknown number of daughters. Following the death of Catherine, Saravia married Marguerite Wiits in 1608.

== Channel Islands ==
He went from there to England and was sent as an evangelist to Jersey and Guernsey. When Elizabeth I of England founded Elizabeth College in 1563 he was appointed as its first schoolmaster.

In 1568 he became rector of the parish of St Pierre du Bois, Guernsey, which was then under Presbyterian discipline.

== Southampton ==
From 1571 to 1578, he held the position of headmaster at the Grammar School in Southampton. His students included Robert Ashley, Nicholas Fuller, Francis Markham, Edward Reynolds, Sir Thomas Lake, and Josuah Sylvester.

== Ghent and Leiden ==
By late 1580 he was living in Ghent and was an inspector of the theological school and active in religious affairs. With Ghent under threat by the Spanish, he moved to Leiden in November 1582. He was appointed a professor of theology at Leiden University on 13 August 1584 and was Rector Magnificus for 1585 and 1586. From Leiden he wrote (9 June 1585) to William Cecil, 1st Baron Burghley advising the assumption of the protectorate of the Low Countries by Elizabeth. He left the United Provinces when his complicity in a political plot was discovered.

== Return to England ==
He published several treatises defending the Episcopacy against Presbyterianism. He was appointed, in 1588, rector of Tatenhill, Staffordshire. His first work, De diversis gradibus ministrorum Evangelii (1590; in English, 1592, and reprinted), was an argument for episcopacy, which led to a controversy with Theodore Beza and gained him incorporation as DD at Oxford (9 June 1590), and a prebend at Gloucester (22 October 1591).

On 6 December 1595 he was admitted to a canonry at Canterbury (which he resigned in 1602), and in the same year to the vicarage of Lewisham, Kent, where he became an intimate friend of Richard Hooker, his near neighbour, whom he absolved on his deathbed. He was made prebendary of Worcester in 1601 and of Westminster (5 July 1601). In 1604, or early in 1605, he presented to James I of England his Latin treatise on the Eucharist, which remained in the Royal Library unprinted, until in 1885 it was published (with translation and introduction) by Archdeacon G. A. Denison.

In 1607 he was nominated one of the translators of the King James Version of the Bible of 1611, his part being Genesis to the end of Kings II. He is said to have been the only translator who was not English.

On 23 March 1610 he exchanged Lewisham for the rectory of Great Chart, Kent. He died at Canterbury on 15 January 1612, and was buried in the cathedral. His second wife, Margaret Wiits, erected a memorial to him at the Cathedral.

== Theology ==
Saravia is one of the first Protestant mission theologians. In his ecclesiological writing De diversis ministrorum Evangelii gradibus sicut a domino fuerunt instituti of 1590, he referred to the Church’s missionary command, which he believes is valid for all times. In the episcopate, which goes back to the apostles (apostolic succession), the Church has the authority to send out missionaries. This view was criticized by Protestant theologians, among them Theodor Beza and Johann Gerhard, who, like many of the Reformation and Old Protestant theologians, believed that the missionary command had already been fully fulfilled in the time of the Apostles.

== Sources ==
- Werner Raupp (Ed.): Mission in Quellentexten. Geschichte der Deutschen Evangelischen Mission von der Reformation bis zur Weltmissionskonferenz Edinburgh 1910, Erlangen/Bad Liebenzell 1990 (ISBN 3-87214-238-0 / 3-88002-424-3), S. 61–63 (Introduction; – Sources: De diversis ministrorum evangelii gradibus, sicut a domino fuerunt instituti […], London 1590, p. 37-39; – Literature).
