= Anthony Scattergood =

English clergyman and scholar

Anthony Scattergood (or Antony; 1611–1687) was an English clergyman and scholar.

== Life ==
He was eldest of the twelve children of John Skatergood of Chaddesden, Derbyshire, by his wife Elizabeth, daughter of Francis Baker, yeoman, of Ellastone, a village in North Staffordshire. The parents were married at Ellastone on 18 Dec. 1608, and Antony was baptised there on 18 September 1611. He matriculated at Trinity College, Cambridge as a sizar on 17 December 1628, graduating B.A. in 1633.

His friends at Cambridge included William Sancroft and John Pearson. Taking holy orders, he acted as chaplain at Trinity College from 1637 to 1640. On 2 April 1641 he was admitted to the rectory of Winwick, Northamptonshire, on the presentation of John Williams, bishop of Lincoln. This living he held till his death. He received a canonry in Lincoln Cathedral on 6 May 1641, and became chaplain and librarian to the bishop.

In June 1663 he received, at the king's request, the degree of D.D. at Cambridge, in consideration of his great abilities and ‘sufficience in learning’. In 1664 Scattergood received the prebend of Sawley in Lichfield Cathedral, to which the treasurership of the cathedral was attached; he became chaplain to Bishop John Hacket On 16 August 1666 he received another Lichfield prebend, that of Pipa Minor, and in 1669 the living of Yelvertoft, near Winwick, which he continued to hold with Winwick. On 13 July 1669 he was incorporated D.D. at Oxford at the opening of the Sheldonian Theatre.

In 1682 he resigned his prebend of Lichfield and that of Lincoln. In both benefices he was succeeded by his son Samuel. He died on 30 July 1687, and was buried in the chancel of Yelvertoft church. White Kennett, while bishop of Peterborough, purchased in 1724–5 Scattergood's ‘choice collection of books’ from Mr. Smith, bookseller, of Daventry.

== Works ==
He contributed Latin verses to the university collections in honour respectively of the Duke of York in 1633, of the Princess Elizabeth in 1635, and of Charles I, on the birth of his fifth child, in 1637. In the last year Greek verses by him were prefixed to J. Duport's ‘Liber Job.’

From an unprinted manuscript in John Williams's library he edited ‘Annotationes in Vetus Testamentum et in Epistolam ad Ephesios,’ Cambridge, 1653 (new edit. Frankfort, 1704). The authorship is uncertain.

Meanwhile, he joined with John Pearson, the latter's brother Richard, and Francis Gouldman, in compiling a collection of biblical criticism which was intended to supplement Brian Walton's Polyglot Bible. Their efforts resulted in Critici Sacri sive Doctissimorum Virorum in SS. Biblia Annotationes et Tractatus, which was published in nine folio volumes in 1660, with a dedication to Charles II (another edition Frankfort, 1696; 2nd edition Amsterdam, 1698). Scattergood corrected nearly the whole work for the press.

On 8 March 1662 Scattergood and Dillingham were directed by convocation to see through the press the amended Book of Common Prayer.

In 1666 he prefixed a Greek ode to Duport's Δαβίδης ἔμμετρος, and in 1676 Duport returned the compliment by including a eulogy on him in his ‘Musæ Subsecivæ.’ Scattergood edited in 1672 (2nd edit.) ‘XLVII Sermons by Antony Farindon.’ He was long occupied in a revision of Schrevelius's Greek lexicon, first published in 1645, and he prepared a new edition (adding 5000 words) of Thomas's Latin dictionary in 1678. He is further credited with having brought up to a total of 33,145 the number of references to parallel passages in a folio edition of the Bible issued at Cambridge in 1678 by the university printer, J. Hayes. This number exceeds by 7,250 the references found in Hayes's edition of the Bible of 1677. No copy of the 1678 edition is known to be extant, but a quarto edition printed by Hayes appeared in 1683, and repeats Scattergood's embellishments.

== Family ==
Scattergood married Martha, daughter of Thomas Wharton, merchant of London. She died in December 1654, being buried at Winwick. By her Scattergood had two sons—Samuel and John—and one daughter, Elizabeth.

== Notes ==
Attribution

This article incorporates text from a publication now in the public domain: "Scattergood, Antony". Dictionary of National Biography. London: Smith, Elder & Co. 1885–1900.
