= Francis Gouldman =

17th-century English Anglican clergyman and lexicographer

- Born: c. 1607
- Died: 1688/1689
- Education: Christ's College, Cambridge
- Occupations: Church of England clergyman, lexicographer
- Notable work: A Copious Dictionary in Three Parts
- Spouse: Abigail

Francis Gouldman (c. 1607–1688/89) was a Church of England clergyman and lexicographer whose Latin-English dictionary (1664) went through several editions. Gouldman was also one of the directors who oversaw the publication of the monumental Critici sacri, a major collection of Biblical criticism.

== Life ==
Gouldman earned his master's degree from Christ's College, Cambridge. His father was George Gouldman, also spelled Gowldman, who was a rector of South Ockendon, Essex. His son succeeded him, and held the position from 26 March 1634 until his death, with one hiatus. In 1644, he was caught up in Reformation church politics, and an ejectment was brought against him. "He appeareth to be ill affected," the text of the ejectment read, "and an Idle Minister," grounds for which claim might have been found in his refusal to preach more than once on the Sabbath or fast days, and going for nine years without catechizing his parishioners. In the view of J.E.B. Mayor, the case "shows how little his enemies could find to object against this laborious scholar," and he was later restored. Gouldman was, however, undeniably outspoken from the pulpit, fomenting against Parliament and taxation.

His wife's name was Abigail. They had five children.

== Latin dictionary ==
A Copious Dictionary in Three Parts provided explanations and etymologies, though criticized as rambling and obscure by his successor and rival, Elisha Coles. The second edition was published in 1669, with a third in 1674 and a fourth in 1678. Gouldman's stated intention was to provide "correct and plentiful observations, and phraseological explanations," as well as "the proper names of persons, places, and other things necessary to the understanding of historians and poets." Gouldman's approach was inclusionist: he explained "barbarous" forms instead of correcting or omitting them. His work was revised along more prescriptive lines by Adam Littleton for greater purity of Latinity.

Gouldman's dictionary was one of the works for which Cambridge University Press was most known in the 17th century. Thomas Parson is said by Edmund Calamy to have helped it through the press, working also on the front matter and indexing; but his name does not appear in connection with the book.

== Critici sacri ==
Under the direction of Gouldman, John Pearson and Anthony Scattergood, the nine-volume Critici Sacri was published in London in 1660 with a dedication to Charles II. Intended as a companion to the Polyglott Bible of Brian Walton (1657), Critici sacri was a collection of essays on Biblical interpretation, antiquities, textual criticism and exegesis by the most significant theologians of the time.

At the beginning of the 19th century, the theologian Adam Clarke considered Critici sacri the most important collection of Biblical criticism ever made, and in the 21st century it is still recognized as a great work.

== In fiction ==
Gouldman was an interlocutor along with the 2nd-century grammarian Hesychius in one of the satirical dialogues of William King. "Gouldman" chides the ancient lexicographer for boasting of the attention he receives from pedants, pointing out that philological learnedness has little value for the man of action.
