= Death's Friend =

1852 novella by Pedro Antonio de Alarcón

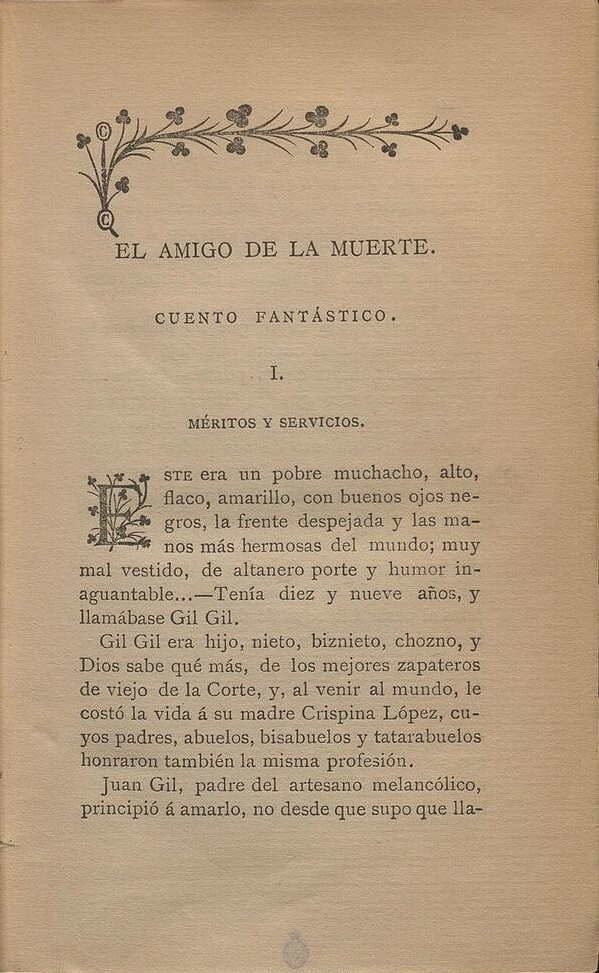
- First page in Narraciones inverosímiles
- Author: Pedro Antonio de Alarcón
- Original title: El amigo de la muerte
- Language: Spanish
- Publication date: 1852
- Publication place: Spain
- Pages: 114

Death's Friend (Spanish: El amigo de la muerte) is an 1852 novella by the Spanish writer Pedro Antonio de Alarcón. It is about an orphan in 18th-century Spain and is a variation of the folk tale "Godfather Death", which Alarcón said he had heard from his grandmother. The story was first published in El eco de Occidente in 1852 and revised for publication in Las Américas in 1858–1859. It was included in Alarcón's 1882 collection Narraciones inverosímiles.

One of Alarcón's ambitions with the story was to counter French influence on Spanish literature, which made him reuse the Spanish main character from the French novel Gil Blas in a Spanish story. Scholarship about Death's Friend has primarily focused on its relationship with oral tradition and its place within the fantastical genre.
