= William Adlington =

English translator

William Adlington (fl. 1566) was one among the host of translators that made the Elizabethan era the "golden age of translations". His translation of Apuleius' 2nd-century CE novel Metamorphoses, better known by its English title The Golden Ass (1566, reprinted 1571, 1582, 1596), was its first appearance in English and has been steadily reprinted into the 20th century. His prose is bold and delightful, though he does not stick as close to his source as a modern translator would be expected to do, in part because he had probably translated from a French edition of the text alongside the original Latin. The book was a favourite source of Shakespeare's. He addressed his dedication to Thomas, Earl of Sussex, from "University College in Oxenford", but so little is known of him that he did not rate a vita in the Dictionary of National Biography. A connection with the Adlington family of Cheshire is unproven, as is his authorship of the 1579 verse tract "A Speciall Remedie against the furious force of Lawlesse Love", which is more likely to have been written by the London schoolmaster William Averell.
