= Samuel Petit =

French Huguenot pastor and scholar (1594-1653)

Samuel Petit (Latin: Petitus) (1594–1653) was a French Huguenot pastor, known as a classical scholar and orientalist.

== Life ==
Born in Saint-Ambroix, in Languedoc (now in Gard), the son of the pastor François Petit of Saint-Ambroix, and Noémi Ollivier, he studied oriental languages at Geneva from 1610 to 1612. He became professor of Greek at the Collège des Arts at Nîmes in 1615, and pastor there in the same year, a position he held for the rest of his life. He was principal at the Collège from 1627 to 1633.

== Works ==
- Miscellaneorum libri novem (1630). This work includes Petit's speculation on organising the dialogues of Plato into sets of four. It also included his attempted reconstruction of the Phoenician language.
- Eclogae chronologicae (1632)
- Variarum lectionum libri IV (1633); reprinted in Critici Sacri (1698 edition).
- Leges atticae (1635)
- Observationum libri III (1642)
- Diatribi de jure (1649)
- Traité concernant la réunion de Chrétiens (1670).

== Family ==
In 1620, Petit married Catherine Cheiron. Their surviving daughter Antoinette married the physician Pierre Formi.

Petit brought up his orphaned nephew Samuel de Sorbière, whose mother Louisa was his sister.
