= George Head =

Sir George Head (1782–1855) was an English commissariat officer and deputy Knight Marshal, also known for the publication 'A Home Tour through the Manufacturing Districts of England in the Summer of 1835', and other literary works.

== Biography ==
Head, elder brother of Sir Francis Bond Head, was born at the Hermitage in the parish of Higham, Kent, in 1782, but there is no entry of his baptism in the Higham parish register.

He was educated at the Charterhouse. In 1808 he became a captain in the West Kent Militia, then at Woodbridge, Suffolk, but in the following year joined the British Army at Lisbon as a clerk in the commissariat. He served during the remainder of the Peninsular War, following the army to the fields of Vitoria, Nivelle, and Toulouse, and the actions in the Pyrenees. He was promoted to deputy-assistant commissary-general in 1811, and assistant commissary-general on 25 December 1814. From May 1813 he was in charge of the commissariat of the 3rd division of the Spanish army under Sir Thomas Picton, concerning whom he has recorded many interesting particulars in the Memoirs of an Assistant Commissary-General.

Returning in August 1814, he was on the following 28 October ordered to proceed to Halifax, Nova Scotia; thence he went to Quebec, and was afterward employed on Lake Huron. In ten months he came back to England, and after a year's holiday returned to Halifax, where he remained five years on the peace establishment. Subsequently, he served in Ireland, and in 1823 was placed on half-pay.

In 1829 he published his Canadian reminiscences under the title of Forest Scenery and Incidents in the Wilds of North America. At the coronation of William IV he acted as deputy knight-marshal, and for his services on that occasion was knighted on 12 October 1831. At a later period he became deputy Knight Marshal to Queen Victoria.

He gained considerable repute for two works entitled A Home Tour through the Manufacturing Districts of England in the Summer of 1835, and A Home Tour through various parts of the United Kingdom in 1837, with an Appendix, being Memoirs of an Assistant Commissary-General, both works being reprinted in one volume in 1840. In 1849 he published in three volumes Rome, a Tour of Many Days, and he afterwards translated The Metamorphoses of Apuleius, 1851, and Historical Memoirs of Cardinal B. Pacca, 1850, in two volumes. To the Quarterly Review he was a frequent contributor. He was a popular author, and had much of the graphic power of description possessed by his brother.

He died in Cockspur Street, Charing Cross, London, on 2 May 1855, unmarried. He is buried in Kensal Green Cemetery.

=== Works ===
- George Head (1829), Forest Scenes and Incidents, in the Wilds of North America: Being a Diary of a Winter's Route from Halifax to the Canadas.., J. Murray
- George Head (1836), A Home Tour Through the Manufacturing Districts of England, in the Summer of 1835, J. Murray
- George Head (1837), A home tour through various parts of the United Kingdom, a continuation of the 'Home tour through the manufacturing districts', also "Memoirs of an Assistant Commissary-General", J. Murray
- George Head (1849), Rome: A tour of many days, vol. 1, Longman, Brown, Green and Longmans
- George Head (1849), Rome: A tour of many days, vol. 2, Longman, Brown, Green and Longmans
- George Head (1849), Rome: A tour of many days, vol. 3, Longman, Brown, Green and Longmans
- George Head; Bartolomeo Pacca (1850), Historical Memoirs of Cardinal Pacca, Prime Minister to Pius VII, vol. 1, Longman, Brown, Green and Longmans
- George Head; Bartolomeo Pacca (1850), Historical Memoirs of Cardinal Pacca, Prime Minister to Pius VII, vol. 2, Longman, Brown, Green and Longmans
- Apuleius; George Head (translation) (1851), The metamorphoses of Apuleius : a romance of the second century, Longman, Brown, Green and Longmans
