= Nicholas Tacitus Zegers =

Nicholas Tacitus Zegers (c.1495 – 25 August 1559) was a Flemish Franciscan biblical exegete.

== Life ==
He was born either at Diest or Brussels during the latter half of the fifteenth century; After receiving an education at Leuven, he entered the Franciscan Order, joining the Province of Cologne; at the division for that province; he was assigned to the Low German Province.

Coming under the influence of Francis Titelmans, professor of exegesis in the convent of Leuven, he devoted himself to the study of Scriptures. He succeeded Titelmann in the chair of exegesis in 1536, which he held to 1548. After a period elsewhere, he returned to Leuven in 1558.

He died at Leuven, 25 August 1559.

== Works ==
In 1548 he gave up his chair to devote himself to writing. His foundation in Greek and Hebrew enabled him to exercise critical judgment on the explanation of passages of the Bible, a quality at that time quite rare. He opposed the reading of Erasmus on the Law of Christ from the Greek Testament. His commentary is mostly antiquarian. Nicolaus Mameranus writes of him:

Vir pietatis amans, semper studiosus honesti,
Et bona qui semper publica ubique juvat.

Besides many translations of ascetical works from Flemish (Dutch) and French into Latin, he also wrote:

- Proverbia Teutonica Latinitate Donata (Antwerp, 1550 and 1571)
- Scholion in omnes Novi Testamenti libros (Cologne, 1553)
- Epanorthotes, sive Castigationes Novi Testamenti (Cologne, 1555)
- Dye Collegie der Wysheit ghefundeert in dye universiteit der deughden (Antwerp, 1556)
- Inventorium in Testamentum Novum, a kind of concordance (Antwerp, 1558 and 1566)
- Novum Jesu Christi Testamentum juxta vetorem ecclesiae editionem (Leuven, 1559)
- a catechism in Flemish
