= Godfather Death =

German fairy tale

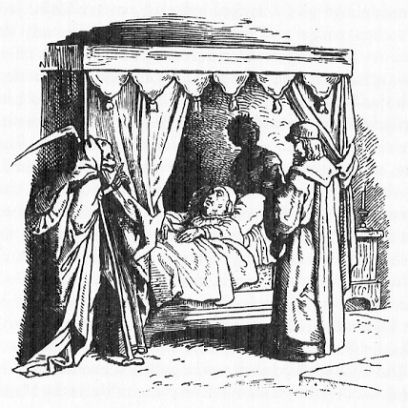

Folk tale
- Name: Godfather Death
- Also known as: Der Gevatter Tod
- Aarne–Thompson grouping: ATU 332
- Country: Germany
- Origin Date: 1812
- Published in: Grimms' Fairy Tales

"Godfather Death" (German: Der Gevatter Tod) is a German fairy tale collected by the Brothers Grimm and first published in 1812 (KHM 44). It is a tale of Aarne-Thompson type 332.

== Origin ==
The tale was published by the Brothers Grimm in the first edition of Kinder- und Hausmärchen in 1812, as tale no. 44.

== Synopsis ==
A poor man has twelve children and works hard to feed each of them every day. When his thirteenth and last child is born, the man decides to find a godfather for this child. He runs out into the highway and finds God walking there. God asks to be the godfather, promising the child health and happiness. The man, after finding out that the man is God, declines, saying that God condones poverty. Then the man meets the Devil (in later editions) on the highway. The Devil asks to be the godfather, offering the child gold and the world's joys. The man, after finding out that the man is the Devil, declines, saying that the Devil deceives mankind.

The man, still walking down the highway, meets Death. The man decides to make Death the child's godfather saying that Death takes away the rich and the poor, without discrimination. The next Sunday, Death becomes the child's godfather.

When the boy comes of age, Death appears to him and leads him into the woods, where special herbs grow. There, the boy is promised that Death will make him a famous physician. It is explained that whenever the boy visits an ill person, Death will appear next to the sick person. If Death stands at the person's head, that person is to be given the special herb found in the forest and cured. But if Death appears at the person's feet, any treatment on them would be useless as they would soon die.

The boy soon becomes famous, just as Death had foreseen, and receives plenty of gold for his amazing ability to see whether a person would live or die. Soon, the king of all the lands becomes ill and sends for the famous physician.

When the physician goes to see the king, he notices immediately that Death is standing at the foot of the bed. The physician feels pity for the king and decides to trick Death. The physician turns the king around in his bed so that Death stands over the head. He then gives the king the herb to eat. This heals the king and speeds his recovery.

Soon after, Death approaches the physician, expressing anger for tricking him and disobeying Death's rules. But because the physician is Death's godchild, he does not punish him. Death then warns the physician that if he was to ever trick Death again, he will take the physician's life.

Not much later, the king's daughter becomes ill and the physician goes to see her. The king promises his daughter's hand in marriage and the inheritance of the crown if the physician cures her. When the physician visits the princess, he sees Death at her feet. Ignoring this, he is captivated by the princess's beauty and thoughts of being her husband. The physician turns the princess around so that Death is at her head. He then feeds her the herb.

Just as the princess is coming around, Death grasps the physician by the arm and drags him to a cavern. In this cave are thousands of candles, each burned down to different lengths. Death explains that the length of each candle shows how much longer a person has to live. Death shows the physician his candle and it is very short, suggesting that the physician doesn't have much longer to live.

The physician pleads with his godfather to light him a new candle, so that he may live a happy life as king and husband to the beautiful princess. The physician walks to the candle of his child and tries to move it to his own.

Death says he cannot: in order for another to be lit, one has to go out. The physician begs that he takes out one candle and lights a new one. Death obeys. He walks towards the physician's candle and looks at it.

Just as he is about to light the new candle, Death lifts his scythe and the boy's candle goes out. As soon as the candle is extinguished, the physician falls dead to the ground.

=== Other versions ===
This story was included in the first edition of Kinder- und Hausmärchen, but the first edition version included a different ending. The first edition version ended at the part of Death showing the physician the candles. The second edition version of Kinder- und Hausmärchen included the part of Death pretending to light the candle and failing on purpose, killing the physician.

== Variants ==
The "Godfather Death" tale is similar to other AT-332 tales, such as the Austrian "Dr. Urssenbeck, Physician of Death", the Norwegian "The Boy with the Ale Keg", or the Italian "The Just Man". Scholarship suggests that a predecessor of the tale type is attested in an Icelandic manuscript from 1339, probably based on a yet unknown Latin source.

Emmanuel Le Roy Ladurie explores variants of "Godfather Death", from throughout Europe and North America and from the 14th to the 20th century, in the book Love, Death and Money in the Pays d'Oc (1980). He argues that the 18th-century Occitan novella Jean-l'ont-pris is a comic, "encoded" version of "Godfather Death".

It was the basis for the 19th-century Spanish stories Juan Holgado y la muerte (1850) by Cecilia Böhl de Faber, Death's Friend (1852) by Pedro Antonio de Alarcón and Traga-aldabas (1867) by Antonio de Trueba.

A Japanese traditional rakugo story "Shinigami" (established by the late 19th century) is actually based on Grimm's "Godfather Death".

An animated version of the story is depicted in the anime anthology Grimm's Fairy Tale Classics. In this version the ending is changed so that the physician ends up donating his candle to save a dying child.

== See also ==
- The Godfather
