= John Price (classical scholar) =

English classical scholar and publisher (c. 1602–1676)

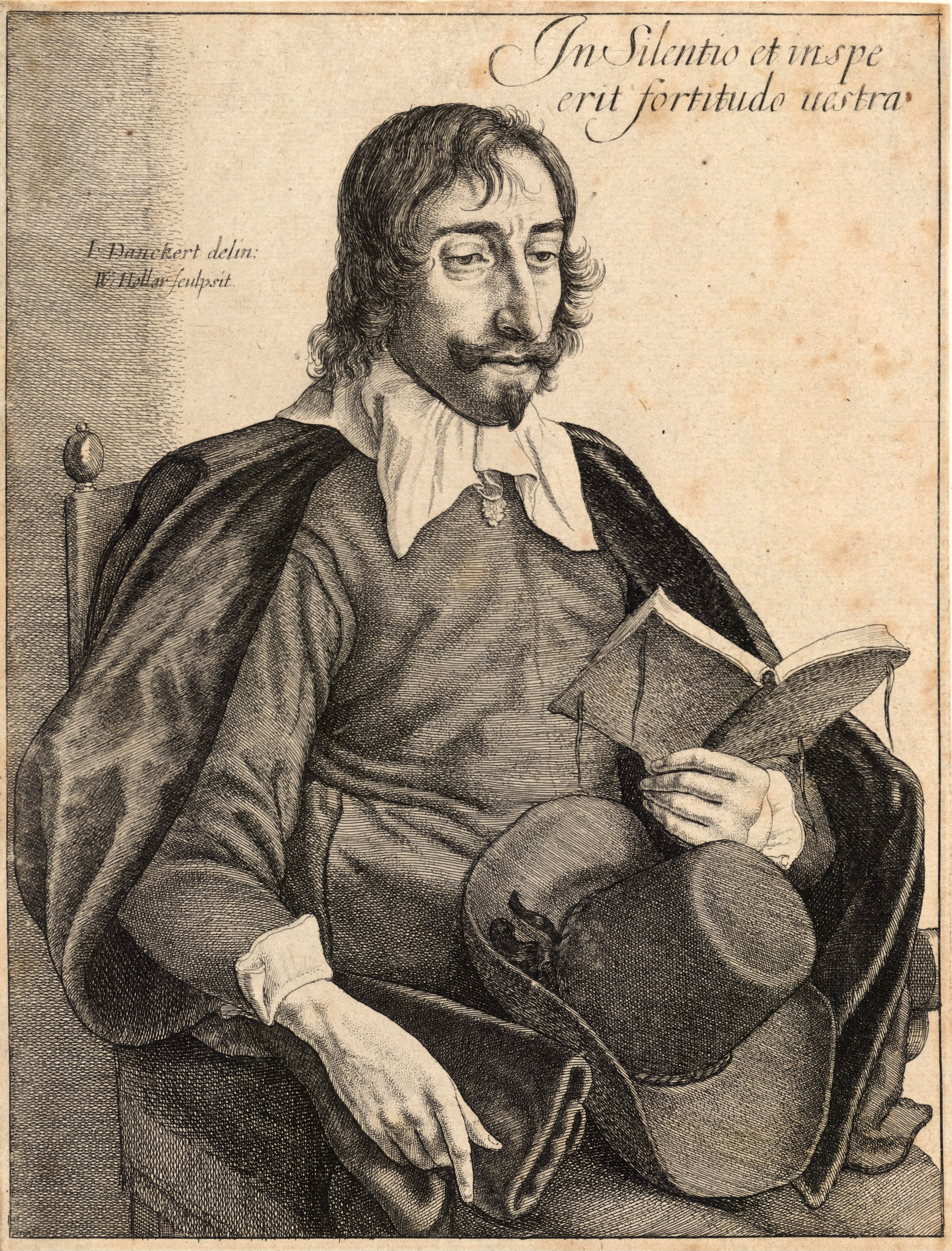
A contemporary engraving of John Price by Wenceslas Hollar

John Price (Pricaeus) (c. 1602–1676) was an English classical scholar, publisher and collector of books. He was a Roman Catholic who described himself as ‘Anglo-Britannus’.

In 1635, in Paris, he published the Apologia of Apuleius.

From 1652 the Medicis employed him as their "keeper of coins". He was also appointed professor of Greek at Pisa.

In 1661 he moved, under patronage of Cardinal Francesco Barberini, to Rome where he died in 1676.
