= Kenneth Silverman =

American biographer and educator (1936–2017)

Kenneth Eugene Silverman (February 5, 1936 – July 7, 2017) was an American biographer and educator. He won a Pulitzer Prize and a Bancroft Prize for his 1984 biography of Cotton Mather, The Life and Times of Cotton Mather. Silverman, who specialized in Colonial American literature, was a professor of English at New York University until his retirement in 2001.

== Biography ==
Silverman was born February 5, 1936, in Manhattan. He was educated at Stuyvesant High School and Columbia University, where he received B.A. (1956), M.A. (1958) and Ph.D. (1964) degrees in English.

Silverman was a fellow of the American Academy of Arts and Sciences. In addition to the Pulitzer and Bancroft Prizes, he won an Edgar Award of the Mystery Writers of America for his 1991 biography of Edgar Allan Poe and the Christopher Literary Award of the Society of American Magicians for his work on Harry Houdini.

Silverman died of lung cancer in Manhattan on July 7, 2017.

== Books ==
- As Editor, Colonial American Poetry (Hafner Publishing Company, 1968)
- Timothy Dwight (New York: Twayne, 1969)
- A Cultural History of the American Revolution (Thomas Y. Crowell Company, 1976) ISBN 978-0-375-40128-2.
- The Life and Times of Cotton Mather New York: Harper & Row, 1984. (1985 Pulitzer Prize for Biography or Autobiography, 1985 Bancroft Prize in American History) ISBN 978-1-56649-206-5, ISBN 1-56649-206-8.
- Edgar A. Poe: Mournful and Never-ending Remembrance (New York: HarperCollins, 1991) ISBN 0-06-016715-7.
- Houdini!!! The Career of Ehrich Weiss, American Self-Liberator, Europe's Eclipsing Sensation, World's Handcuff King and Prison Breaker - Nothing on Earth Can Hold Houdini a Prisoner!!! (1997) ISBN 0-06-092862-X
- Lightning Man: The Accursed Life of Samuel F.B. Morse (Alfred A. Knopf, 2003) ISBN 978-0-375-40128-2.
- Begin Again: A Biography of John Cage (Alfred A. Knopf, 2010), ISBN 978-1-4000-4437-5
