= Caspar Schwenckfeld =

16th-century German theologian

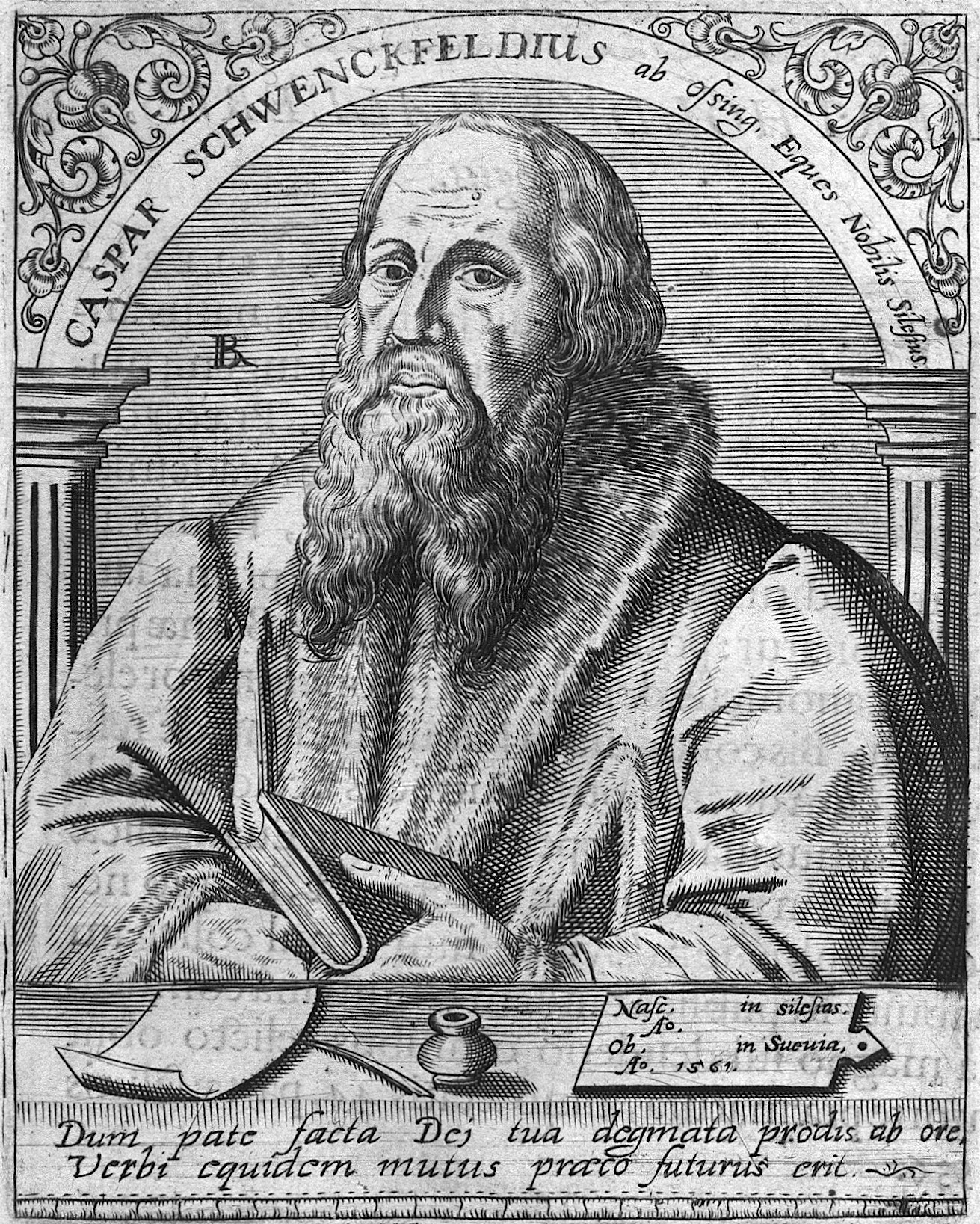
A 16th century illustration of Schwenkfeld

Caspar (or Kaspar) Schwenckfeld (or Schwenkfeld) von Ossig (1489 or 1490 – 10 December 1561) was a German court adviser, theologian, writer, and preacher who became a Protestant Reformer and spiritualist. He was one of the earliest promoters of the Protestant Reformation in Silesia.

Schwenckfeld came to Reformation principles through Thomas Müntzer and Andreas Karlstadt. However, he developed his own principles and fell out with Martin Luther over the eucharistic controversy (1524). He had his own views on the sacraments, known as the Heavenly Flesh doctrine, that were developed in close association with Valentin Crautwald, his humanist colleague. His followers became a new sect, which was outlawed in Germany. Its ideas were influenced by Anabaptism, in Europe, and Puritanism in England.

Many of his followers were persecuted in Europe and thus forced to either convert or flee. Because of this, there are Schwenkfelder Church congregations in the United States, which was then the Thirteen Colonies of British America until American independence was achieved following the American Revolutionary War.

== Early life and education ==
Schwenckfeld was born in Ossig in the Duchy of Legnica, Silesia, now Osiek, near Legnica, Poland, to noble parents in 1489. Between 1505 and 1507, he was a student in Cologne. In 1507, he enrolled at the University of Frankfurt on the Oder. Between 1511 and 1523, Schwenckfeld served the Duchy of Legnica as an adviser to Duke Charles I (1511–1515), Duke George I (1515–1518), and Duke Frederick II (1518–1523).

== Career ==
In 1518 or 1519, Schwenckfeld experienced an awakening that he called a "visitation of God". Martin Luther's writings had a deep influence on Schwenckfeld, and he embraced the "Lutheran" Reformation and became a student of the scriptures. In 1521, Schwenckfeld began to preach the gospel, and in 1522 won Duke Friedrich II over to Protestantism. He organized a brotherhood of his converts for the purpose of study and prayer in 1523. In 1525, he rejected Luther's idea of the real presence and came to a spiritual interpretation of the Lord's Supper, which was rejected by Luther.

Memorial plaque in Öpfingen

Schwenckfeld began to teach that the true believer ate the spiritual body of Christ. He pushed for reformation wherever he went, but also criticized reformers he thought went to extremes. He emphasized that for one to be a true Christian, one must not change only outwardly but inwardly. Because of communion and other controversies, Schwenckfeld broke with Luther and followed what some describe as a "middle way" between Catholicism and Lutheranism. Because of his break from Luther and the Magisterial Reformation, scholars typically categorize Schwenckfeld as a member of the Radical Reformation. He voluntarily exiled himself from Silesia in 1529 in order to relieve pressure on and embarrassment of his duke. He lived in Strasbourg from 1529 to 1534, and then in Swabia.

=== Teachings ===
Some of the teachings of Schwenckfeld included opposition to war, secret societies, and oath-taking, that the government had no right to command one's conscience, that regeneration is by grace through inner work of the Spirit, that believers feed on Christ spiritually, and that believers must give evidence of regeneration. He rejected infant baptism, outward church forms, and "denominations". His views on the Eucharist prompted Luther to publish several sermons on the subject in his 1526 The Sacrament of the Body and Blood of Christ—Against the Fanatics.

=== Publications ===
In 1541, Schwenckfeld published the Great Confession on the Glory of Christ. Many considered the writing to be heretical. He taught that Christ had two natures, divine and human, but that he became progressively more divine. He also published a number of works about interpreting the scriptures during the 1550s, often responding to the rebuttals of the Lutheran Reformer Matthias Flacius Illyricus.

Schwenckfeld's Theriotropheum Silesiae is considered the world's oldest published local faunal list, containing a list of the animals of Silesia, including 150 bird species.

== Disambiguation ==
In 16th-century Silesia, two notable individuals named Caspar Schwenckfeld made their mark. Caspar Schwenckfeld von Ossig (1489/90–1561) was a nobleman, court adviser, and self-taught theologian who played a key role in the Protestant Reformation in Silesia before going into exile in southwestern Germany. He authored many theological works, including The Great Confession of 1541. The other Caspar Schwenckfeld (1563–1609) was a physician and naturalist from Hirschberg (today, Jelenia Góra, Poland), best known for his study of local plants and animals, Theriotropheum Silesiae (1603).

=== Death ===
In 1561, Schwenckfeld became sick with dysentery, and gradually grew weaker until he died in Ulm on the morning of December 10, 1561. Due to his enemies, the fact of his death and the place of his burial were kept secret.

== Schwenkfelder Church ==
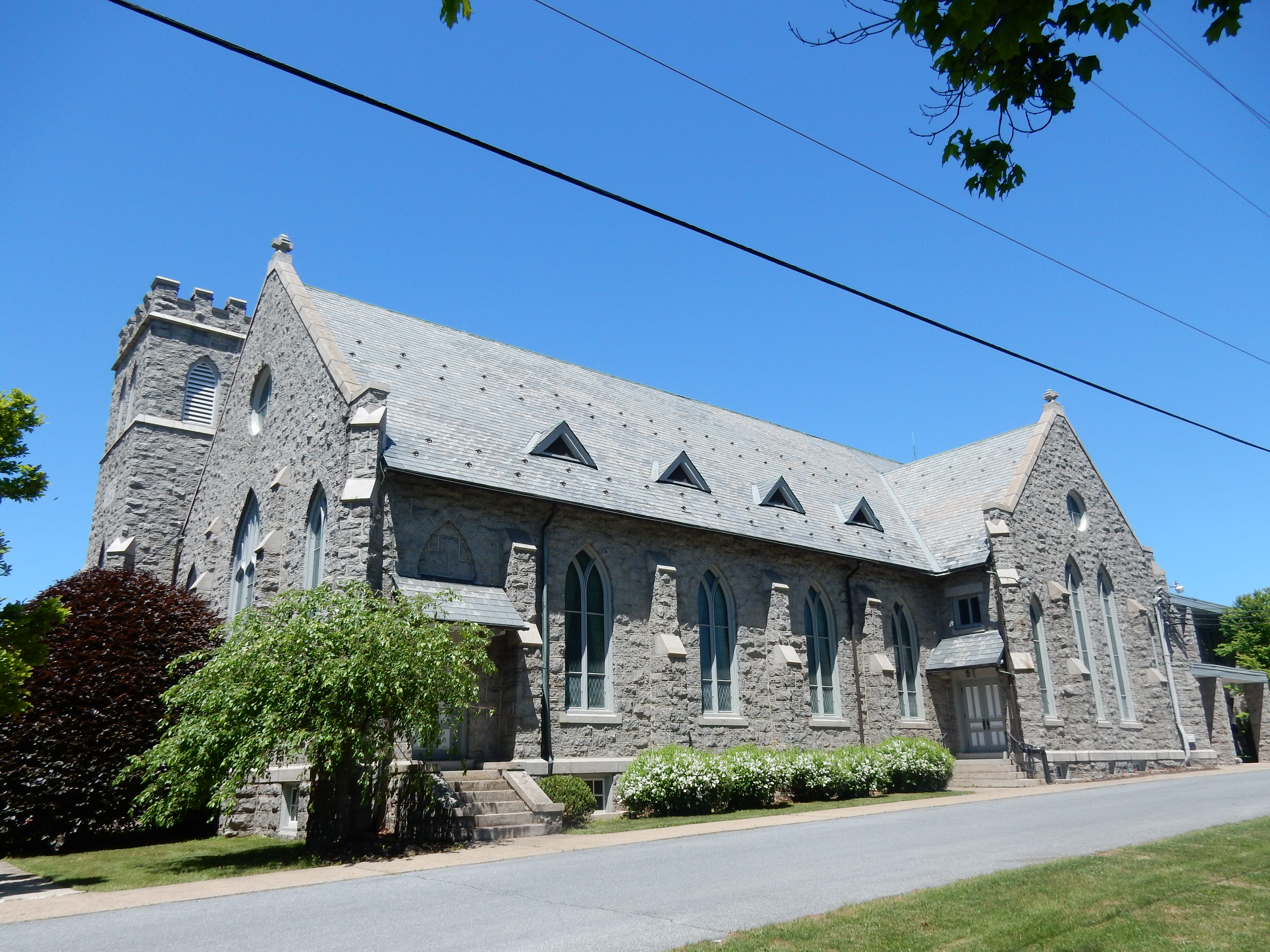
Schwenkfelder Church in Palm, Pennsylvania

Schwenckfeld did not organize a separate church during his lifetime, but followers seemed to gather around his writings and sermons. In 1700, there were about 1,500 of them in Lower Silesia. Many fled Lower Silesia under persecution of the Austrian emperor, and some found refuge on the lands of Count Nicolaus Ludwig Zinzendorf and his Herrnhuter Brüdergemeine. These followers became known as Schwenkfelders. A single Schwenkfelder, George Scholtz, arrived in Philadelphia in 1731. His trip was followed by five more migrations up to 1737. In 1782, the Society of Schwenkfelders was formed, and in 1909 the Schwenkfelder Church was organized.

Schwenkfelder Church has remained small with approximately 2,695 total members as of 2010, and four churches, including Schwenkfelder Missionary Church in Philadelphia. Each of its the existing churches are within a 50 mi (80 km) radius of Philadelphia.

== Schwenkfelder Library & Heritage Center ==
Schwenkfelder Library & Heritage Center is a small museum, library and archives in Pennsburg, Pennsylvania. It is the only institution dedicated to the preservation and interpretation of the history of the Schwenkfelders, including Schwenckfeld, the Radical Reformation, religious toleration, Schwenkfelders in Europe and America, and the Schwenkfelder Church. The Schwenkfelder Library & Heritage Center hosts exhibits and programs throughout the year.
