= Abecedarian =

16th-century German sect of Anabaptists

Abecedarians were a 16th-century German sect of Anabaptists who rejected all human learning. Questions have been raised as to the historical accuracy of the name and sect, though the term was applied broadly to the Zwickau Prophets.

== Rejection of education ==
The Abecedarians were a 16th-century German sect of Anabaptists who affected an absolute disdain for all human knowledge, contending that God would enlighten his elect from within themselves, giving them knowledge of necessary truths by visions and ecstasies, with which human learning would interfere.

They rejected every other means of instruction, and claimed that to be saved one must even be ignorant of the first letters of the alphabet; whence their name, A-B-C-darians. They also considered the study of theology as a species of idolatry, and regarded learned men who did any preaching as falsifiers of God's word.

Nicholas Storch led this sect, preaching that the teaching of the Holy Spirit was all that was necessary. Andreas Karlstadt adopted these views, abandoned his title of doctor and became a street porter, going so far as to burn his doctor's gown, according to one source.

Storch (also spelled Stork), a follower of Luther, "maintained that each individual among the faithful was equally qualified to penetrate the sense of the inspired writings, as the best divines; that God himself was our immediate instructor, and that study took off our attention to the divine inspirations. Hence he inferred, that the only method to prevent distractions would be, absolutely not to learn to read." Bell also claims that the sect was considerable for some time in Germany.

John Henry Blunt, an Anglican priest, claimed in his Dictionary of Sects and Heresies (1874) that "Abecedarian theory, in a more moderate form, has had much influence on some modern sects, especially the more ignorant sects of Methodists."

== Cultural references ==
- In The Adventures of Tintin graphic novel The Calculus Affair, Captain Haddock uses the word "Abecedarian" as an epithet.
- Los Angeles post-punk band Abecedarians named themselves after the sect. They released three albums between 1986 and 1988.
- Don DeLillo references Abecedarians in his novel The Names.

== See also ==
- Chandrakirti, a Buddhist scholar who argued that the Buddha ceased all mental functions upon attaining nirvana
