= Against the Heavenly Prophets =

Against the Heavenly Prophets in the Matter of Images and Sacraments (in German: Wider den himmlischen Propheten von den Bildern und Sakrament, 1525) is Protestant Reformer Martin Luther's book against Andreas Karlstadt's spiritualism.

The book argues for example against iconoclasm and against so called religious enthusiasm or fanaticism.

== Original German text ==
- WA 18: 37–125

== See also ==
- Zwickau prophets
