= Body and Blood of Christ =

Body and Blood of Christ may refer to:

- The Body and Blood of Christ
- Eucharist, a Christian rite considered a sacrament in most churches and an ordinance in others

== See also ==
- The Sacrament of the Body and Blood of Christ—Against the Fanatics, a 1526 book by Martin Lutther
