= The Sacrament of the Body and Blood of Christ—Against the Fanatics =

1526 book by Martin Luther

The Sacrament of the Body and Blood of Christ–Against the Fanatics
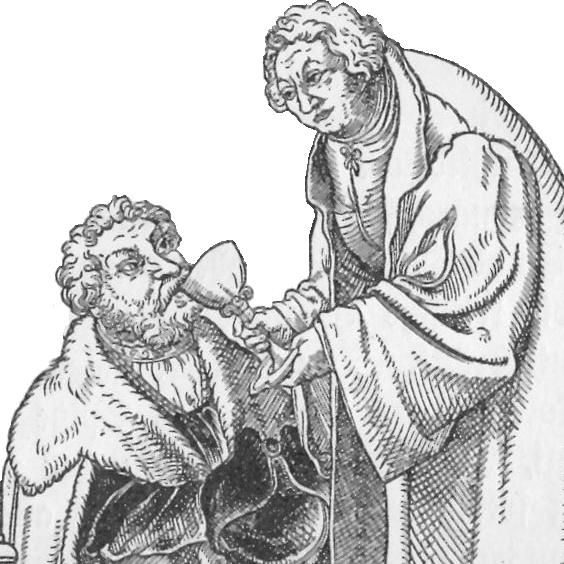
- Luther communing John the Steadfast
- Author: Martin Luther
- Original title: Sakrament des Leibes and Blutes Christi wider die Schwarmgeister
- Translator: Frederick C. Ahrens
- Language: German
- Genre: Philosophy, Theology
- Publication date: Late September or Early October 1526
- English publication date: 1955
- Preceded by: Various Sacramentarian writings of Karlstadt, Krautwald, Schwenkfeld, Bucer, Zwingli, and Oecolampadius
- Followed by: Friendly Rejoinder and Rebuttal to the Sermon of the Eminent Martin Luther against the Fanatics by Zwingli

The Sacrament of the Body and Blood of Christ—Against the Fanatics is a book by Martin Luther, published in late September or early October 1526 to aid Germans confused by the spread of new ideas from the Sacramentarians. At issue was whether Christ's true body and blood were present in the Lord's Supper, a doctrine that came to be known as the sacramental union.

== Historical background ==
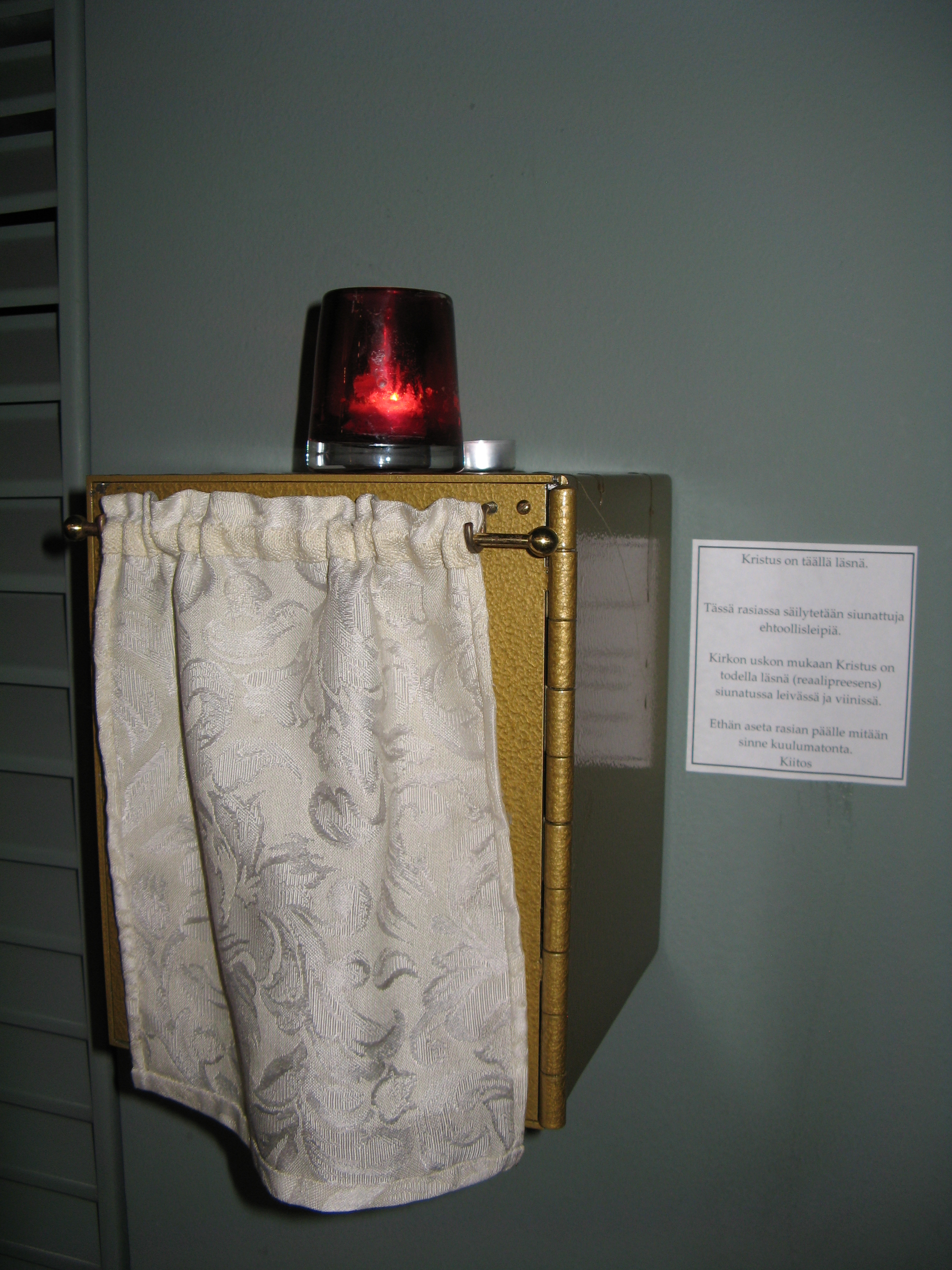
A note about the real presence in Mikael Agricola Church, Helsinki.

The real presence of Christ's true body and blood in the Lord's Supper was a controversial issue at the time of Luther. The Sacramentarians Andreas Karlstadt, Valentin Krautwald, Caspar Schwenckfeld, Huldrych Zwingli, and Johannes Oecolampadius were open combatants against Luther on this topic. Martin Bucer, while translating Johannes Bugenhagen's commentary on the Psalms, fraudulently replaced Bugenhagen's statements on the Lord's Supper with commentary aligning with Zwingli's views. Since this work included forewords from both Luther and Philipp Melanchthon, it gave the appearance that the Wittenberg faculty agreed with Zwingli. Later, Bucer, in the middle of translating Luther's sermons for publication, inserted his own comments rebutting Luther's teaching on the sacrament into the published book. Inspired by Bucer's tactics, Leo Jud put forth an essay in Zürich claiming that Luther agreed with the Swiss understanding of the Lord's Supper.

As a result of all these adversaries, Luther found it necessary to respond to them. However, he was both too busy to produce a new work and did not want to. Luther judged his opponents weak and felt he would have time to oppose them later. Instead of writing a new essay, he sent three sermons that he had preached the preceding March to a printer. The first one, dealing with the Lord's Supper, was from the Wednesday of Holy Week. One each of the second two from Maundy Thursday dealt with the Lord's Supper and Confession. After editing them and apparently adding extra material without Luther's involvement, the printer published them sometime in late September or early October 1526 under the name The Sacrament of the Body and Blood of Christ–Against the Fanatics. Today, scholars have been able to compare this printed text with two records of notes taken down while Luther actually preached the original sermons.

== Summary ==
=== Part I: Biblical teaching of the Sacrament ===
The Sacrament of the Body and Blood of Christ opens with a two part exposition of the Christian faith as applied to the Lord's Supper. First, one must consider the object of faith, "what one should believe". Then, one may consider how one may make use of this object, which in this case refers to how one should use the sacrament. A large portion of this opening section is devoted to logical refutations of logical arguments built up by Zwingli and those who agreed with him. These rational arguments are not intended to persuade his opponents, who in Luther's view do not accept God's Word and therefore may believe as they please apart from the church, but instead to help the "reasonable souls" who are still willing to "concern themselves" with God's Word.

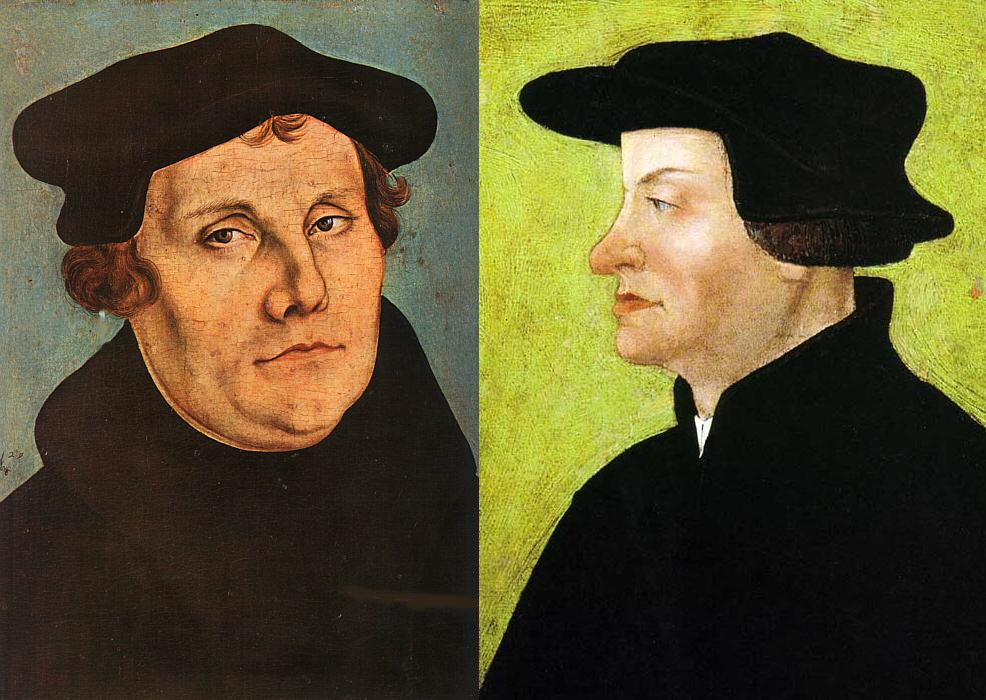
Martin Luther (left) and Huldrych Zwingli (right) disagreed about the real presence of Christ's true body and blood.

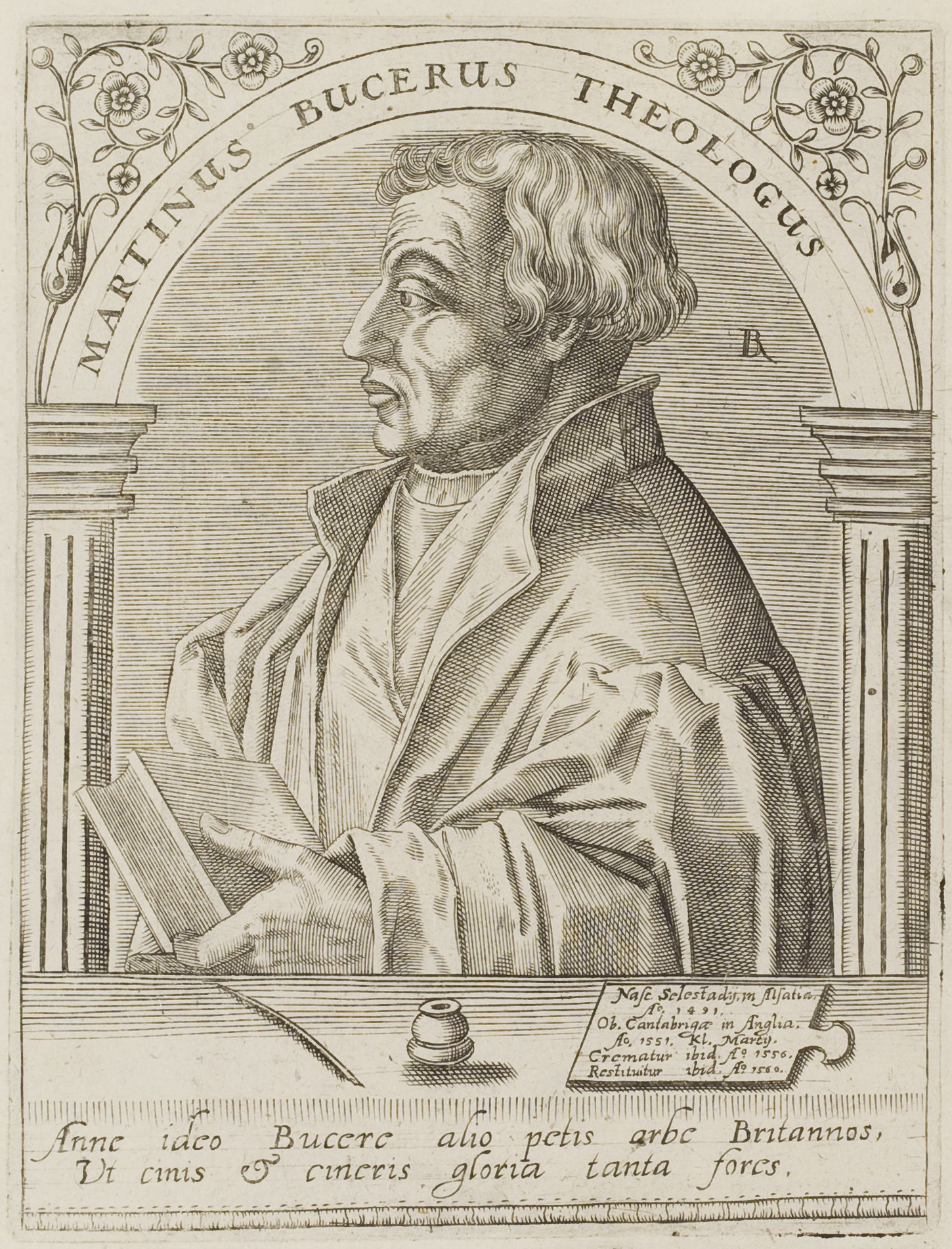
Martin Bucer

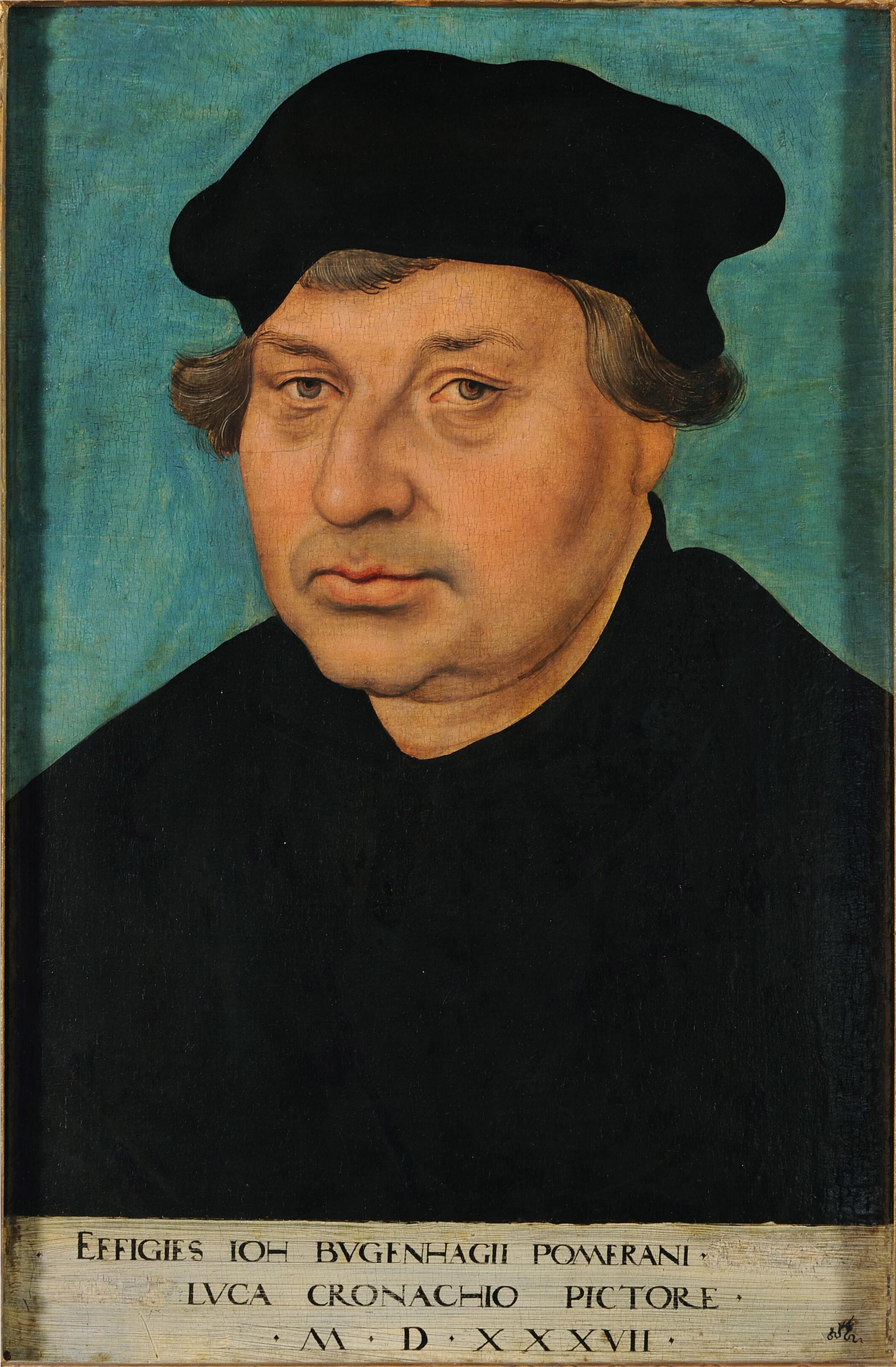
Bugenhagen in 1537 by Lucas Cranach

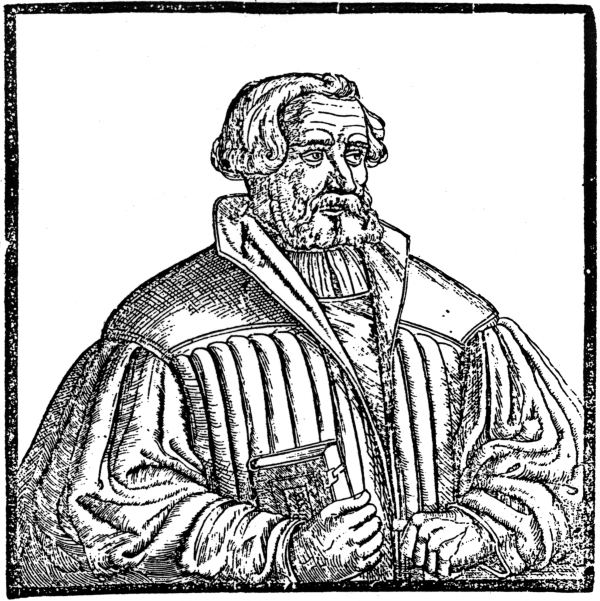
Andreas Bodenstein von Karlstadt, portrait 1541/42

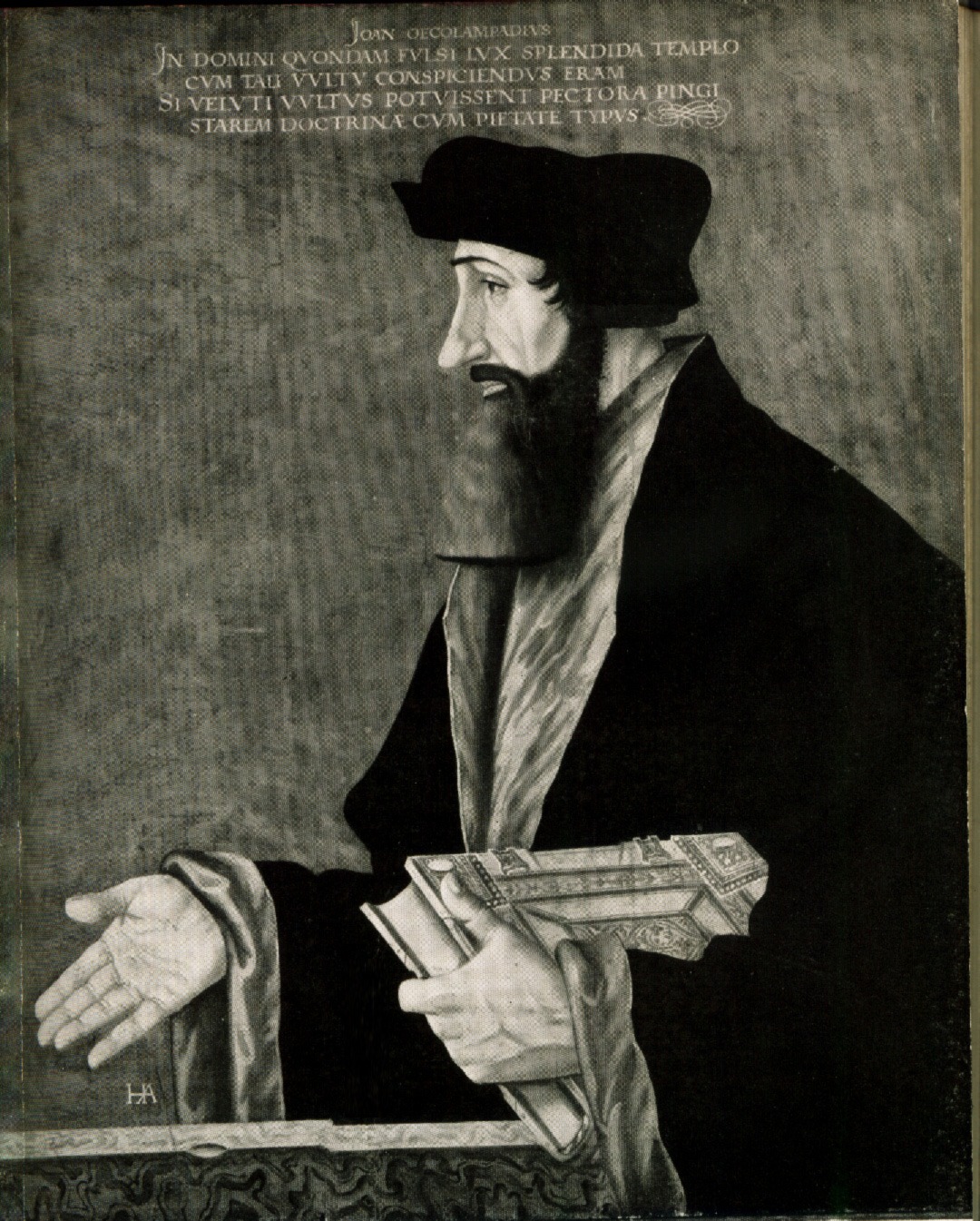
Johannes Oecolampadius

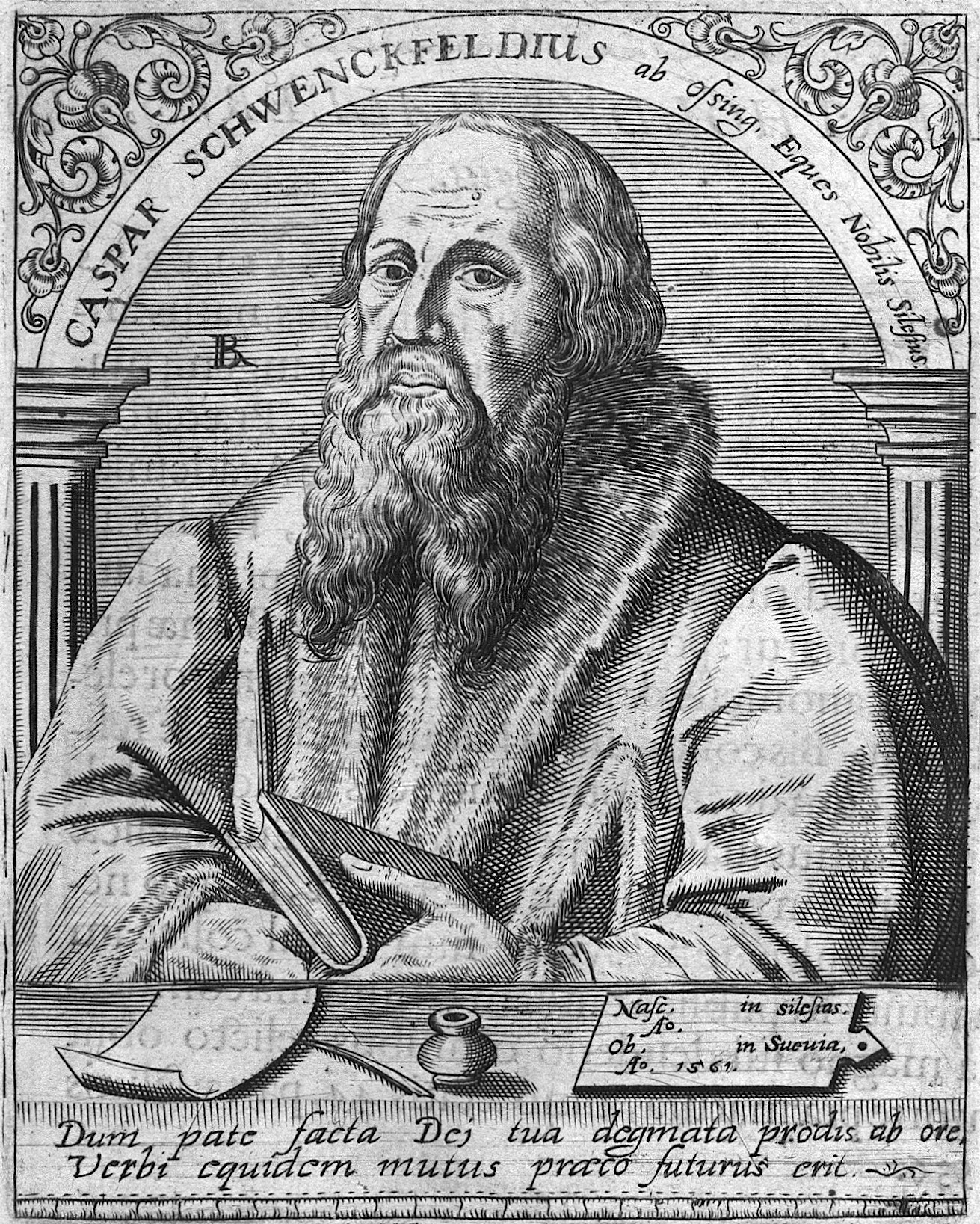
Caspar Schwenckfeld

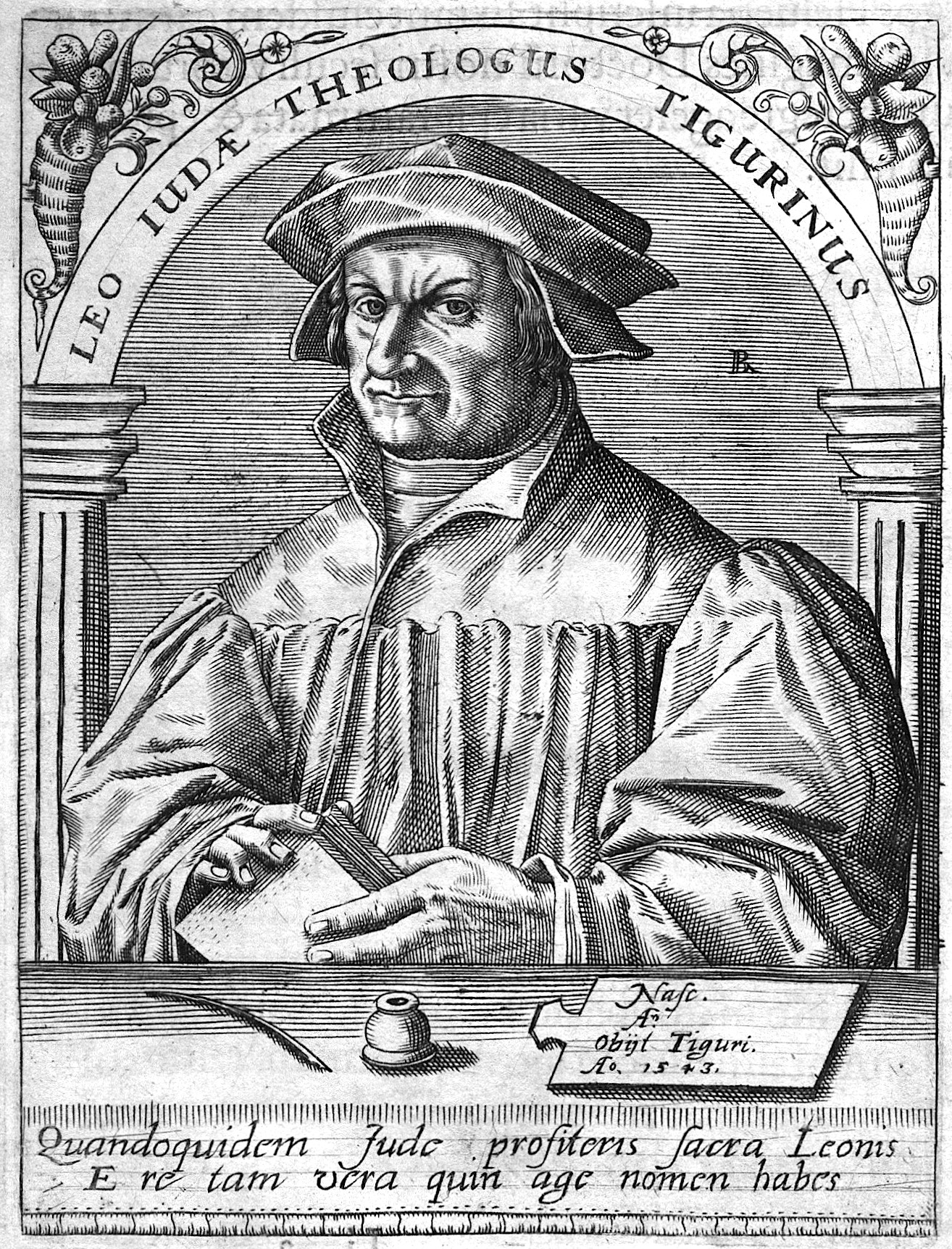
Prior to this exchange of publications between Luther and Zwingli, Leo Jud, pictured above, argued that Luther held to the view of Zwingli.

What one must believe is explained by "the clear text and the plain words of Christ" in the Words of Institution. Whoever does not believe these words has fallen into a mind trick devised by the devil and has a perspective distorted by "colored glass". The word "is" means "is" in the literal way that one uses for common speaking at the dinner table. Christ distributes his body and blood in the sacrament in a way similar to how he distributes himself across the entire world.

To those who claim that there must be a location for Christ's body to be present under the bread, Luther responds that the soul is also illocal, yet is still really present throughout the body. Lest anyone think that the real presence is too great a miracle to be present in all the churches all the time, Luther cites the sprouting of seeds and the power of words to persuade as common, great, proliferating miracles. When objectors cite the incompatibility of non-living objects with Christ, Luther reminds them that the presence of Christ in the hearts of faithful is an even a greater miracle. Against the lack of an entry site for Christ's body to enter the bread, Luther notes that the Christ entered into the Virgin Mary solely through the power of the Word, without any noticeable physical entry.

Luther noticed an inherent danger in his appeal to Christ's ubiquity to assert his real presence. If Christ is in all things, then perhaps he can be found in all things, similar to pantheism. Luther prevents pantheism from joining the discussion table by limiting the search for Christ to what God's Word alone has authorized. Any searching for Christ apart from the Word is idolatry.

=== Part II: Use of the Sacrament ===
This second of the three sermons is less controversial than the first. In it, Luther rejects the papal use of the sacraments as good works that humans could perform to merit salvation or as a means of raising money. Although he rejects the symbolical interpretation of the Lord's Supper, he advocates that the sacrament be conducted along with general preaching and proclamation in the lives of ordinary Christians. In this way, Christians would be blessed so that "their number may increase".

Part of this proclamation consisted in resistance to the demands of the Pope. By rejecting the Pope's commands regarding the sacrament, they bore witness to the Gospel, showing that the believer, in Christ, was "free from death, devil, and hell…a son of God, a lord of heaven and earth". The Lord's Supper is a possession of ordinary Christians that gives the great comfort to those individually given the assurance of salvation. Through the sacrament Christians may "strengthen [their] faith and make [their] consciences secure". But this building up in the faith was not an end in itself. Instead, it in turn led to the proclamation of the Gospel by all the Christians edified through it.

==== Two Principles of Christian Doctrine ====
Faith and love, states Luther, are the two principles of Christian doctrine. Justification through faith is taught by the Word. In God's Word, it is easy to see Christ's work on the cross, which was a single payment for sin that lasts for all eternity. In contrast to this faith in Christ, which is formed at once from the word, the second principle of Christian doctrine can be learned for an entire lifetime without completely mastering it. This second principle is love, or sanctification in the narrow sense. From Christ's sacrifice proclaimed in the Lord's Supper, Christians learn the ultimate expression of love.

Another aspect of this second principle is the proclamation of communion within the church. Both the individual grains and the individual grapes lose their identity to become one in the products of bread and wine. They mystically reflect the gathering together of Christians as one in the church. Indeed, this application is so rich in meaning that, along with faith, love, and patience, it provides so much for a Christian to strive for that there is no need to indulge in obscure studies to prove academic greatness. Love is greater than knowledge and is above petty academic competition. Instead of lending superiority to a select few, this sacrament teaches a lesson that can be learned during one's entire life without ever finishing it.

=== Part III: Concerning Confession ===
Luther distinguishes between three kinds of confession in this last of the three sermons that make up this book. The first is confession before God, the second is confession before one's neighbor, and the third is private confession with one's priest. Before the Reformation, the devil confused people about confession by making it a burden and a requirement instead of a gift and opportunity. The purpose of these distinctions is to do away with the confusion that existed when confession was placed as a burden upon the people. Confession is useful in drawing attention to the social responsibilities Christians have toward their fellow brothers in need.

Private confession is not to be eliminated, because it retained its value through the giving of individual comfort to troubled souls and the providing of an opportunity for spiritual growth. Confession afforded an opportunity both to teach otherwise ignorant laypeople the right path to follow and for them to seek advice when they desired it. However, it was not obligatory for those who already confessed their sins before God and were reconciled with their neighbor. Private confession, instead of being instituted by God as a requirement in the Bible, was only historically derived from the other two forms of confession. These two forms of confession alone sufficed as a means for the forgiveness of sins without private confession.

== Response by Zwingli ==
Zwingli responded by writing the Friendly Rejoinder and Rebuttal to the Sermon of the Eminent Martin Luther against the Fanatics. In his Friendly Exposition, written at the same time, Zwingli found The Sacrament of the Body and Blood of Christ to be "forgettable". Between these two works, Zwingli concluded that he had destroyed Luther's singular authority and replaced Luther's view on the Sacrament of the Altar with the correct one. Zwingli wrote that he was not placing reason over the Scriptures, but instead properly distinguishing between the human and divine natures of Christ. Since Christ's human nature could not participate in the omnipresent attribute of the divine nature, his body and blood could not be truly present in the bread and wine. Luther's characterization of him as placing reason over Scripture was therefore a straw-man argument.

Luther's custom of referring to those who opposed him in non-Christian terms in The Sacrament of the Body and Blood of Christ sounds unusual to modern ears and therefore merits discussion. However strange-sounding today, this practice was consistent with what Lutherans at this early stage in the Reformation believed about the Reformation and the church. From 1520 and continuing through 1529, evangelicals thought the Reformation would unite rather than divide the church. Jews and misled Christians under Rome would convert to the true faith, while everyone else was a false Christian.

In Zwingli's view, Luther was only a Christian as any other and his talents as a theologian did not give him the right to make tyrannical judgments, for example, terming him a heretic, fanatic, and sacramentarian. Zwingli also rejected Luther's claim that the Swiss Reformers relied upon him in their preaching about Christ's death, claiming instead to follow Augustine and Erasmus. Although he admitted that Luther began the Reformation, he claimed that Luther was actually further behind him in the work of reforming. He considered Luther unscholarly and demanded that he retract his published views on the Lord's Supper going back to 1519. Instead of condemning Luther, Zwingli found him in need of brotherly prayer.

== Result ==
Historically, both this work by Luther and the responses by Zwingli resulted in an impasse. Instead of resolving their differences, both sides became more firmly entrenched into their positions.
