= Zwickau prophets =

Saxon Radical Reformers active in 1522

The Zwickau prophets (German: Zwickauer Propheten, Zwickauer Storchianer) were three men of the Radical Reformation from Zwickau in the Electorate of Saxony in the Holy Roman Empire who were possibly involved in a disturbance in nearby Wittenberg and its evolving Reformation in early 1522. The prophets, as well as supporters of their beliefs, were also referred to as Abecedarians, a name supposedly referring to the fact that they believed it was preferable to never learn the letters of the alphabet, as worldly knowledge prevented spiritual enlightenment.

The three men – Nikolaus Storch, Thomas Dreschel, and Markus Stübner – began their movement in Zwickau. Though these three names are favored in recent scholarship, others have been suggested. Lars Pederson Qualben used the name "Marx" for "Dreschel", and Henry Clay Vedder replaced Dreschel with Marcus Thomä (William Roscoe Estep gave Stübner the middle name "Thomas".).

The relationship of the Zwickau Prophets to the Anabaptist movement has been variously interpreted. They have been viewed as a precursory foundation of Anabaptism before the rise of the Swiss Brethren in 1525, as unrelated to the movement except for the influence on Thomas Müntzer and as being a dual foundation with the Swiss Brethren to form a composite movement of Anabaptism. Regardless of the exact relationship to Anabaptism, the Zwickau Prophets presented a radical alternative to Martin Luther and mainstream Protestantism as demonstrated in their involvement in disturbances in Wittenberg. They would go on to influence Andreas Carlstadt, a radical contemporary of Luther, as well as certain sects of Methodists.

== Theology ==
Perhaps the most distinctive feature of the Zwickau Prophets was their spiritualism, which was that direct revelations from the Holy Spirit, not Scripture, were their authority in theological matters. Another highly distinctive feature was their opposition to infant baptism, but the Zwickau Prophets do not seem to have departed from theory to have taken the turn to practicing adult baptism of believers that would mark Anabaptism.

The Zwickau Prophets also held to imminent apocalypticism, which led them to believe that the end of days would come soon. They also possibly sought a Believers' Church, which would be separate from the state churches of Protestantism and Catholicism.

The Zwickau prophets were influenced by the Waldensians and the Taborites.

== Wittenberg ==
The trio, having been exiled from Zwickau, arrived in Wittenberg on December 27, 1521. The men and their ideas had gained favor among Andreas Karlstadt and others who sought greater reforms in the city. Despite their acceptance among some, the Prophets' presence may have caused an unrest in the city that Philipp Melanchthon was unable to settle. Melanchthon turned to Martin Luther, who was at that time being held in protective custody at the Wartburg Castle, and at the behest of the Wittenberg town council, Luther returned to his reforming activities in Wittenberg on March 6, 1522.

Luther soon preached eight sermons against those he would label Schwärmer ("Fanatics") and the force of these sermons was enough to calm the growing radicalism in the city. The Prophets then reportedly confronted Luther in order to assert the authority of the Spirit-mediated message over Luther and his gospel. Luther claimed to have demanded that they authenticate their message with a miracle, a sign which the men refused to give. The Prophets then denounced Luther and left Wittenberg.

== Müntzer ==
Thomas Müntzer held two posts as preacher in Zwickau in 1520/21 and had contact with the Zwickau Prophets. While Müntzer may have associated himself for a time with them and held similar views to them in several areas of doctrine, this is not the same as Müntzer being a part of their group. As Vedder explained it, Müntzer was "with" the Prophets, but not "of" them. Some historians, however, have asserted that instead of the Zwickau Prophets and Müntzer being parallel with a mutual influence, Müntzer used the Prophets for his revolutionary ends.

== New explanation ==
While the above narrative of the events of Wittenberg in early 1522 and the association of the Zwickau Prophets with them had become the standard textbook explanation of the case, Olaf Kuhr has proposed a new explanation for understanding the occasion. Referring to primary sources, such as correspondences, Kuhr concludes that Dreschel and Storch left Wittenberg before January 1 and Stübner by January 6. With the former pair in Wittenberg for no more than four days and the latter for no more than ten, Kuhr questioned how great of an impact the Prophets could have had and if they were the source of the Wittenberg disturbances. Their absence would explain Qualben's observation (noting that is named by Kuhr as holding to the older historiography) that Luther made no personal references to the Prophets in the eight sermons preached upon his return.

Kuhr also challenged the older explanation on the confrontation that the Prophets had with Luther. Kuhr concluded that the Prophets did not come to Luther as a group but had each approached Luther at various times in the following year during separate visits to Wittenberg. Luther's account of the encounters, though appearing singular may have been a conflation of separate meetings, each meeting being similar enough for Luther to describe as one.
