= Valentin Krautwald =

German religious reformer

Valentin Krautwald (Latin: Cratoaldus; 1465–1545) was a German religious reformer, lector of theology at Liegnitz, and colleague of Caspar Schwenckfeld.

== Life ==
Born into a burger family of Neisse (now Nysa, Poland), he was supported in his higher education by Johann Thurzó. He was for several years in Kraków. On his return with a doctorate, the bishop made him a canon in Neisse and appointed him notary in his office.

Thurzo had sympathy with the reforming views of Martin Luther, and Krautwald took a leading role in a small early evangelical congregation, around Breslau. At this point Jan Hess was still hesitant about reform, though in contact with Luther and Philip Melanchthon. Via correspondence with Wittenberg, the Protestant-minded Frederick II of Legnica called Krautwald in 1523 to become Lector of theology and canon of the collegiate church in Liegnitz. There Krautwald came into close contact with Caspar Schwenckfeld, personally but also as a scholar and theologian.

In particular Krautwald influenced Schwenckfeld's doctrine of the Eucharist. It was unacceptable to Luther, who attacked Krautwald in a pamphlet of 1526. The controversy drew in the Breslau bishop Jakob von Salza, without a resolution in sight. Schwenckfeld chose voluntary exile in 1529; but Krautwald was left isolated in an unsatisfactory position. He died in Liegnitz in 1545.

== Selected works ==
- Descripcio vite pii patris Arnesti, Pragensis ecclesie archiepiscopi primi, per Valentinum Crautvaldum, 1516.
- Collatio et consensus verborum coenae Dominicae, de corpore et sanguine Christi, Strasbourg 1529
- Annotata in tria priora capita Geneseos, 1530
- De Oratione Fidei Epistola, 1530
- De coena dominica et verbis coenae epistolae duae, Strasbourg ca. 1530
- Kurze gründtliche Bewerung: Das Christus gantz der ware natürliche Sun Gottes, unnd nicht ain Geschöpff oder Creatur sei, 1538
- Von der Widergeburt und Herkummen eines Christen Menschens - gründtliche außlegung des spruchs Christi Johannis am dritten Cap; Was auch das für ein wasser sey, darauß die kinder Gottes (von oben herab) geboren werden. Augsburg 1538
- Ad Quaestiones D. Bonifacii Lycosthenis ... de vera ministioram electione ... epistola paraenetica, Strasbourg 1538
- Novus homo, 1545
- Novus homo hoc est quo, quamque mirabili semine internus sive, Francofvrti, apvd Iacobvm de Zetter, 1620
- Der new Mensch, Augspurg Verlag Ulhart, 1543
- Der Schwermer, Strasbourg 1544
- De veteris depravati, novi item hominis conditione, 1545
- Von den Wercken Christi, Ulm, c. 1546
