= Thomas Müntzer =

German preacher and theologian (c. 1489 – 1525)

Pastor Thomas Müntzer
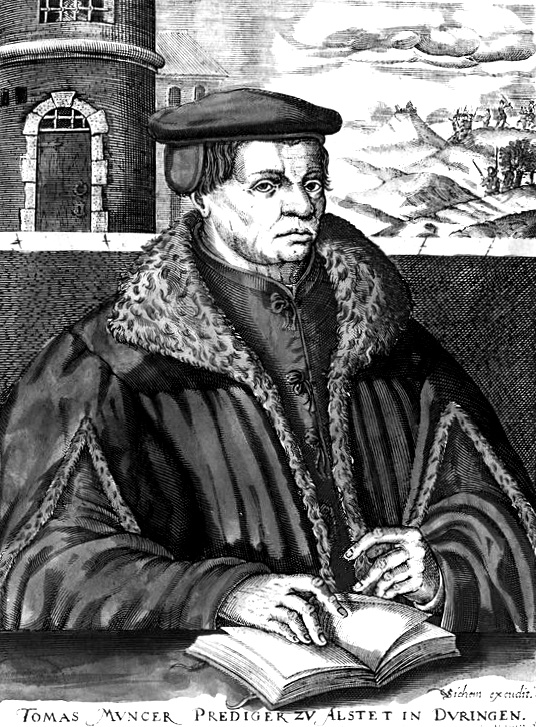
- Müntzer, imagined in a 1608 engraving by Christoffel van Sichem (Note: No contemporary portrait of the reformer exists. This engraving may have been a copy of a picture made by Hans Holbein the Younger in Basel, but all evidence suggests that Holbein had left for France before Müntzer came to Basel in late 1524. Another possibility is that the original portrait was made by Sebald Beham, one of the 'three godless painters' of Nuremberg, when Müntzer was in that city in late 1524.)
- Born: c. 1489; Stolberg, County of Stolberg, Holy Roman Empire
- Died: 27 May 1525 (aged about 35); Free Imperial City of Mühlhausen, Holy Roman Empire
- Education: Leipzig University; Viadrina University
- Occupations: Radical Reformation preacher, theologian, early Reformer

Signature
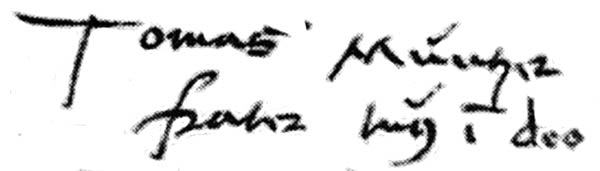

Thomas Müntzer (Note: /ˈmʊntzər/; German: [ˈtoːmas ˈmʏnt͡sɐ̯]) (c. 1489 – 27 May 1525) was a German preacher and theologian of the early Reformation whose opposition to both Martin Luther and the Catholic Church led to his open defiance of late-feudal authority in central Germany. Müntzer was foremost amongst those reformers who took issue with Luther's compromises with feudal authority. He was a leader of the German peasant and plebeian uprising of 1525 commonly known as the German Peasants' War.

In 1514, Müntzer became a Catholic priest in Brunswick, where he began to question the teachings and practices of the Catholic Church. He then became a follower and acquaintance of Martin Luther, who recommended him for a post in Zwickau. His beliefs became increasingly spiritual and apocalyptic; by his arrival at Allstedt in 1523 he had completely broken with Luther. Amidst the peasant uprisings in 1525, Müntzer organized an armed militia in Mühlhausen. He was captured after the Battle of Frankenhausen, tortured and finally executed.

Few other figures of the German Reformation raised as much controversy as Müntzer, which continues to this day. A complex and unusual character, he is now regarded as a significant personality in the early years of the German Reformation and the history of European revolutionaries. Almost all modern studies stress the necessity of understanding his revolutionary actions as a consequence of his theology: Müntzer believed that the end of the world was imminent and that it was the task of the true believers to aid God in ushering in a new era of history.

== Early life and education ==
Thomas Müntzer was born in late 1489 (or possibly early 1490), in the small town of Stolberg in the Harz Mountains of central Germany. The legend that his father had been executed by the feudal authorities is untrue. There is every reason to suppose that Müntzer had a relatively comfortable background and upbringing, as evidenced by his lengthy education. Both his parents were still alive in 1520, his mother dying at around that time.

Shortly after 1490, the family moved to the neighbouring and slightly larger town of Quedlinburg, and it was as "Thomas Munczer de Quedlinburgk" that he enrolled at the University of Leipzig in 1506. Here he may have studied the arts or even theology: relevant records are missing, and it is uncertain whether Müntzer graduated from Leipzig. In late 1512, he enrolled at the Viadriana University of Frankfurt an der Oder. It is not known what degrees he had obtained by 1514, when he found employment within the church: almost certainly a bachelor's degree in theology and/or the arts; and possibly, but less certainly, a master of the arts. Again, the university records are incomplete or missing. At some time in this rather obscure period of his life, possibly before his studies at Frankfurt, he was employed as an assistant teacher in schools in Halle and Aschersleben, at which time, according to his final confession, he is alleged to have formed a "league" against the incumbent Archbishop of Magdeburg – to what end the league was formed is wholly unknown.

== Early employment and the Wittenberg contacts ==
In May 1514, he took up a post as priest in the town of Braunschweig (Brunswick), where he was occupied on and off for the next few years. It was here that he began to question the practices of the Catholic Church, and to criticize, for example, the selling of indulgences. In letters of this time, he is already being addressed by friends as a "castigator of unrighteousness". Between 1515 and 1516, he also managed to find a job as schoolmaster at a nunnery in Frose, near Aschersleben.

In the autumn of 1517, he was in Wittenberg, met with Martin Luther, and became involved in the great discussions which preceded the posting of Luther's 95 Theses. He attended lectures at the university there, and was exposed to Luther's ideas as well as other ideas originating with the Renaissance humanists, among whom was Andreas Bodenstein von Karlstadt, who later became a radical opponent of Luther. Müntzer did not remain in Wittenberg for long, and was reported in various other locations in Thuringia and Franconia. He continued to be paid for his position at Braunschweig until early 1519, when he turned up in the town of Jüterbog, north-east of Wittenberg, where he had been asked to stand in for the preacher Franz Günther. Günther had already been preaching the reformed gospel, but had found himself attacked by the local Franciscans; requesting leave of absence, he left the scene and Müntzer was sent in. The latter picked up where Günther had left off. Before long, the local ecclesiastics were complaining bitterly about Müntzer's heretical "articles" which challenged both church teaching and church institutions. By this time, Müntzer was not simply following Luther's teachings; he had already begun to study the works of the mystics Henry Suso and Johannes Tauler, was seriously wondering about the possibility of enlightenment through dreams and visions, had thoroughly explored the early history of the Christian church, and was in correspondence with other radical reformers such as Karlstadt.

In June 1519, Müntzer attended the disputation in Leipzig between the reformers of Wittenberg (Luther, Karlstadt, and Philip Melanchthon) and the Catholic Church hierarchy (represented by Johann Eck). This was one of the high points of the early Reformation. Müntzer did not go unnoticed by Luther, who recommended him to a temporary post in the town of Zwickau. However, at the end of that year, he was still employed in a nunnery at Beuditz, near Weissenfels. He spent the entire winter studying works by the mystics, the humanists, and the church historians.

== Zwickau ==
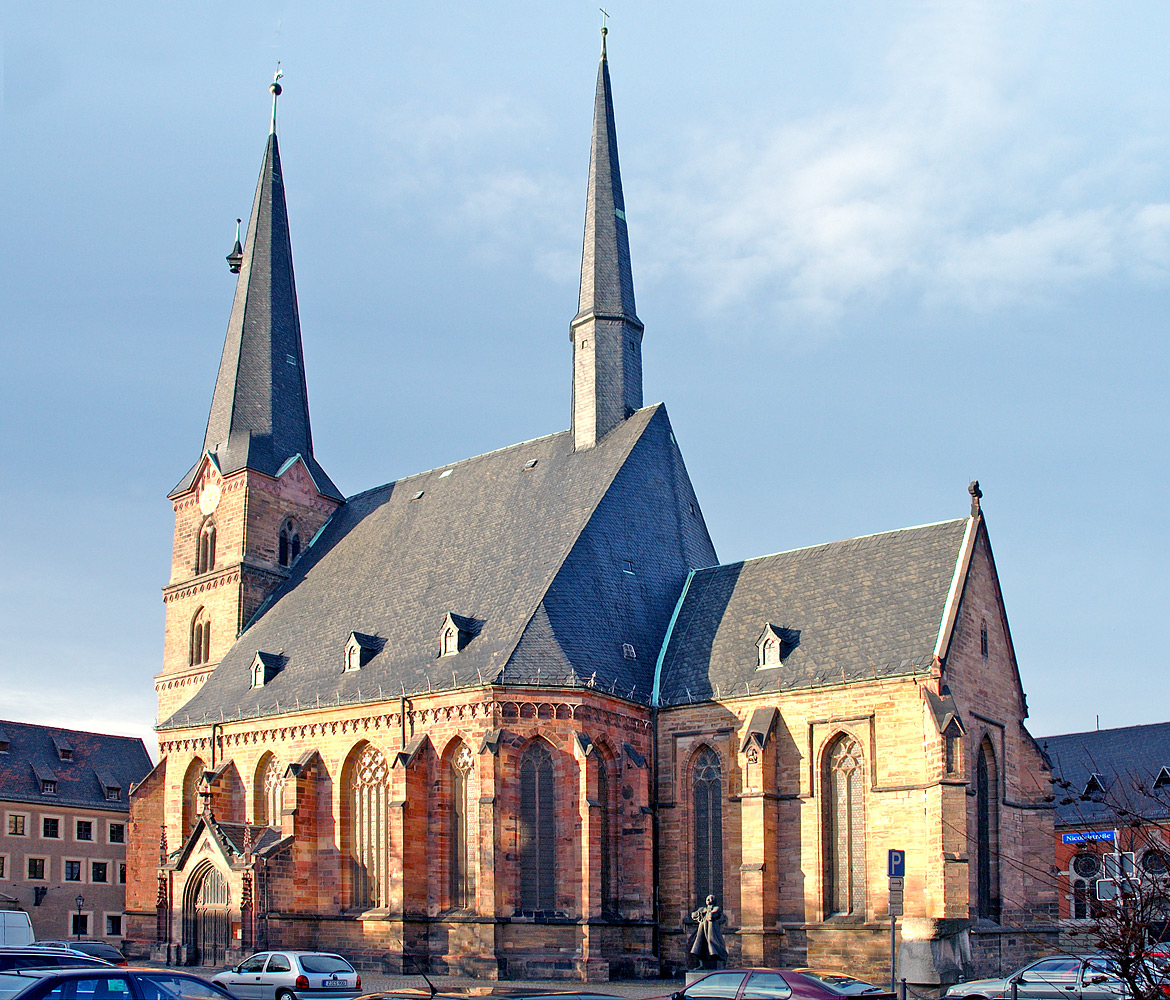
St Katharine's Church in Zwickau, where Thomas Müntzer preached

In May 1520, Müntzer was able to capitalize on the recommendation made by Luther a year earlier, and stood in as temporary replacement for a reformist/humanist preacher named Johann Sylvanus Egranus at St Mary's Church in the busy town of Zwickau (population at that time ca. 7,000), near the border with Bohemia. Zwickau was in the middle of the important iron- and silver-mining area of the Erzgebirge, and was also home to a significant number of plebeians, primarily weavers. Money from the mining operations, and from the commercial boom which mining generated, had infiltrated the town. This led to an increasing division between rich and poor citizens, and a parallel consolidation of larger manufacturers over small-scale craftsmen. Social tensions ran high. It was a town which, although exceptional for the times, nurtured conditions which presaged the trajectory of many towns over the following two centuries.

At St Mary's, Müntzer carried on as he had started in Jüterbog. This brought him into conflict with the representatives of the established church. He still regarded himself as a follower of Luther, however, and as such he retained the support of the town council, so much so that when Egranus returned to post in late September 1520, the town council appointed Müntzer to a permanent post at St Katharine's Church.

St Katharine's was the church of the weavers. Even before the arrival of Lutheran doctrines, there was already in Zwickau a reform movement inspired by the Hussite Reformation of the 15th century, especially in its radical, apocalyptic Taborite flavour. Amongst the Zwickau weavers this movement was particularly strong, along with spiritualism. Nikolaus Storch was active here, a self-taught radical who placed every confidence in spiritual revelation through dreams. Soon he and Müntzer were acting in concert. In the following months, Müntzer found himself more and more at odds with Egranus, the local representative of the Wittenberg movement, and increasingly embroiled in riots against the local Catholic priests. The town council became nervous at what was going on at St Katharine's, and in April 1521 at last decided that enough was enough: Müntzer was dismissed from his post and was forced to leave Zwickau.

== Prague and months of wandering ==
Müntzer crossed over the border into Bohemia to the town of Žatec (Saaz); this town was known as one of the five "safe citadels" of the radical Taborites of Bohemia. But Müntzer only used this as a stop-over en route to Prague. It was in Prague that the Hussite Church was already firmly established and Müntzer thought to find a safe home where he could develop his increasingly un-Lutheran ideas. He arrived here in late June 1521, was welcomed as a "Martinist" (a follower of Luther), and was allowed to preach and to give lectures. He also found the time to prepare a summary of his own beliefs, which appeared in a document known to posterity, slightly misleadingly, as the Prague Manifesto. This document exists in four forms: one in Czech, one in Latin, and two in German. One of them is written on a large piece of paper, about 50 by 50 centimetres (20 by 20 in), much like a poster, but written on both sides. However, it is evident that none of the four items was ever published in any shape or form. The contents of this document indicate clearly just how far he had diverged from the road of the Wittenberg reformers, and how much he believed that the reform movement was something apocalyptic in nature. "I, Thomas Müntzer, beseech the church not to worship a mute God, but a living and speaking one; none of the gods is more contemptible to the nations than this living one to Christians who have no part of him."

In November or December 1521, having discovered that Müntzer was not at all what they had supposed, the Prague authorities ran him out of town. The next twelve months were spent wandering in Saxony: he turned up in Erfurt and in Nordhausen, in each of which he spent several weeks, applying for suitable posts but failing to be appointed. He also visited his hometown in Stolberg to give sermons (Easter), and in November 1522 visited Weimar to attend a disputation. From December 1522 until March 1523, he found employment as chaplain at a nunnery at Glaucha just outside Halle. Here he found little opportunity to continue with his desire for change, despite the existence of a strong and militant local reform movement; his one attempt to break the rules, by delivering the communion "in both kinds" (Utraquism) to a noblewoman named Felicitas von Selmenitz probably led directly to his dismissal.

== Allstedt ==
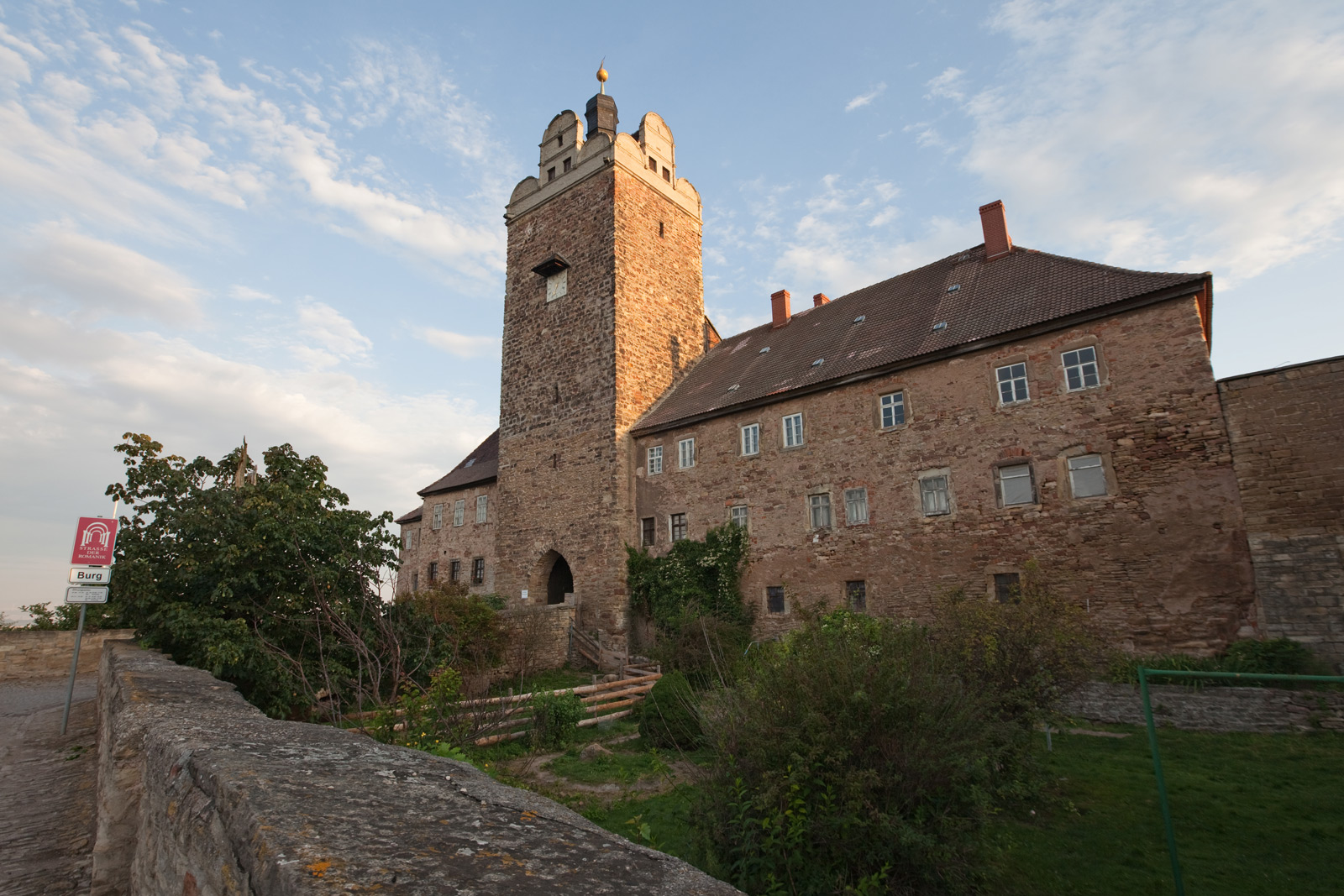
The castle at Allstedt

His next post was both relatively permanent and productive. In early April 1523, through the patronage of Selmenitz, he was appointed as preacher at St John's Church in Allstedt in Saxony. He found himself working alongside another reformer, Simon Haferitz who preached at the church of St Wigberti. The town of Allstedt was small, barely more than a large village (population 600), with an imposing castle set on the hill above it. Elector Friedrich held the right to appoint to St John's, but the town council either forgot to advise him, or did not feel that his approval was necessary. Almost immediately on arrival, Müntzer was preaching his version of the reformed doctrines, and delivering the standard church services and masses in German. Such was the popularity of his preaching and the novelty of hearing services in German that people from the surrounding countryside and towns were soon flocking to Allstedt. Some reports suggest that upwards of two thousand people were on the move every Sunday. Within weeks, Luther heard of this and wrote to the Allstedt authorities, asking them to persuade Müntzer to come to Wittenberg for closer inspection. Müntzer refused to go. He was far too busy carrying through his Reformation and wanted no discussion "behind closed doors". At this time, he also married Ottilie von Gersen, a former nun; in the spring of 1524, Ottilie gave birth to a son.

It was not only Luther who was concerned. The Catholic Count Ernst von Mansfeld spent the summer of 1523 trying to prevent his own subjects from attending the reformed services in Allstedt. Müntzer felt secure enough to pen a letter to the count in September, ordering him to leave off his tyranny: "I am as much a Servant of God as you, so tread gently, for the whole world has to be exercised in patience. Don't grab, or the old coat may tear. (...) I will deal with you a thousand times more drastically than Luther with the Pope."

Throughout the remainder of 1523, and into 1524, Müntzer consolidated his reformed services and spread his message in the small town. He arranged for the printing of his German Church Service; the Protestation or Proposition by Thomas Müntzer from Stolberg in the Harz Mountains, now pastor of Allstedt, about his teachings; and On the Counterfeit Faith, in which he set out his belief that the true faith came from inner spiritual suffering and despair. In the spring of 1524, supporters of Müntzer burned down a small pilgrimage chapel at Mallerbach, much to the annoyance of the abbess of the Naundorf nunnery. The town council and the castellan failed to do anything about her complaint. But in July, Müntzer was invited before the Electoral Duke Johann in Allstedt Castle, possibly in lieu of a belated "trial sermon", and there he preached his famous sermon on the Second Chapter of the Book of Daniel (aka The Sermon Before the Princes) – a barely concealed warning to the princes that they should pitch in with the Allstedt reforms or face the wrath of God.

What a pretty spectacle we have before us now – all the eels and snakes coupling together immorally in one great heap. The priests and all the evil clerics are the snakes...and the secular lords and rulers are the eels... My revered rulers of Saxony...seek without delay the righteousness of God and take up the cause of the gospel boldly.

The immediate reaction of the princes is not documented, but Luther did not hold back: he published his Letter to the Princes of Saxony about the Rebellious Spirit demanding the radical's banishment from Saxony. However, the princes simply summoned all the relevant persons of Allstedt, Müntzer included, to a hearing at Weimar where, after being interrogated separately, they were warned about their future conduct. This hearing had the desired effect upon town officials, who back-pedalled rapidly and withdrew their support for the radicals. In the night of 7 August 1524, Müntzer slipped out of Allstedt (by necessity abandoning wife and son, who were only later able to join him), and headed for the self-ruling Imperial Free City of Mühlhausen, around 65 kilometres (40 mi) to the southwest.

== Mühlhausen and Nuremberg ==
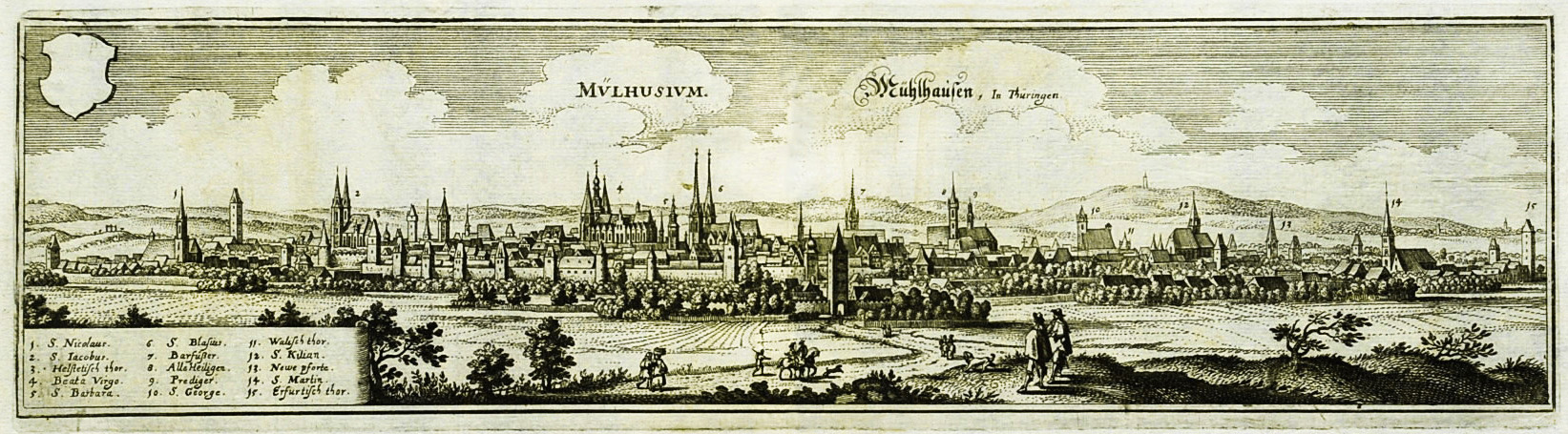
Panoramic view of Mühlhausen around 1650

Mühlhausen was a city with a population of 8,500. During 1523 social tensions which had been brewing for several years came to a head, and the poorer inhabitants had managed to wrest some political concessions from the town council; building on this success, the radical reform movement kept up the pressure, under the leadership of a lay preacher named Heinrich Pfeiffer, who had been denouncing the practices of the old church from the pulpit of St Nikolaus Church. Thus, before Müntzer arrived, there was already considerable tension in the air. He was not appointed to any pulpit, but this did not stop him from preaching, agitating, and publishing pamphlets against Luther. His comrade-in-arms here was Pfeiffer; while the two men did not necessarily share the same beliefs (as in Zwickau with Storch) there was enough common-ground in their reformatory zeal and belief in the inspired spirit to allow them to work together closely. A minor civic coup took place in late September 1524, as a result of which, leading members of the town council fled the town, taking with them the city insignia and the municipal horse. But the coup was short-lived – partly because of divisions within the reformers inside the town and partly because the peasantry in the surrounding countryside took issue with the "unchristian behaviour" of the urban radicals. After only seven weeks in the town, on 27 September, Müntzer was forced to abandon wife and child once more and escape with Pfeiffer to a safer haven.

He travelled first to Nuremberg in the south, where he arranged for the publication of his anti-Lutheran pamphlet A Highly Provoked Vindication and Refutation of the unspiritual soft-living flesh in Wittenberg, as well as one entitled A Manifest Exposé of False Faith. Both were confiscated by the city authorities, the former before any copies could be distributed. Müntzer kept a low profile in Nuremberg, clearly considering that his best strategy would be to spread his teaching in print, rather than end up behind bars. He remained there until November and then left for the southwest of Germany and Switzerland, where peasants and plebeians were beginning to organize themselves for the great peasant uprising of 1525 in defiance of their feudal overlords. There is no direct evidence of what Müntzer did in this part of the world, but almost certainly he would have come in contact with leading members of the various rebel conspiracies; it is proposed that he met the later Anabaptist leader, Balthasar Hubmaier in Waldshut, and it is known that he was in Basel in December, where he met the Zwinglian reformer Oecolampadius, and may also have met the Swiss Anabaptist Conrad Grebel there. He spent several weeks in the Klettgau area, and there is some evidence to suggest that he helped the peasants to formulate their grievances. While the famous "Twelve Articles" of the Swabian peasants were certainly not composed by Müntzer, at least one important supporting document, the Constitutional Draft, may well have originated with him.

== Final months ==
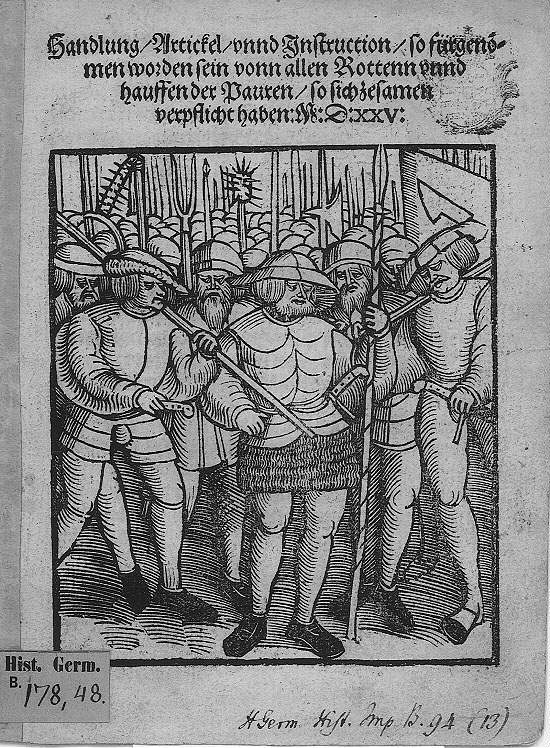
Rebellious peasants of 1525

In February 1525 Müntzer returned to Mühlhausen (via Fulda, where he was briefly arrested and then, having not been recognised, was released) and took over the pulpit at St Mary's Church; the town council neither gave, nor was asked for, permission to make this appointment; it would seem that a popular vote thrust Müntzer into the pulpit. Immediately, he and Pfeiffer, who had managed to return to the town some three months earlier, were at the centre of considerable activity. In early March, the citizens were called upon to elect an "Eternal Council" which was to replace the existing town council, but whose duties went far beyond the merely municipal. Surprisingly, neither Pfeiffer nor Müntzer were admitted to the new council, nor to its meetings. Possibly because of this, Müntzer then founded the "Eternal League of God" in late March (but some researchers date this League to September 1524). This was an armed militia, designed not just as a defence league, but also as a God-fearing cadre for the coming apocalypse. It met under a huge white banner which had been painted with a rainbow and decorated with the words The Word of God will endure forever. In the surrounding countryside and neighbouring small towns, the events in Mühlhausen found a ready echo, for the peasantry and the urban poor had had news of the great uprising in southwest Germany, and many were ready to join in.

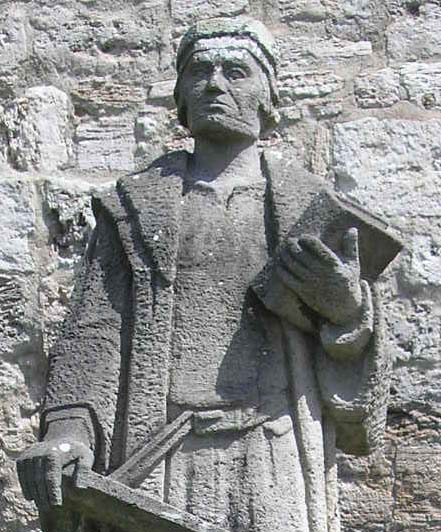
Statue to Müntzer in Mühlhausen

In late April, all of Thuringia was up in arms, with peasant and plebeian troops from various districts mobilized. However, the princes were laying their own plans for the suppression of the revolt. The feudal authorities had far better weapons and more disciplined armies than their subjects. At the beginning of May, the Mühlhausen troop marched around the countryside in north Thuringia, but failed to meet up with other troops, being content to loot and pillage locally.

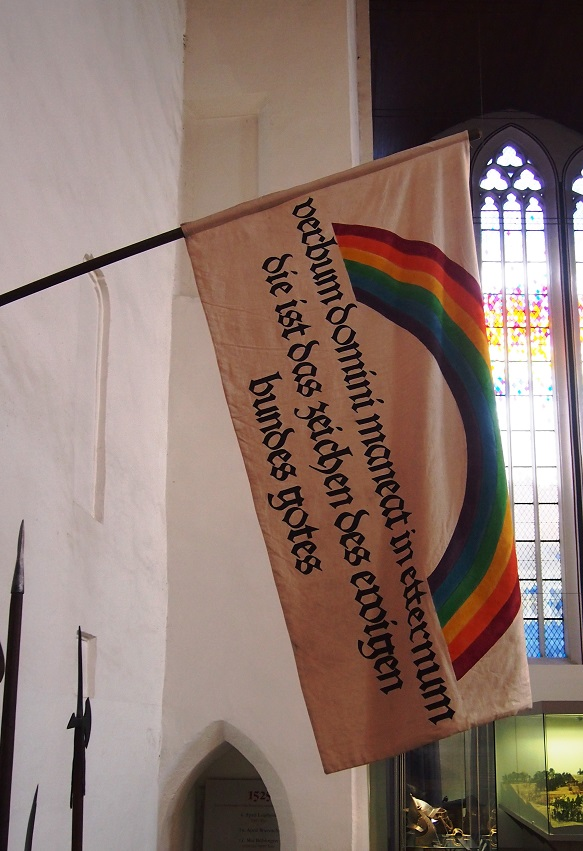
Replica Rainbow Banner of the Mühlhäuser band which set off for Frankenhausen under Thomas Müntzer

Luther pitched in very firmly on the side of the princes; he made a tour of southern Saxony – Stolberg, Nordhausen, and the Mansfeld district – in an attempt to dissuade the rebels from action, although in some of these places he was roundly heckled. He followed this up with his pamphlet Against the Robbing and Murdering Hordes of Peasants, calling for the ruthless suppression of the revolt. This had a title and a timing that could not have been more ill-considered since it was the German peasantry who at that time died in their thousands at the hands of the princely armies. Estimates put the figure at 70,000–75,000, possibly even as high as 100,000.

At length, on 11 May, Müntzer and what remained of his troops arrived outside the town of Frankenhausen, meeting up with rebels there who had been asking for help for some time. No sooner had they set up camp on a hill than the princes' army arrived, having already crushed the rebellion in southern Thuringia. On 15 May, battle was joined. It lasted only a few minutes, and left the streams of the hill running with blood. Six thousand rebels were killed, but only a few soldiers. Many more rebels were executed in the following days. Müntzer fled, but was captured as he hid in the upper storey of a house in Frankenhausen. His identity was revealed by a sack of papers and letters which he was clutching. On 27 May, after torture and confession, he was executed alongside Pfeiffer, outside the walls of Mühlhausen, their heads being displayed prominently for years to come as a warning to others.

== Theology ==
Müntzer's theology has been the subject of many studies over the years. Modern researchers agree that Müntzer was deeply read and that it was his theology, and not any socio-political dogma, which drove him to stand up to feudal authority. The short paragraphs below attempt to give a very brief summary of his theology.

=== Influences and study ===
Evident from Müntzer's writings is his broad knowledge of aspects of the Christian religion. From 1514 onwards, possibly earlier, he read widely in the early Christian fathers (Tertullian and Cyprian), in the history of the early church (Eusebius and Egesippus), in the mystics of the late medieval period (Suso and Tauler), in Humanist ideas which harked back to Plato, and in the Bible itself. By around 1522, after he had left Prague, most of his theology had matured and settled around some guiding principles, even if some details, such as the identity of "the Elect", were unclear.

=== The spirit, not the letter ===
Despite the profusion of biblical quotations in Müntzer's writings, it was his doctrine that true belief was dictated by spiritual experience, not by written testimony. The Bible was for him evidence only of spiritual experiences of the past; the words of the Bible still had to be validated by the working of the Spirit in the believer's heart. "If someone had never had sight or sound of the Bible at any time in his life, he could still hold the one true Christian faith because of the true teaching of the spirit, just like all those who composed the holy Scripture without any books at all." The insistence on written, Biblical proof by the "academics" or scholars (this included Luther) meant that it was impossible for the common man to gain a true understanding of the true faith. Müntzer's true believers (also known as "the Elect") were capable of reaching faith through personal suffering, guided by "true servants of God", and without regard to Catholic or Lutheran-reformed priests.

=== Dreams and revelations ===
Spiritual revelation came sometimes through dreams and visions and sometimes through suffering. In Zwickau, Müntzer's belief in the possibilities of revelation by dream matched the same belief in the sect of radicals led by Nikolaus Storch. Storch was later to confound Luther's colleague Melanchthon with plausible arguments about this. Müntzer himself clearly believed in the power of vision and dream, as evidenced by his lengthy and carefully argued Sermon Before the Princes, which discussed the dream of Nebuchadnezzar:

So to expect visions and to receive them while in tribulation and suffering, is in the true spirit of the apostles, the patriarchs, and the prophets. Hence it is no wonder that Brother Fatted Pig and Brother Soft Life (i.e. Luther) reject them. But when one has not yet heard the clear word of God in the soul, one has to have visions.

=== Suffering and pain ===
It was essential, in Müntzer's view, for a person to experience real suffering and pain – either spiritual or physical – in order to come to a true Christian belief. The theme of hardship and suffering, purgation and sevenfold cleansing, runs through all of his writings.

What you must do is endure patiently, and learn how God himself will root out your weeds, thistles and thorns from the rich soil which is your heart. Otherwise nothing good will grow there, only the raging devil... Even if you have already devoured all the books of the Bible, you must still suffer the sharp edge of the plough-share

On the very eve of Battle at Frankenhausen, he had this to say to the people of Allstedt:

May the pure fear of God be with you, dear brothers. You must remain unperturbed. If you fail to do so, then your sacrifice is in vain, your heart-sad, heart-felt suffering. You would then have to start suffering all over again... If you are unwilling to suffer for the sake of God, then you will to be martyrs for the devil

=== Fear of God and man ===
One of the principal dialectics in Müntzer's teaching is the opposition of the "Fear of Man" to the "Fear of God". Regardless of one's position in society, it was necessary for the true believer to have a fear of God and to have no fear of man. This was the thrust of his Sermon Before the Princes and it was the rallying call in his final letter to Mühlhausen in May 1525: "May the pure, upright fear of God be with you my dear brothers." In his Sermon Before the Princes he stated quite clearly: "The fear of God must be pure, unsullied by any fear of men or creaturely things. How desperately we need a fear like this! For just as it is impossible to fear two masters and be saved, so it is impossible to fear both God and created things and be saved."

=== Apocalypticism ===
Interwoven with Müntzer's mystical piety, as for many of his contemporaries, was a conviction that the whole cosmos stood at a tipping point. Now God would set right all the wrongs of the world, largely by destruction, but with the active assistance of true Christians. From this would emerge a new age of mankind. In the Prague Manifesto he wrote: "O ho, how ripe the rotten apples are! O ho, how rotten the elect have become! The time of the harvest has come! That is why he himself has hired me for his harvest." In a letter to the people of Erfurt, in May 1525, he wrote:

Help us in any way you can, with men and with cannon, so that we can carry out the commands of God himself in Ezekiel 34, where he says: "I will rescue you from those who lord it over you in a tyrannous way" [and] In Chapter 39 [...] "Come, you birds of heaven and devour the flesh of the princes; and you wild beasts drink up the blood of all the bigwigs". Daniel says the same thing in chapter 7: that power should be given to the common man".

=== "Omnia sunt communia" ===
In his final confession under torture of May 1525, Müntzer stated that one of the primary aims of himself and his comrades was "omnia sunt communia" – "all things are to be held in common and distribution should be to each according to his need". This statement has often been cited as evidence of Müntzer's "early communism", but it stands quite alone in all of his writings and letters. It may have been a statement of what his captors feared rather than what Müntzer actually believed. In the same confession, Müntzer is reported as recommending that princes should ride out with a maximum of eight horses and "gentlemen with two". Müntzer's own writings and letters clearly propose that power be taken from the feudal authorities and given to the people. For that proposal, he may be described as a revolutionary, but not proposing redistribution of wealth. Subsequent scholars have analysed Müntzer's movement as a communist movement. Friedrich Engels' analysis of Thomas Müntzer's work and the wider German Peasants' War led him and Karl Marx to conclude that the communist revolution, when it occurred, would be led not by a peasant army but by an urban proletariat.

=== Summary ===
The doctrines of essential suffering, of spiritual revelation, of denial of the fear of Man - all combined with the expectation of the Apocalypse to place the "Elect" person in total opposition to feudal authority, and to both Catholic and Lutheran teaching. However, this was no individualistic path to salvation. The importance which Müntzer laid on communal activities – the reformed liturgies and the leagues he founded or supported in Zwickau, Allstedt, and Mühlhausen – are central to his ministry. To judge from his writings of 1523 and 1524, it was by no means inevitable that Müntzer would take the road of social revolution. However, it was precisely on this same theological foundation that Müntzer's ideas briefly coincided with the aspirations of the peasants and plebeians of 1525. Viewing the uprising as an apocalyptic act of God, he stepped up as "God's Servant against the Godless" and took his position as leader of the rebels.

=== Differences with Luther ===
Müntzer was one of many preachers and theologians caught up in the extraordinary atmosphere of the early Reformation. In this period, from around 1517 to 1525, Martin Luther had no monopoly of the reforms. This was the time not only of Luther, but also of Erasmus of Rotterdam and fellow-Humanists, of the alchemists Paracelsus and Cornelius Agrippa, of localized urban and rural acts of defiance. The social upheavals triggered the Reformation - or more precisely, 'the reformations', for it was above all a time of massive dissent, and indeed dissent from dissent; in turn, the reformation of thought triggered further social and political upheavals.

In this roiling pot of ideas, Müntzer quite readily respected Luther for a period and then just as readily rejected the Lutheran doctrines. Although it is clear in retrospect that Müntzer's ideas were already diverging from Luther's at least as early as the period in Zwickau, Müntzer himself may not have been aware of this. Luther, like Müntzer, had shown an avid interest in the mystic and theologian Johannes Tauler. Müntzer may even have looked at Luther's many admiring references to Tauler in his Theologia Germanica and assumed him to be a fellow fan of Tauler's work. In July 1520, Müntzer was still able to sign off a letter to Luther as "Thomas Müntzer, whom you brought to birth by the gospel". However, it is clear that Luther considered that Müntzer was moving ahead too fast, and correspondence (now missing) from Wittenberg seems to have contained explicit criticisms of his activities. By March 1522, Müntzer was writing to Melanchthon in Wittenberg, warning that "our most beloved Martin acts ignorantly because he does not want to offend the little ones... Dear brothers, leave your dallying, the time has come! Do not delay, summer is at the door. ... Do not flatter your princes, otherwise you will live to see your undoing." An attempt at reconciliation with Luther, in a letter written by Müntzer from Allstedt in July 1523, went without reply. In June 1524, however, Luther published his pamphlet A Letter to the Princes of Saxony concerning the Rebellious Spirit, which essentially called on Prince Friedrich and Duke Johann to deal firmly with the "rebellious spirit of Allstedt", this "bloodthirsty Satan". Luther displayed his own conviction in which he was sure that Müntzer's preaching would lead to violence, as noted in his 1524, Letter to the Princes of Saxony Concerning the Rebellious Spirit. Müntzer then reacted with his Vindication and Refutation, in which he tears into Luther as having an unholy and self-serving alliance with princes and therefore partakes in the tyranny committed to the people. Shortly afterwards, Müntzer described Luther as "Brother Fatted Pig and Brother Soft Life" in his Sermon Before the Princes. After the summer of 1524, the tone of the written conflict became ever more bitter on both sides, culminating in Müntzer's pamphlet A Highly-Provoked Vindication and a Refutation of the Unspiritual Soft-living Flesh in Wittenberg of 1524, and in Luther's A Terrible History and Judgement of God on Thomas Müntzer of 1525, in which the radical preacher (by then dead) was described as "a murderous and bloodthirsty prophet".

== Works printed by Müntzer during his lifetime ==
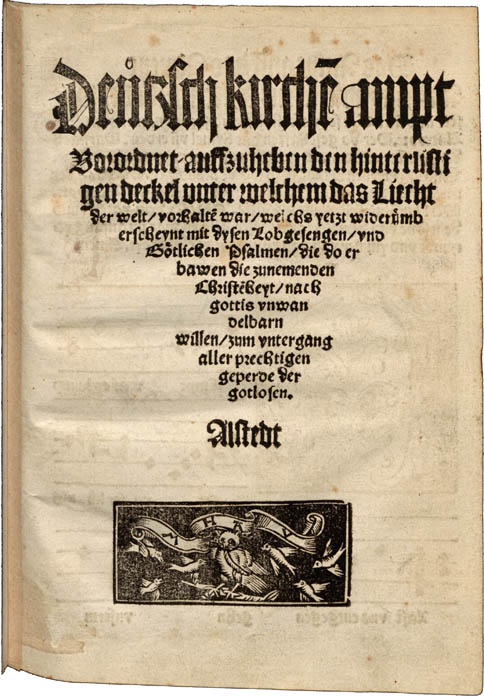
The cover of Müntzer's German Church Service, printed in Allstedt in 1523

- German Church Service, A reformed order for Church services in German, which takes away the covering treacherously devised to conceal the Light of the world. (May 1523) Deutzsch Kirchen Ampt, vorordnet, auffzuheben den hinterlistigen Deckel etc.
- The Order and Explanation of the German Church Service in Allstedt. (May 1523) Ordnung und Berechunge des Teutschen Ampts zu Alstadt
- A Sober Missive to his Dear Brothers in Stolberg, Urging them to Avoid Unrighteous Uproar. (July 1523) Ein ernster Sendebrieff an seine lieben Bruder zu Stolberg, unfuglichen Auffrur zu meiden
- Counterfeit Faith. (December 1523) Von dem getichten Glawben.
- Protestation or Proposition. (January 1524) Protestation odder Empietung.
- Interpretation of the Second Chapter of Daniel the Prophet. (July 1524) Ausslegung des andern Unterschyds Danielis dess Propheten
- The German Evangelical Mass. (August 1524) Deutsch Euangelisch Messze
- A Manifest Exposé of the False Faith, presented to the Faithless World. (October 1524) Aussgetrueckte Emplössung des falschen Glaubens der ungetrewen Welt.
- A Highly-Provoked Vindication and a Refutation of the Unspiritual, Soft-Living Flesh in Wittenberg. (December 1524) Hoch verursachte Schutzrede und Antwwort wider das gaistlosse sanfft lebende Fleysch zuo Wittenberg

== Legacy ==
During the last two years of his life, Müntzer had come into contact with a number of other radicals; prominent amongst them were Hans Hut, Hans Denck, Melchior Rinck, Hans Römer, and Balthasar Hubmaier. All of them were leaders of the emerging Anabaptist movement, which nurtured similar reformed doctrines to those of Müntzer himself. While it is not appropriate to claim that they were all or consistently "Müntzerites", it is possible to argue that they all shared some common teaching. A common thread links Müntzer, the early Anabaptists, the "Kingdom of Münster" in North Germany in 1535, the Dutch Anabaptists, the radicals of the English Revolution, and beyond. There was a short-lived legacy even within the "official" reformed church as well; in the towns where Müntzer had been active, his reformed liturgies were still being used some ten years after his death.

Friedrich Engels and Karl Kautsky claimed him as a precursor of the revolutionaries of more modern times. They based their analysis on the pioneering work of the German liberal historian Wilhelm Zimmermann, whose important three-volume history of the Peasants War appeared in 1843. It is not only as an early "social revolutionary" that Müntzer has historical importance as his activities within the early Reformation movement were influential on Luther and his reforms.

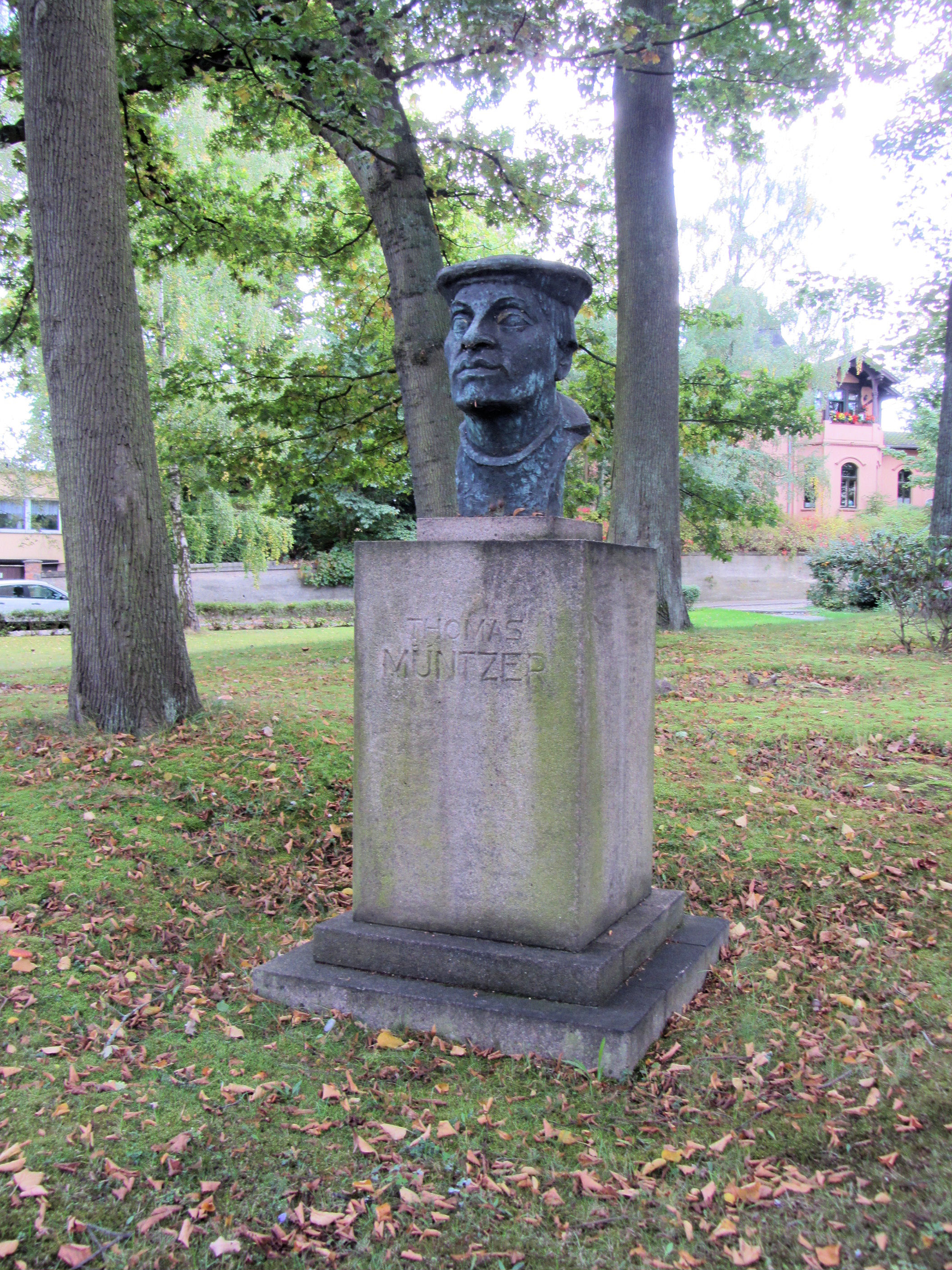
Bust of Thomas Müntzer in the Paulshöher Weg in Schwerin, Mecklenburg-Vorpommern, Germany

Further interest in Müntzer was spurred at various moments in German (occasionally European) history: during the creation of a German national identity between 1870 and 1914; in the revolutionary era in Germany immediately after 1918; in an East Germany looking for its "own" history after 1945 (Müntzer's image was used on the 5 East German Mark banknote); and leading up to the 450th anniversary of the Peasant War in 1975 and the 500th anniversary of Müntzer's birth in 1989. In terms of pure statistics, the number of books, articles and essays devoted to Müntzer rose dramatically after 1945. Before that year, around 520 had appeared; between 1945 and 1975, another 500; between 1975 and 2012, 1800.

Since around 1918, the number of fictional works on Müntzer has grown significantly; this encompasses over 200 novels, poems, plays and films, almost all in German. A film of his life was produced in East Germany in 1956, directed by Martin Heilberg and starring Wolfgang Stumpf. In 1989, shortly before the fall of the Berlin Wall, the Peasants' War Panorama at Bad Frankenhausen was opened, containing the largest oil painting in the world, with Müntzer in central position. The painter was Werner Tübke.

== Müntzer's wife ==
Very little is known about Müntzer's wife Ottilie von Gersen other than the fact that she was a nun who had left a nunnery under the influence of the Reformation movement. Her family name may have been "von Görschen". She may have been one of a group of sixteen nuns who left the convent at Wiederstedt, some miles north of Allstedt, of whom eleven found refuge in Allstedt. She and Müntzer were married in June 1523. Apart from the son born to her and Müntzer on Easter Day, 1524, it is possible she was again pregnant at the time of her husband's death, by which time, the son may also have died. A letter she wrote to Duke Georg on 19 August 1525, pleading for the chance to recover her belongings from Mühlhausen, went unheeded. No further reports of her life have been found.

== See also ==
- Christian anarchism
- Christian communism
- Christian socialism
- Utopian socialism
