= Andreas Karlstadt =

German theologian (1486–1541)

Minister Andreas Karlstadt
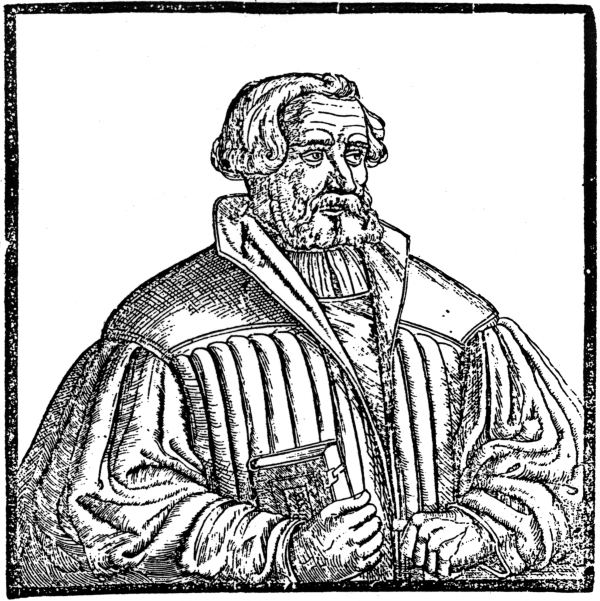
- Andreas Bodenstein von Karlstadt, portrait 1541/42
- Born: 1486; Karlstadt, Bishopric of Würzburg
- Died: 24 December 1541 (aged 55); Basel, Canton of Basel, Swiss Confederation
- Occupation: Theologian
- Theological work
- Era: Protestant Reformation

Andreas Rudolph Bodenstein von Karlstadt (1486 – 24 December 1541), better known as Andreas Karlstadt, Andreas Carlstadt or Karolostadt, in Latin, Carolstadius, or simply as Andreas Bodenstein, was a German Protestant theologian, University of Wittenberg chancellor, a contemporary of Martin Luther and a reformer of the early Reformation.

Karlstadt became a close associate of Martin Luther and one of the earliest Protestant Reformers. After Frederick III, Elector of Saxony concealed Luther at the Wartburg (1521–1522), Karlstadt and Thomas Müntzer started the first iconoclastic movement in Wittenberg and preached theology that was viewed as Anabaptist, but Karlstadt and Müntzer never regarded themselves as Anabaptists.

Karlstadt operated as a church reformer largely in his own right, and after coming into conflict with Luther, he switched his allegiance from the Lutheran to the Reformed camp, and later became a radical reformer before once again returning to the Reformed tradition. First, he served as one of many Lutheran preachers in Wittenberg. He travelled widely, but only within the borders of the Holy Roman Empire, visiting German-speaking, French-speaking and Italian-speaking lands. By the end of his life he had allied himself with Heinrich Bullinger in Switzerland and worked in Basel, where he eventually died. Despite coming closer to the Reformed tradition by the time of his death, Karlstadt maintained his own distinct understanding on many theological issues throughout much of his life.

== Education ==
Karlstadt received his doctorate of theology in 1510 from the University of Wittenberg. Previously, Karlstadt had been educated at Erfurt (1499–1503) and in Cologne (1503–1505). Karlstadt obtained his master's degree from the newly founded university at Wittenberg in 1505, and received his doctorate from the same university five years later.

In the same year in which Karlstadt received his doctorate he became archdeacon and the chair of the theology department. In 1511 he became chancellor of Wittenberg university. In 1512 he awarded Martin Luther his doctorate. From 1515–16, he studied in Rome, where he obtained the double degree in canon and civil law (utriusque juris) at the Sapienza university.

== Reformation ==
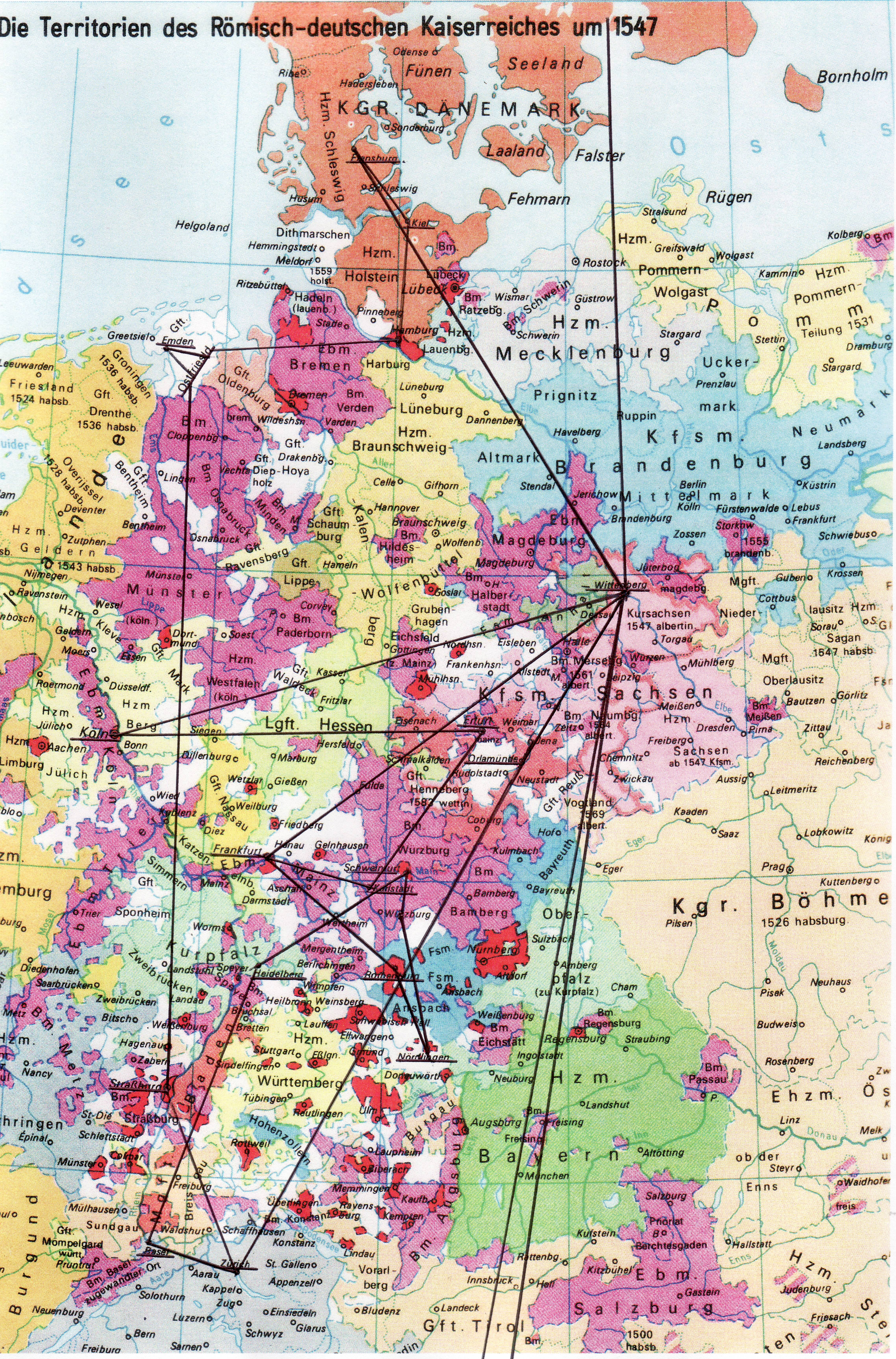
The most important stations in the life of Andreas Bodenstein; sketched in a political map at the year 1547.

Before 1515, Karlstadt was a proponent of a modified scholasticism. He was a "secular" cleric with no official ties to any monastic order. His beliefs were challenged during his stay in Rome, where he alleges he saw large-scale corruption in the Catholic Church, and on a document dated 16 September 1516 he wrote a series of 151 theses. (These should not be confused with Luther's 95 theses (1517) that attacked indulgences.)

In 1519, Johann Eck challenged Karlstadt to the Leipzig Debate. There, Eck debated with Luther as well as Karlstadt.

On 15 June 1520 Pope Leo X issued the papal bull Exsurge Domine that threatened Luther and Karlstadt with excommunication, and condemned several of their theses. Both reformers remained steadfast, and excommunication followed in 1521 in the papal bull Decet Romanum Pontificem.

After the Diet of Worms (January–May, 1521), and while Luther was hiding at Wartburg Castle, Karlstadt worked toward reform in Wittenberg. On Christmas Day 1521, he performed the first reformed communion service. He did not elevate the elements of communion, wore secular clothing during the service, and purged all references to sacrifice from the traditional Mass. He shouted rather than whispered the words of institution ("This is my body....", etc.) in German instead of Latin, rejected confession as a prerequisite for communion, and let the communicants take both bread and wine on their own during the Communion.

In January 1522, the Wittenberg city council authorized the removal of imagery from churches and affirmed the changes introduced by Karlstadt on Christmas. Karlstadt wrote his thesis "On the Removal of Images and That There Should Be No Beggars Among Christians" in 1522, shortly after this authorization from the city council. On 19 January Karlstadt married Anna von Mochau, the fifteen-year-old daughter of a poor nobleman. On 20 January the imperial government and the Pope ordered Frederick the Wise, Elector of Saxony to undo the changes. Frederick let most of the Mass revert to its Catholic form, but in a letter to the Wittenberg Council, he noted his personal compassion for Karlstadt.

=== Relationship with Luther ===
In the first week of March, Luther returned from Wartburg. From 9–16 March Luther gave eight sermons in which he stressed some theological similarities with Karlstadt, but, in hindsight, urged caution. This was a major turning point between Karlstadt and Luther. Karlstadt reasserted some of his moderately mystical leanings, continued wearing peasants' clothing, asked to be called "Brother Andreas," and became disillusioned with academic life, partly due to the influence of the Zwickau Prophets, whose theology stressed an importance on revelation from the Holy Spirit, rather than scripture. In fact, he renounced his three doctoral degrees, and, according to one source, "gave excellent but infrequent lectures."

In May 1523, Karlstadt was invited by the church of Orlamünde to be its pastor, and he accepted at once. Here he instituted all his radical reforms, and Orlamünde became the model of a congregationalist reformation. Church music and art were set aside, clerical matrimony was preached, and infant baptism was rejected. Perhaps most importantly, in Orlamünde Karlstadt denied the physical but affirmed the spiritual presence of Christ in the communion.

From Spring 1524, Luther started to campaign against Karlstadt, denying his right to publish and preach without Luther's authorization. In June, Karlstadt resigned as archdeacon. In July, Luther published the Letter to the Saxon Princes, in which he argued that Thomas Müntzer and Karlstadt agreed, and were both dangerous sectarians with revolutionary tendencies. Karlstadt defended the observance of the Sabbath, the seventh day of the week, as a holy day to the Lord. Martin Luther differed from him as he believed that Christians were free to observe any day of the week, provided it was uniform. His defense of the Sabbath, and others among the Anabaptists, caused him to be censured as a Jew and a heretic.

On 22 August 1524, Luther preached in Jena. Karlstadt hid in the crowd during Luther’s preaching, and wrote to Luther, asking to see him. This led to the well-known confrontation at the Black Bear Inn in a conversation recorded by a Martin Reinhardt and published within a month. There was a number of misunderstandings between the two men. For example, Luther said that he was convinced that Karlstadt had revolutionary tendencies, despite the fact that Karlstadt had all along rejected violence in the name of religion, and rejected Thomas Müntzer's invitation to join the League of the Elect. Karlstadt's answer was published in 1524 in Wittenberg, and is still extant. This showed that Karlstadt continued to reject the violence that led to the German Peasants' War. Another defamation was Luther's accusation that Karlstadt was not authorized to preach at the city church in Wittenberg during Luther’s stay at Wartburg. The conversation ended when Luther gave Karlstadt a guilder and told him to write against him. In September 1524 Karlstadt was exiled from Saxony by Frederick the Wise and George, Duke of Saxony. Luther also wrote against Karlstadt in his 1526 The Sacrament of the Body and Blood of Christ—Against the Fanatics.

=== Peasant War ===
When the Peasant War broke out, Karlstadt was threatened and wrote to Luther and asked for assistance. Luther took him in, and Karlstadt lived secretly in Luther's house for eight weeks. However, Karlstadt had to sign a pseudo retraction, titled "Apology by Dr. Andreas Karlstadt Regarding the False Charge of Insurrection Which has Unjustly Been Made Against Him." It also contained a preface by Luther. In March, Katharina, Luther's wife, became godmother to one of Karlstadt's children. Karlstadt was not allowed to preach or publish, and supported his family as a farmer and peddler near Wittenberg until 1529.

=== Iconoclasm ===
Some of the Protestant reformers, in particular Andreas Karlstadt, together with Huldrych Zwingli and John Calvin encouraged the removal of religious images by invoking the Decalogue's prohibition of idolatry and the manufacture of graven images of God. As a result, religious statues and images were destroyed and damaged in spontaneous individual attacks as well as unauthorised iconoclastic riots. Erasmus described in a letter of 1529 such a riot that had occurred in Basel:

They heaped such insults on the images of the saints, and the crucifix itself, that it is quite surprising there was no miracle. ... Not a statue was left either in the churches, or the vestibules, or the porches, or the monasteries. The frescoes were obliterated by means of a coating of lime; whatever would burn was thrown into the fire, and the rest pounded into fragments. Nothing was spared for either love or money.

Karlstadt has been seen as closely associated with "Bildersturm" (see Beeldenstorm), as he was at the time. In 1522, he convinced the Council of Wittenberg to order the removal of a number of images from the local churches, which had "catastrophic consequences." Martin Luther distanced himself from these actions. On 12 March 1522 Karlstadt spoke about Marian pictures, which were venerated at the time, and urged that they all be removed. Special aim was taken at Marian pictures visited in pilgrimages, but he also called for the removal of all public religious imagery and symbols. He asked for the destruction of Marian shrines such as the church Mary the Beautiful in Regensburg. Karlstadt was supported by Martin Bucer, Huldrych Zwingli and John Calvin.

Yet this was more than a local German event. Significant iconoclastic riots took place in Zürich (in 1523), Copenhagen (1530), Münster (1534), Geneva (1535), Augsburg (1537), and Perth (1559). The Seventeen Provinces (now the Netherlands and Belgium and parts of northern France) were hit by a large wave of Protestant iconoclasm in the summer of 1566. In the Netherlands this is called the "Beeldenstorm" and began with the destruction of all the images of the Monastery of Saint Lawrence in Steenvoorde after a "Hagenpreek" (field sermon) by Sebastiaan Matte, and the sacking of the Monastery of Saint Anthony after a sermon by Jacob de Buysere. The "Beeldenstorm" is often held to mark the start of the Dutch Revolt against the Habsburg rulers of the Netherlands, although the fighting did not begin in earnest for some years.

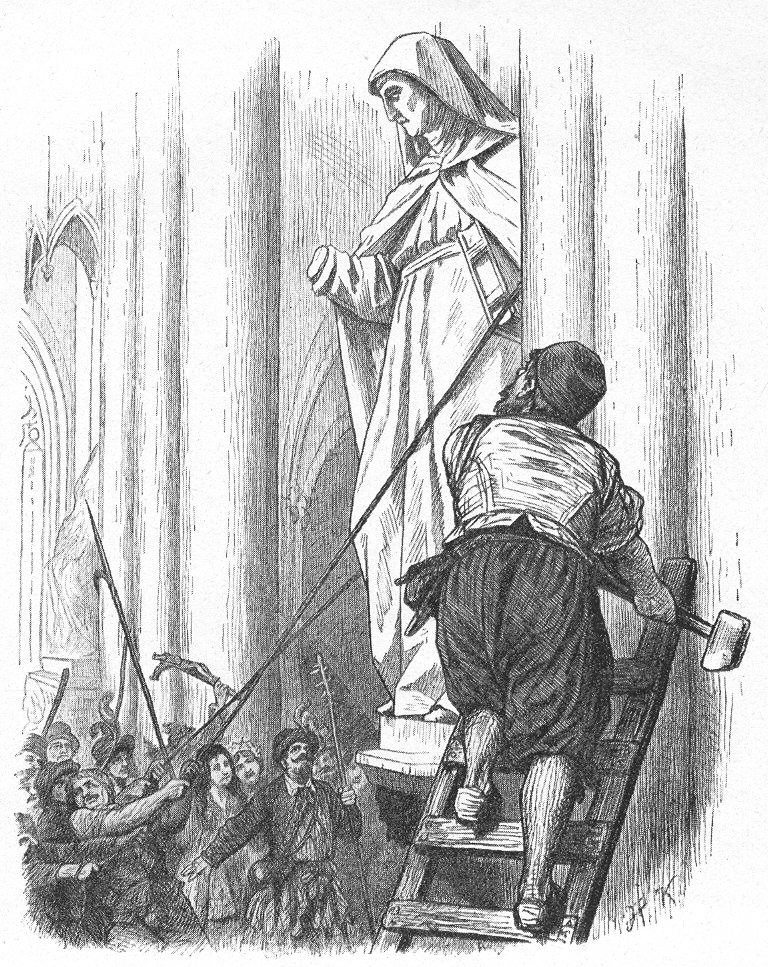
Illustration of the Bildersturm or Beeldenstorm

=== Death and legacy ===
Fleeing Saxony, Karlstadt served as a minister in Switzerland in Altstätten and Zürich. In 1534, he went to Basel as minister of the university church and Professor of Hebrew and Dean of the university. He remained in Basel until he died of the plague on 24 December 1541.

During Karlstadt's lifetime he published about 90 writings in about 213 editions. Between the years 1518–1525, 125 editions of his works were published in Germany, more than any other writer, save Luther. Karlstadt anticipated many Anabaptist viewpoints. His books on the Lord's Supper were published with the co-operation of the Swiss Brethren in Zürich, specifically Felix Mantz and probably Andreas Castelberg, as well as Karlstadt's brother-in-law, Gerhard Westerburg of Cologne, who baptized over 2,000 adults in his swimming pool. Karlstadt's influence on Protestantism in general included the abolition of mandatory celibacy (he married more than three years before Luther, and published several writings on the subject, both in Latin and German). As to images and liturgy, Karlstadt influenced, directly and indirectly, Zwingli, the Anabaptists, the Presbyterians, the Congregationalists, the Baptists and other Protestant groups. He had a remarkable impact on the furrier Melchior Hoffman, who spread Anabaptist ideas to northern Germany and what is now the Netherlands.

== Works ==
- On the Canon of Scripture (in Latin, De canonicis scripturis libellus 1520; in German, 1521-2)
- On the Removal of Images [Von abtuhung der Bylder], (Wittenberg 1522)
- On Baptism [Dialogus vom Tauff der Kinder], (Worms 1527)
- Letter from the Community of Orlamünde to the people of Allstedt, on how Christians ought to fight., (Wittenberg: 1524).
