= Bibliotheca dissidentium =

The Bibliotheca dissidentium (English, Library of Dissenters) is a series of 26 volumes (1980–2008) of historical editions of 16th century Non-Conformist religious works, largely in Latin, with scholarly introductions, essays and notations in French, German and/or English published by the Groupe de Recherches sur les Non-Conformismes du XVIe Siècle et l'Histoire des Protestantismes under the general editor, professor André Séguenny of the University of Strasbourg as part of the larger series Bibliotheca bibliographica Aureliana.

The Bibliotheca Dissidentium Neerlandicorum is an unrelated series, specific to Dutch Non-Conformists, published by Amsterdam University.

== Works ==
- 1. Johannes Campanus and Christian Entfelder, by Andre Seguenny. Justus Velsius, by Philippe Denis. Catherine Zell-Schutz, by Marc Lienhard. 1980.
- 2. Martin Borrhaus (Cellarius) by Irena Backus.
- 3. Johannes Bünderlin by U. Gabler, Wolfgang Schultheiss by W. Bellardi, Theobald Thamer by I. Backus).
- 4. Jacques de Bourgogne, Philippe Denis. Etienne Dolet, Claude Longeon. Casiodoro de Reina, by A. Gordon Kinder. Camillo Renato, by Simona Calvani. 1984.
- 5. Pierre Poiret, by Marjolaine Chevallier. 1985
- 6. Valentin Crautwald, by Peter C. Erb. Andreas Fischer, Jan Kalenec, by Waclaw Urban. Sigmund Salminger, by Irena Backus. 1985.
- 7. Eloy Pruystinck, by Emile Braekman. Sebastian Franck, by Christof Dejung, Antonio del Corro.
- 8. Daniel Bieliński, Stanisław Budzyński, Stanisław Taszycki, by Wacław Urban. Wojciech Calissius, Henrik Gmiterek. Piotr Gonesius, Marcin Krowicki, Andrzej Wojdowski, by Zdzisiaw Pietrzyk. 1987
- 9. Oswald Glaidt, by Daniel Liechty. Simone Simoni, di Claudio Madonia. Juan de Valdes, by A. Gordon Kinder.
- 10. Michael Servetus
- 11. The Heidelberg antitrinitarians : Johann Sylvan, Adam Neuser, Matthias Vehe, Jacob Suter, Johann Hasler ed. Christopher J. Burchill
- 12. Hungarian Antitrinitarians 1 : Ungarländische Antitrinitarier: István Basilius, by Mihály Balazs. Tamás Arany, by János Heltai. István Császmai, by János Herner. Lukács Egri, by András Szabo. Elias Gczmidele, by Antal Pirnat. 1990.
- 13. Antitrinitaires polonais II: Szymon Budny, Zdzislaw Pietrzyk. Pierre Statorius, par Jacek Wijaczka. Christian Francken, Adam Matuszewski 1991
- 14. Antitrinitaires polonais III Marcin Czechowic, Jan Niemojewski, Christoph Ostorodt
- 15. Hungarian Antitrinitarians 2 : Ungarlandische Antitrinitarier II György Enyedi
- 16. Alumbrados of the kingdom of Toledo : Jacobus Acontius, Marcello Squarcialupi
- 17. Jacob Kautz par Frank Muller. Pilgram Marpeck, Hans Schlaffer, Leonhard Schiemer by Stephen Boyd
- 18. Andrzej Frycz Modrzewski (Modrevius) par Andre Seguenny & Waclaw Urban
- 19. Russian Dissenters 1 : Dissidents russes. I. Feodosij Kosoj
- 20. Russian Dissenters 2 : Dissidents russes. II. Matvej Baskin, le starec Artemij by Mikhail V. Dmitriev.
- 21. Artistes dissidents dans l'Allemagne du seizième siecle: Heinrich Vogtherr; Hans Weiditz; Paul Lautensack,
- 22. The Family of love Hendrik Niclaes. by Alastair Hamilton. 2003
- 23. Ungarländische Antitrinitarier III: Demeter Hunyadi, von Annamária Poszar. Pál Karádi, von Éva Haas. Maté Toroczkai, von Mihály Balasz. György Válaszúti, von Katalin Nemeth. János Várfalvi Kósa, von Gizella Keseru. 2004.
- 24. Moravians - Mährische Sakramentierer des zweiten Viertels des 16. Jahrhunderts: Matej Poustevník, Beneš Optát, Johann Zeising (Jan Cízek), Jan Dubčanský ze Zdenína and the Habrova Brethren. Martin Rothkegel. 2005.
- 25. John Biddle (Unitarian) by Gordon A. Kinder. Francesco Negri, di. Luca Ragazzini. Stanisław Paklepka par Zdzisław Pietrzyk, Katarzyna Weigel par Wacław Urban.
- 26. Hungarian Antitrinitarians 4. Ferenc David Mihály Balázs and translated into English by Dr. Judit Gellesz.
- 27. in preparation Gerhard Westerburg by Russell Woodbridge, Valentin Ickelshamer by Sigrid Looss, Gabriel Ascherham by Martin Rothkegel.
