= Eloy =

Eloy or Eloi may refer to:

- Eloy, Arizona, a city in the United States
- Eloy (band), a German progressive rock band
- Eloy (album), the 1971 debut album of the band
- Eloy (film), a 1969 Argentine film
- Eloi, a fictional race in H. G. Wells' science fiction novel The Time Machine
- Eloi (name), a list of people with either the given name or surname
- Eloy (given name)
- Eloy (surname)

== See also ==
- Elois, a given name
