= Protestant Reformers =

Theologians who brought about the Reformation

Protestant Reformers were theologians whose careers, works and actions brought about the Protestant Reformation of the 16th century.

In the context of the Reformation, Martin Luther was the first reformer, sharing his views publicly in 1517, followed by Andreas Karlstadt and Philip Melanchthon at Wittenberg, who promptly joined the new movement. In 1519, Huldrych Zwingli became the first reformer to express a form of the Reformed tradition.

Listed are the most influential reformers only. They are listed by movement, although some reformers influenced multiple movements and are included in each respective section.

== Notable precursors ==
Throughout the Middle Ages, according to Edmund Hamer Broadbent, there were a number of Christian movements that sought a return to what they perceived as the purity of the Apostolic church and whose teachings foreshadowed Protestant ideas.

- Claudius of Turin
- Gottschalk of Orbais
- Berengar of Tours
- Peter Waldo
- Lorenzo Valla
- Wessel Gansfort
- Girolamo Savonarola
- Jacques Lefèvre d'Étaples
- John Wycliffe
- Jan Hus

== Magisterial Reformers ==
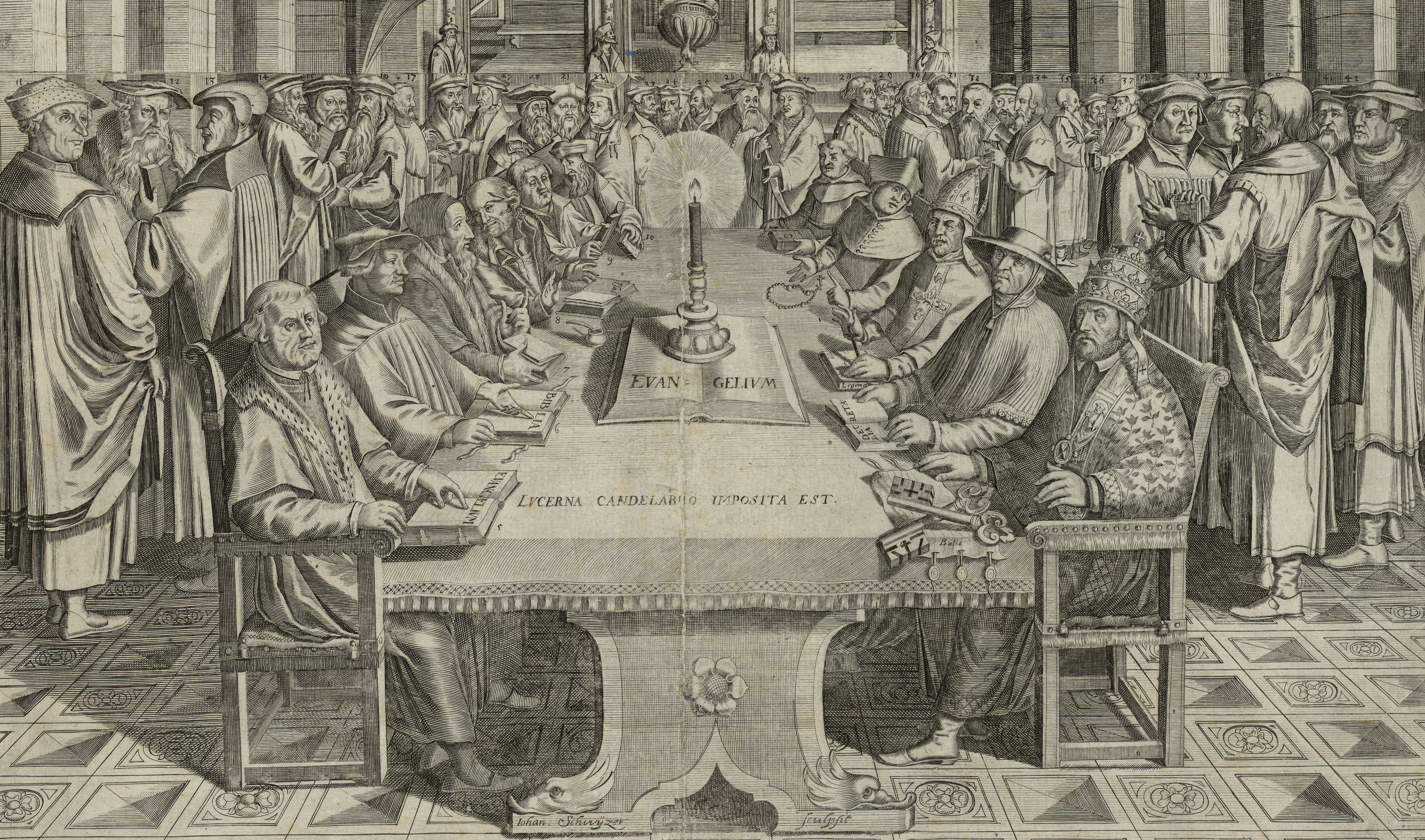
Fictitious dispute between the leading Protestant Reformers (sitting at the left side of the table: Luther, Zwingli, Calvin, Melanchthon, Bugenhagen and Oecolampadius) and the representatives of the Catholic Church

There were a number of key reformers within the Magisterial Reformation, including:

=== Lutheran ===
- Martin Luther
- Philipp Melanchthon
- Justus Jonas
- Martin Chemnitz
- Georg Spalatin
- Joachim Westphal
- Andreas Osiander
- Johannes Brenz
- Johannes Bugenhagen
- Andreas Karlstadt, later a Radical Reformer
- Hans Tausen
- Mikael Agricola
- Primož Trubar
- Jiří Třanovský

=== Reformed ===
- Huldrych Zwingli
- Martin Bucer
- John Calvin
- Heinrich Bullinger
- Theodore Beza
- William Farel
- John Knox
- Wolfgang Capito
- Johannes Oecolampadius
- Peter Martyr Vermigli
- Leo Jud
- Matthias Devay
- Jacobus Arminius
- Thomas Helwys

=== Anglican ===
- Thomas Cranmer
- Thomas Cromwell
- Matthew Parker
- William Tyndale
- Hugh Latimer
- Richard Hooker

== Radical Reformers ==
Important reformers of the Radical Reformation included:

=== Anabaptist ===
- Thomas Müntzer
- Zwickau prophets
- John of Leiden
- Menno Simons
- Dirk Willems

=== Schwenkfelder ===
- Kaspar Schwenkfeld

== Unitarian Reformers ==
Those spearheading the Unitarian Christian tradition include:

- Ferenc Dávid
- Michael Servetus

== Second Front Reformers ==
There were also a number of people who initially cooperated with the Radical Reformers, but separated from them to form a "Second Front", principally in objection to sacralism. Among these were:

=== Anabaptist ===
- Johannes Bünderlin
- Hans Denck
- Christian Entfelder
- Conrad Grebel
- Balthasar Hubmaier
- Felix Manz

== Counter-Reformers ==
Catholics who actively opposed the Reformation and partook in the Counter-Reformation include:

- Girolamo Aleandro
- Augustine Alveld
- Thomas Cajetan
- Johann Cochlaeus
- Johann Eck
- Jerome Emser
- Pope Leo X
- Thomas More
- Ignatius of Loyola
- Francis de Sales
- Pope Paul III
- Pope Pius V
- Charles Borromeo
- Francis Xavier
- Peter Faber
- Diego Laynez

== See also ==
- List of Protestant Reformers (alphabetical)
- Protestantism in Germany
