= Olaf Levonen =

German politician

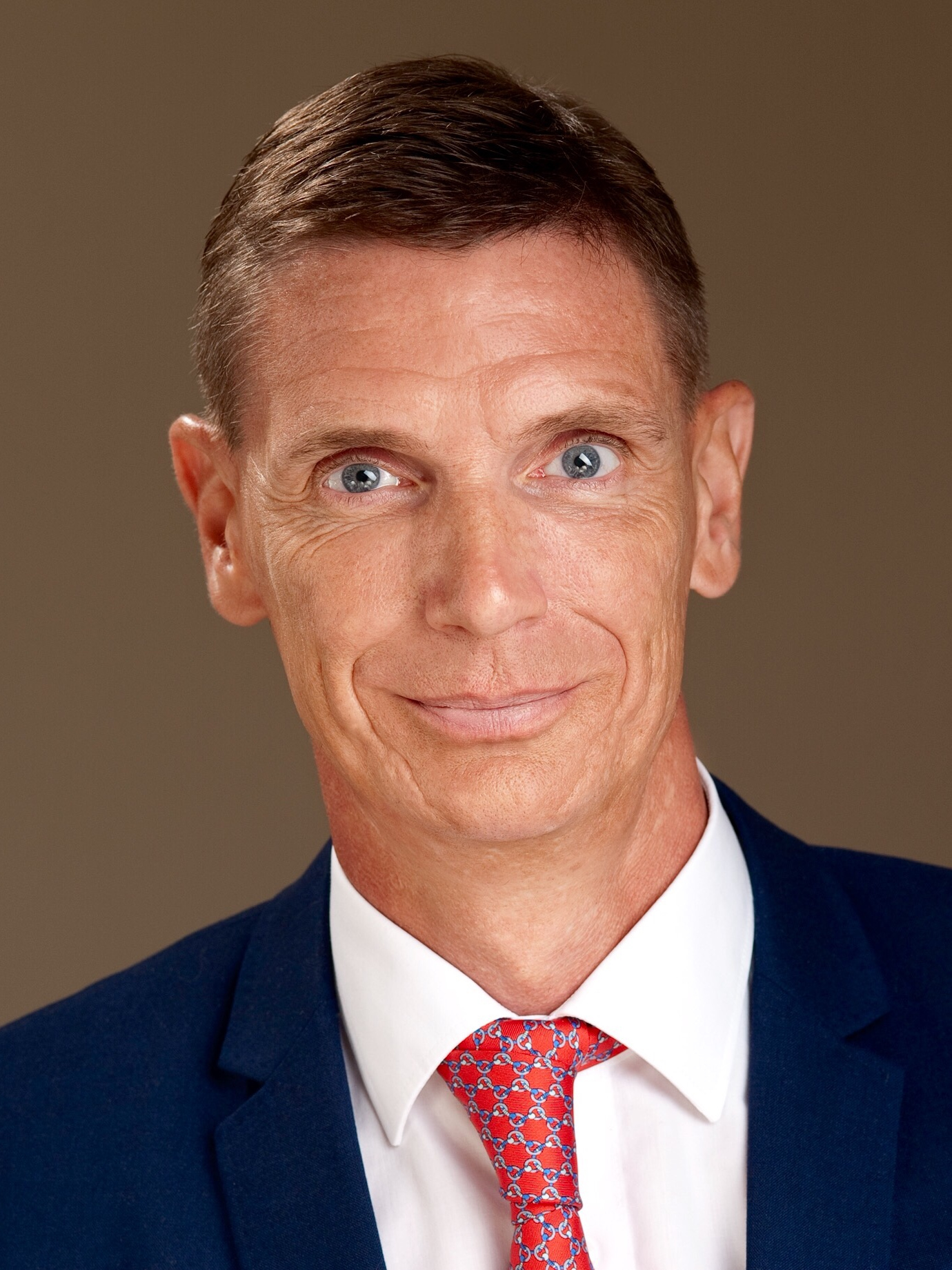

District Gouverneur (Landrat) of Hildesheim, Lower Saxony
- Incumbent
- Assumed office 2016
- Preceded by: Reiner Wegner

Deputy District Gouverneur (Erster Kreisrat) of Hildesheim, Lower Saxony
- In office 2011–2016
- Preceded by: Evelin Wißmann

Personal details
- Born: 29 December 1966 (age 59) Alfeld (Leine), Lower Saxony
- Party: Social Democratic Party
- Spouse: Sabine Levonen

Olaf Levonen (born 29 December 1966 in Alfeld (Leine)) is a German politician (SPD) and district gouverneur of Hildesheim, Lower Saxony.

== Career ==
Levonen has held various positions in the district administration of the district of Hildesheim since 1983. Since 2011, he had been the deputy district gouverneur. Levonen was elected district gouverneur of the Hildesheim district in 2016, succeeding Reiner Wegner (also SPD).

He is also President of the Board of Trustees of the Paul Feindt Foundation, Chairman of the Volksbund Deutsche Kriegsgräberfürsorge County chapter Hildesheim and vice-president of the Lions Club Hildesheim.

From 1999 to 2006, he was also managing director of the SPD parliamentary group in Hildesheim, as well as managing director of Public Hospital Corporation Alfeld from 2009 to 2016.

== Personal life and education ==
Olaf Levonen was born on 29 December 1966 in Alfeld (Leine), where he also spent his whole childhood and youth. He lives in Ummeln with his wife Sabine Levonen.

Levonen completed undergraduate studies with a bachelor's degree in business administration (Diplom-Kaufmann (FH)) at the AKAD University of Applied Sciences in Pinneberg. After further training for a Master of Public Administration (MPA) by distance learning, he earned a Master of Commercial Law (LL.M. com.) in Business Law for Corporate Practice, a practice-oriented postgraduate degree programme for non-lawyers, at the DISC – Distance and Independent Studies Center in Kaiserslautern.

Since 2020, Levonen publicly held a doctoral degree and declared that he had earned the internationally recognised degree of Doctor of Philosophy in Public Policy (PhD). In fact, it later turned out that this was not correct, as he was awarded the degree certificate by the internationally operating as diploma mill considered non-accredited Selinus University of Science and Literature Ltd, based in the Caribbean island nation of Dominica and with operating office in Bologna, Italy. Levonen's thesis, which he described as a doctoral dissertation and which had only 84 pages, was entitled "Human resource management in local government" and already contained linguistic and conceptual errors in the title.

== Publications ==
- 2020 HUMAN RESOURCE MANAGEMENT IN LOCAL GOVERNMENT, as well dissertation at Selinus University of Science and Literature Ltd. (Roseau, Dominica), GRIN Publishing: Munich, ISBN 978-3-34615-585-6.
- 2011 Der Begriff des öffentlichen Auftraggebers nach § 98 GWB am Beispiel einer kommunalen Wohnungsbaugesellschaft (The Concept Of "Public Contracting Authority" According To Section 98 Of The German Cartel Act on the Example of a Municipal Housing Association), Driesen Publishers: Taunusstein, ISBN 978-3-86866-126-2.
- 2008 Anspruch und Wirklichkeit des kommunalen Personalmanagements: eine empirische Untersuchung am Beispiel einer niedersächsischen Kreisverwaltung (Claim And Reality Of Municipal HR Management: An Empirical Study On The Example Of A District Administration In Lower Saxony), Driesen Publishers: Taunusstein, ISBN 978-3-86866-056-2.
- 2004 Politische Steuerung in einer modernen Kommune : dargestellt am Beispiel des Landkreises Hildesheim (Political Controlling in a Modern Municipality: Demonstrated By The Example Of The District Of Hildesheim), Eul Publishing Company: Lohmar, ISBN 978-3-89936-250-3.

== See also ==
- The district of Hildesheim's official website
- District of Hildesheim
