= Kosoy =

Kosoy, Kosoi or Cosoi (Russian: Косой meaning slanting, oblique, etc.) is a Russian masculine surname, its feminine counterpart is Kosaya. It may refer to

- Feodosy Kosoy (fl. 1550s), Russian serf-monk
- Stewart Kosoy (1950–2015), American video game designer
- Vasily Kosoy (1421–1448), Grand Prince of Moscow
- Vassian Patrikeyev (Vassian Kosoy), Russian ecclesiastic and political figure and writer
