= Stanisław Taszycki =

Polish nobleman

Stanisław Taszycki (fl. 1570s) was a Polish nobleman and supporter of the Polish Brethren and sponsor of a school at Luslawice from the 1570s. He was the instigator of Martin Czechowic writing his catechism. In 1585 he petitioned for the release of the printer Aleksander Rodecki who had been imprisoned for having printed an Antitrinitarian pamphlet by Christian Francken.
