= Bashkin =

Bashkin (Russian: Башкин) is a Russian surname. Notable people with the surname include:

- Matvei Bashkin (fl. 16th century), Russian boyar's son charged with heresy
- Pavel Bashkin (born 1978), Russian handball player
