= Wolfgang Grzyb =

German footballer (1940–2004)

Personal information
- Date of birth: 29 July 1940
- Date of death: 7 October 2004 (aged 64)
- Height: 1.65 m (5 ft 5 in)
- Position: Defender

Youth career
- 1958–1960: TSV Kaierde
- 1960–1964: SV Alfeld

Senior career*
Years	Team	Apps	(Gls)
1965–1978	Eintracht Braunschweig	305	(19)
- * Club domestic league appearances and goals

Wolfgang Grzyb (29 July 1940 – 7 October 2004) was a German footballer who played as a defender for Eintracht Braunschweig, spending 12 seasons in the Bundesliga.

On 30 August 1975, Grzyb became Braunschweig's first player to receive a red card in the Bundesliga, ending the club's eleven-season, 370 match, run without having a player sent off.

== Honours ==
Eintracht Braunschweig

- Bundesliga: 1966–67
