= Radical Reformation =

Anabaptist movement concurrent with the Protestant Reformation

The Radical Reformation represented a response to perceived corruption both in the Catholic Church and in the expanding Magisterial Protestant movement led by Martin Luther and many others. Starting in Germany and Switzerland in the 16th century, the Radical Reformation gave birth to many radical Protestant groups throughout Europe. The term covers Radical Reformers like Thomas Müntzer and Andreas Karlstadt, the Zwickau prophets, and Anabaptist groups like the Hutterites and the Mennonites.

In Germany, Switzerland and Austria, a majority sympathized with the Radical Reformation despite intense persecution. Although the surviving proportion of the European population that rebelled against Catholic, Lutheran and Reformed Churches was small, Radical Reformers wrote profusely, and the literature on the Radical Reformation is disproportionately large, partly as a result of the proliferation of the Radical Reformation teachings in the United States.

Old Order Anabaptists and Conservative Anabaptists have interpreted the heritage of the Radical Reformation to include "straightforward interpretation of and obedience to biblical commands regarding nonresistance and swearing of oaths, outward separation through dress, head coverings for women, permanence of marriage, submission, church discipline and two-kingdom theology."

== History ==
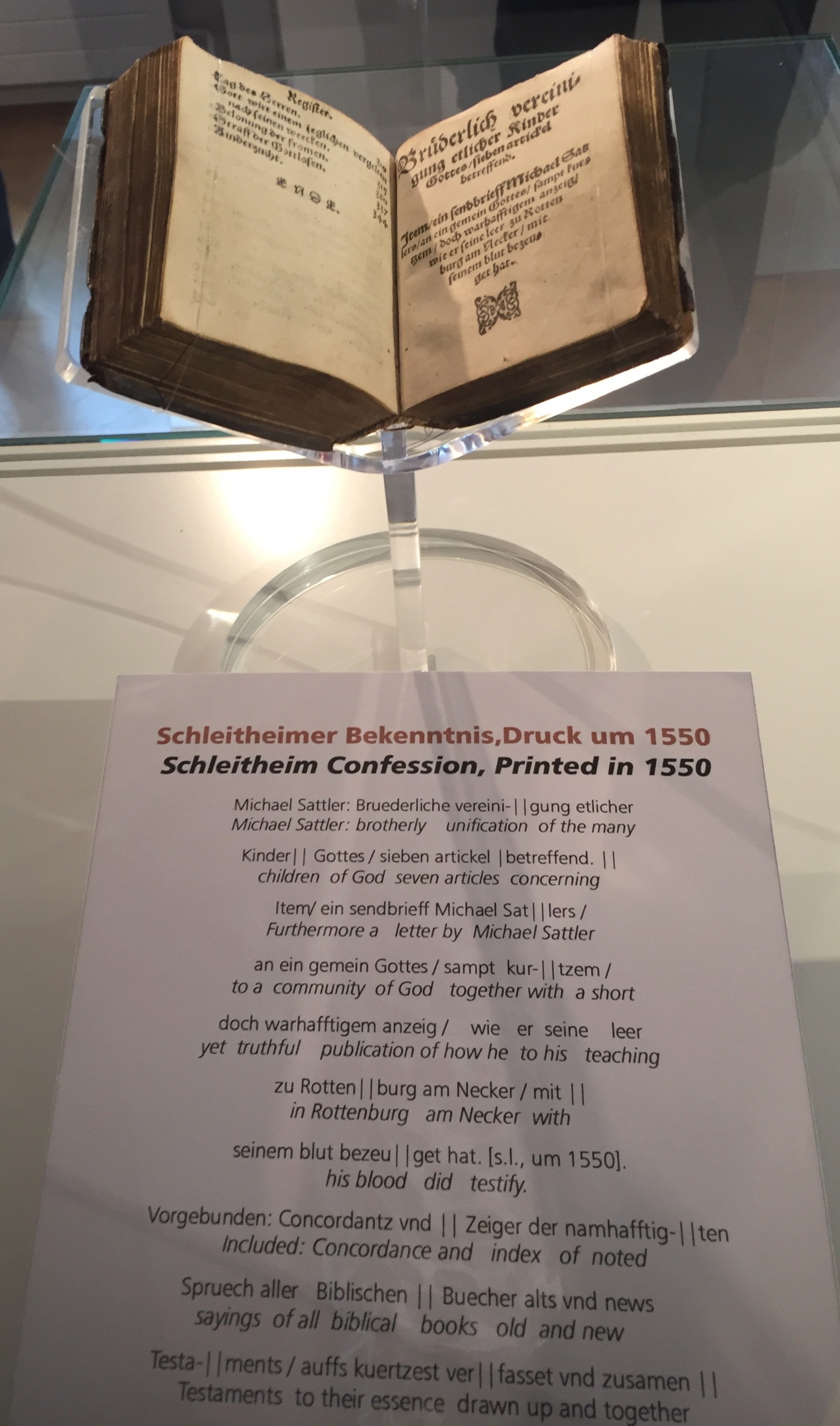
Schleitheim Confession printed in 1550, displayed in the Anabaptist Room of the Local History Museum in Schleitheim, Switzerland

Some early forms of the Radical Reformation were millenarian, focusing on the imminent end of the world. This was particularly notable in the rule of John of Leiden over the city of Münster in 1535, which was ultimately crushed by the combined forces of the Catholic Bishop of Münster and the Lutheran Landgrave of Hesse. After the Münster rebellion, the small group of the Batenburgers continued to adhere to militant Anabaptist beliefs. Non-violent Anabaptist groups also had millenarian beliefs.

The early Anabaptists believed that their reformation must purify both theology and the lives of Christians, especially their political and social relationships. Therefore, the church should not be supported by the state, neither by tithes and taxes, nor by the use of the sword; Christianity was a matter of individual conviction, which could not be forced on anyone, but rather required a personal decision for it.

Many groups were influenced by Biblical literalism (like the Swiss Brethren), spiritualism (like the south German Anabaptists) and mainly absolute pacifism (like the Swiss Brethren, the Hutterites and the Mennonites from northern Germany and the Netherlands). The Hutterites also practiced community of goods. In the beginning, most of them were strongly missionary.

== Later forms of Anabaptism ==
Later forms of Anabaptism were much smaller and focused on the formation of small, separatist communities. Among the many varieties to develop were Mennonites, Amish, and Hutterites.

Typical among the new leaders of the later Anabaptist movement, and certainly the most influential of them, was Menno Simons, a Dutch Catholic priest who early in 1536 decided to join the Anabaptists. Simons had no use for the violence advocated and practiced by the Münster movement, which seemed to him to pervert the very heart of Christianity. Thus, Mennonite pacifism is not merely a peripheral characteristic of the movement, but rather belongs to the very essence of Menno's understanding of the gospel; this is one of the reasons that it has been a constant characteristic of all Mennonite bodies through the centuries.

The Anabaptists of the Radical Reformation continue to inspire current community groups such as the Bruderhof and movements such as Urban Expression in the UK.

== Non-Anabaptist Radical Reformers ==
Though most of the Radical Reformers were Anabaptist, some did not identify themselves with the mainstream Anabaptist tradition. Thomas Müntzer was involved in the German Peasants' War. Andreas Karlstadt disagreed theologically with Huldrych Zwingli and Martin Luther, teaching nonviolence and refusing to baptize infants while not rebaptizing adult believers. Kaspar Schwenkfeld and Sebastian Franck were influenced by German mysticism and spiritualism. In 17th-century England, the tumultuous climate of the English Civil War and English Revolution saw the emergence of several movements that were influenced by or could be considered part of the Radical Reformation, such as the English Dissenters. One of these dissenting groups that developed along convergent lines with the continental Radical Reformation was the Religious Society of Friends, commonly known as Quakers, led by George Fox and Margaret Fell, among others.

== Other movements ==
In addition to the Anabaptists, other Radical Reformation movements have been identified. George Huntston Williams, the great categorizer of the Radical Reformation, considered early forms of Unitarianism (such as that of the Socinians, and exemplified by Michael Servetus as well as the Polish Brethren), and other trends that disregarded the Nicene Christology still accepted by most Christians, as part of the Radical Reformation. With Servetus and Faustus Socinus, anti-Trinitarianism came to the foreground.

== Beliefs ==
The beliefs of the movement are those of the Believers' Church. Unlike the Catholics and the more Magisterial Lutheran and Reformed (Anglican, Zwinglian and Calvinist) Protestant movements, some of the Radical Reformation abandoned the idea that the "Church visible" was distinct from the "Church invisible". Thus, the Church only consisted of the tiny community of believers who accepted Jesus Christ and demonstrated this by adult baptism, called "believer's baptism".

While the magisterial reformers wanted to substitute their own learned elite for the learned elite of the Catholic Church, the radical Protestant groups rejected the authority of the institutional "church" organization, almost entirely, as being unbiblical. As the search for original Christianity was carried further, it was claimed that the tension between the church and the Roman Empire in the first centuries of Christianity was normative, that the church is not to be allied with government sacralism, that a true church is always subject to be persecuted, and that the conversion of Constantine I was, therefore, the Great Apostasy that marked a deviation from pure Christianity.

== See also ==
- Anabaptism
- Bohemian Reformation
- Christian anarchism
- English Dissenters
- Justus Velsius
- Martyrs Mirror
- Radical Pietism
- Restorationism (Christian primitivism)
- Waldensians
- Oswald Glaidt
- Andreas Fischer
- Paul Fagius
- Johannes Reuchlin
