= Josepha Gasch-Muche =

German glass artist

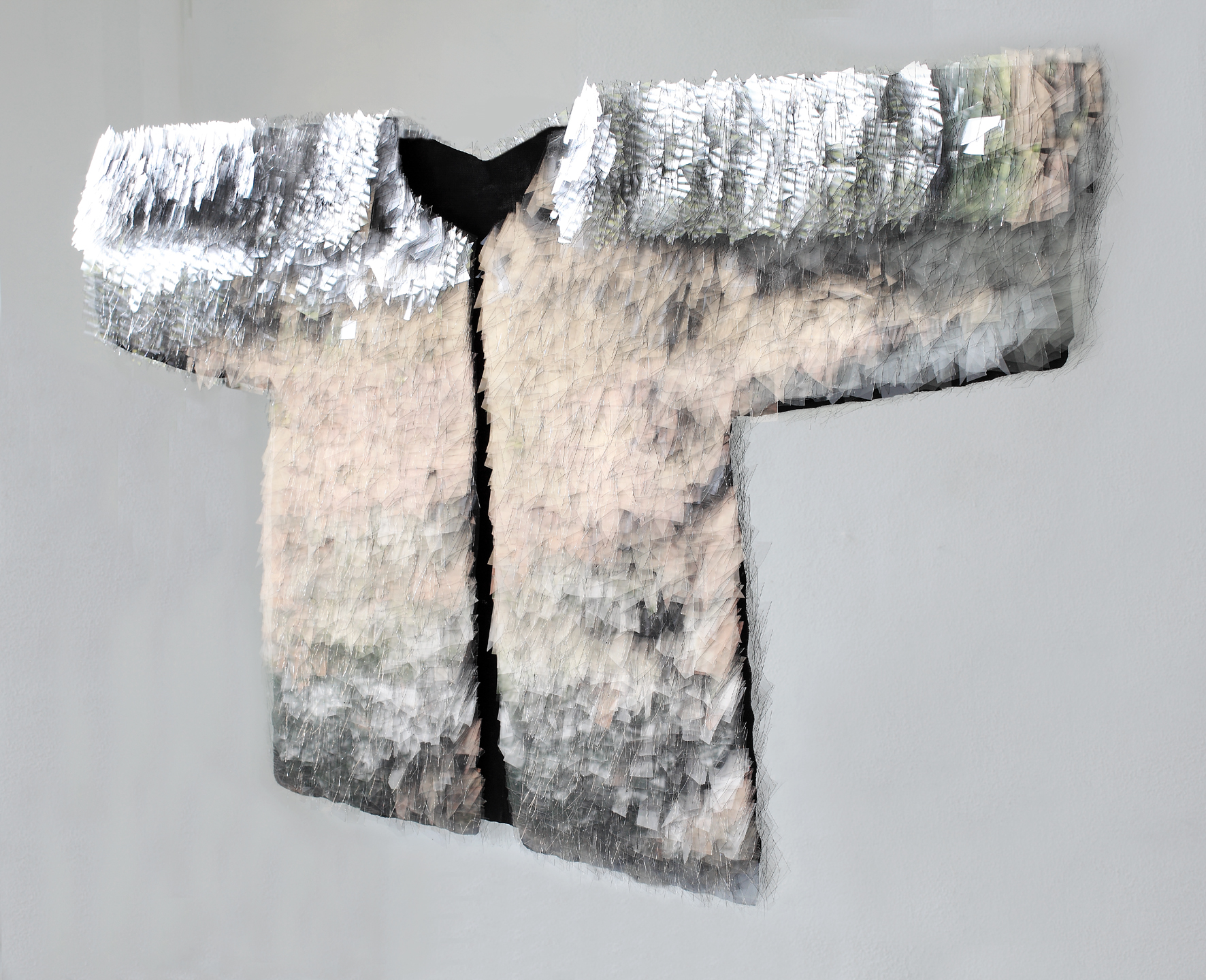
T. 12-06-2010 Displayglas, Leinwand 145x85x20

Josepha Gasch-Muche (born 1 June 1944) is a German glass artist.

Her work is held in the permanent collection of the Corning Museum of Glass in the United States.

== Biography ==
Gasch-Muche studied painting and drawing at the Academy of Fine Arts in Trier, Germany. She initially focused on etching and drawing and became interested in glass later on. In 1998 she developed an original method of fragmenting thin display glass into even thinner splinters by breaking it with pliers; she then arranges these shards on top of and next to each other before bonding them invisibly.

She has won several awards for her glass work, including the Coburg Prize for Contemporary Glass and the Bombay Sapphire Prize in 2006, and the Bayerischen Staatspreis in 2008. Now Josepha Gasch-Muche lives and work in Alfeld/Leine Germany.

== Books ==
- Lichtphänomene aus Glas. Distanz, Berlin 2014, ISBN 978-3-95476-079-4
