= Andreas Fischer =

Andreas Fischer may refer to:

- Andreas Fischer (footballer) (born 1964), German football coach and former player
- Andreas Fischer (footballer born 1991) (born 1991), Austrian footballer
- Andreas Fischer (Anabaptist), Austrian/Moravian Anabaptist
- Andreas Fischer (runner) (born 1968), German distance runner and winner at the 1987 European Athletics Junior Championships
