= Squarcialupi =

Squarcialupi is a surname. Notable people with the surname include:

- Antonio Squarcialupi (1416–1480), Florentine organist and composer
  - Squarcialupi Codex, a manuscript owned by Antonio Squarcialupi
- Marcello Squarcialupi (c. 1538 - 1599), Italian physician, astronomer and exile
- Ignazio Squarcialupi, three times abbot of Monte Cassino in the 16th century
