= Mihály Balázs =

Hungarian literary historian (born: 1948)

Mihály Balázs (born 1948) is a Hungarian Catholic historian and professor of religious history at the University of Szeged. He is widely regarded as an expert on the religious history of Hungarian-speaking Transylvania.

== Works ==
- Mihály Balázs, Early Transylvanian Antitrinitarianism (1566–1571) 1996
- J. Kaldos & M. Balazs (1993), Bibliotheca dissidentium. Répertoire des non-conformistes religieux des seizième et dix-sieptième siècles., Tome XV: Ungarlandische Antitinitarier II. Györgi Enyedi, Baden-Baden 1993
- Balázs, Mihály: Ferenc Dávid. Ungarländische Antitrinitarier IV. Bibliotheca Dissidentium. Répertoire des non-conformistes religieux des seizième et dixseptième siècles édité par André Séguenny. Valentin Koerner: Baden-Baden & Bouxwiller, 2008. (Tome XXVI. Bibliotheca Biographica Aureliana CCXXII.) 325 p. English translation Ferenc David, 2010.
