= Daniel Bieliński =

Daniel Bieliński (fl.1570s Kraków) was a member of the Polish Brethren of whom little is known except for his radical Judaistic views. In early debates among the Brethren he is considered the early leader of Judaizer element, against the more moderate positions of Gregory Paul of Brzeziny, Jan Niemojewski, Georg Szoman, Marcin Czechowic, and Piotr of Goniadz.
