= Jakob Schegk =

German physician and philosopher (1511 – 1587)

- Engraving of Jakob Schegk by Jost Amman
- Born: 6 June 1511; Schorndorf, Duchy of Württemberg
- Died: 9 May 1587 (aged 75); Tübingen, Duchy of Württemberg

Philosophical work
- Era: Renaissance philosophy
- Region: Western philosophy
- School: Aristotelianism
- Main interests: Metaphysics, medicine, theology

Jakob Schegk (also known as Jakob Degen, Johann Jacob Brucker Schegk, Jakob Schegk the elder, Schegkius, and Scheckius; 6 June 1511 – 9 May 1587) was a polymath German Aristotelian philosopher and academic physician.

== Origins and education ==
Born Jakob Degen in Schorndorf, son of the citizen Bernhard Degen, he adopted the name Schegk/Schegkius which he used his entire adult life. A prodigy in classical languages, having studied with Johann Reuchlin’s student Johann Thomas in Schorndorf, Schegk made rapid progress upon enrolling at the University of Tübingen in 1527, taking his M.A. in 1529. He was received by the university senate and began lectures in philosophy and classics while only twenty. He remained in Tübingen for his entire career.

== Academic career ==
He took over the administration of the Tübinger Stift giving him the opportunity to develop a competence in theology. He likewise studied law prior to turning his attention to medicine in the 1530s. He took a doctorate in medicine in 1539 after studying with Leonhard Fuchs and Michael Rucker. He remained on the arts faculty until joining the medical faculty in 1553. Nevertheless, his philosophical expertise was too great to go untapped, and the university gave him the unusual dual commission to hold lectures in both medicine and Aristotle from 1564 onwards. His poor eyesight hampered his mobility, and he became totally blind by 1577. He nevertheless continued his academic career. In philosophy, he was a leading German Lutheran Aristotelian and was regarded as one of the greatest philosophical authorities of his age. He died at Tübingen.

While somewhat neglected by modern scholarship, his numerous commentaries upon the Aristotelian corpus are highly regarded, especially his De demonstratione libri XV. He engaged a long running dispute against the Italian Aristotelian philosopher Simone Simoni. A committed Aristotelian, he resolutely opposed the philosophical innovations of Petrus Ramus. He likewise was involved in a dialogue with Thomas Erastus concerning the ubiquity of Christ's physical body in the Lord's Supper.

Prominent students included Nicolaus Taurellus and Andreas Planer, and Schegk exercised a more distant influence on the French Paracelsian Joseph Duchesne Quercetanus. Recent studies have demonstrated his long lasting impact on early modern medical theory. Hans Weber dubbed him “the father and pioneer of Protestant Scholasticism.”

== Works ==
- Antisimonius, quo refelluntur supra trecentos errores Simonii ... Eivsdem Iacobi Schegkii Apologeticus, oppositus calumniae G. Genebrardi, Parisiensis Theologi. Tübingen: Georg Gruppenbach, 1573 (VD 16 S 2464).
- Antilogia Jacobi Schegkii Schorndorffensis, qua refellit XXVII Propositiones Servetianae Haereseos Tübingen: Ulrich Morhart, 1568 (VD16 S 2463).
- De demonstratione libri XV Basel: Johannes Oporinus et al., 1564 (VD 16 S 2475).
- De Vna Persona & duabus Naturis Christi: Sententia Iacobi Schegkij D. Medici Et Philosophi Clarissimi, Professoris Scholae Tubingensis ex fundamentis quidem Scripturae Sacrae, analysi autem Philosophica, & piè & eruditè explicata. Frankfurt: Peter Braubach, 1565 (VD16 S 2493).
- Hyperaspistes Responsi, ad quatuor Epistolas Petri Rami contra se aeditas Tübingen: Ulrich Morhart, 1570 (VD16 S 2478).
- Organi Aristotelei Pars prima eaq[ue] analytica. Basel: Eusebius Episcopius, 1577 (VD16 S 2483).
- Tractationum physicarum et medicarum tomus unus. Frankfurt: Johann Wechel, 1585 (VD16 S 2492).
