= Fagus Factory =

Fagus Factory in Alfeld
UNESCO World Heritage Site
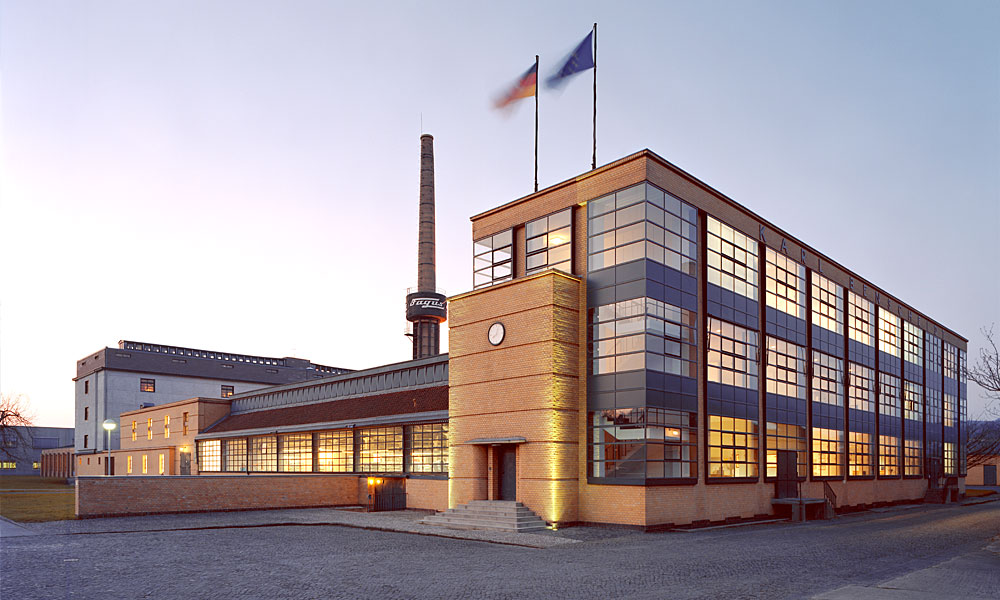

- Location within Germany Location within Lower Saxony
- Location: Alfeld, Lower Saxony, Germany
- Criteria: Cultural: (ii), (iv)
- Reference: 1368
- Inscription: 2011 (35th Session)
- Area: 1.88 ha (4.6 acres)
- Buffer zone: 18.89 ha (46.7 acres)
- Coordinates: 51°59′1″N 9°48′40″E

The Fagus Factory (German: Fagus-Werk) is a shoe last factory in Alfeld on the Leine, Lower Saxony, Germany, and serves as an important example of early modern architecture. Commissioned by owner Carl Benscheidt who wanted a radical structure to express the company's break from the past, the factory was designed by Walter Gropius and Adolf Meyer. It was constructed between 1911 and 1913, with additions and interiors completed in 1925. Because of its influence in the development of modern architecture and outstanding design, the factory has been listed as a UNESCO World Heritage Site since 2011.

== Influences ==
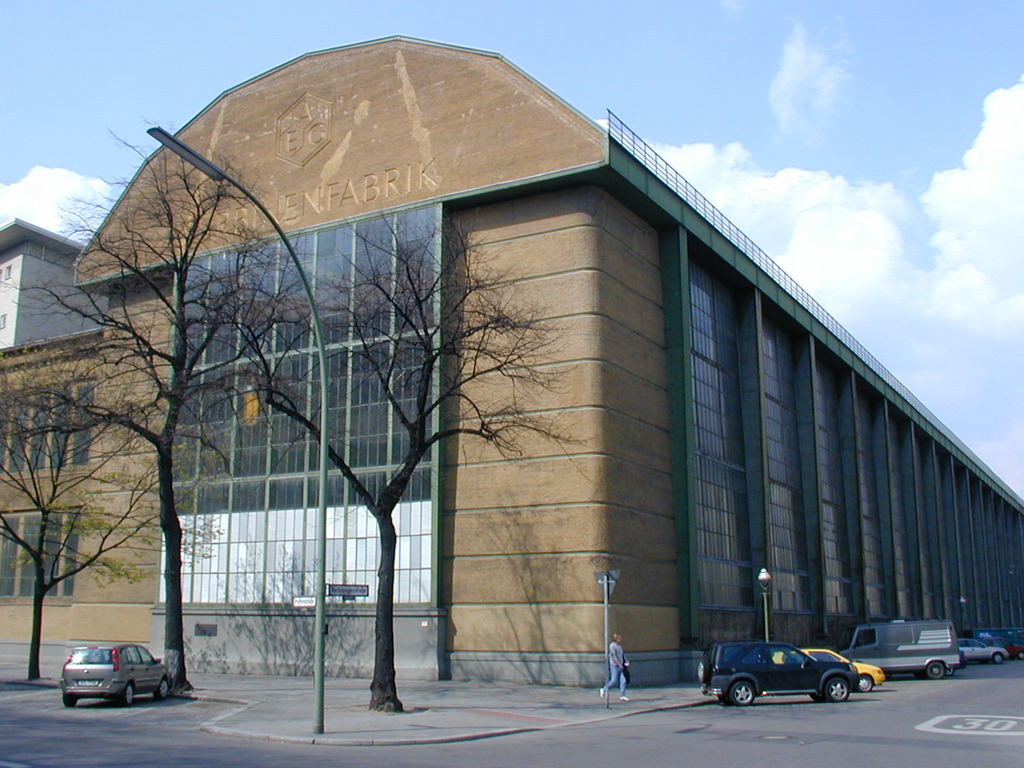
AEG turbine factory by Peter Behrens

The building that had the greatest influence on the Fagus factory design was the 1909 AEG turbine factory in Berlin, designed by Peter Behrens. Gropius and Meyer had both worked on the project and with the Fagus factory they presented their interpretation and criticism of their teacher’s work. The Fagus main building can be seen as an inversion of the AEG turbine factory. Both have corners free of supports, and glass surfaces between piers that cover the whole height of the building. However, in the AEG turbine factory the corners are covered by heavy elements that slant inside. The glass surfaces also slant inside and are recessed in relation to the piers. The load-bearing elements are attenuated and the building has an image of stability and monumentality. In the Fagus factory exactly the opposite happens; the corners are left open and the piers are recessed leaving the glass surface to the front. Gropius describes this transformation by saying,

"The role of the walls becomes restricted to that of mere screens stretched between the upright columns of the framework to keep out rain, cold and noise"

At the time of the design of the Fagus factory, Gropius was collecting photographs of industrial buildings in the USA to be used for a Deutscher Werkbund publication. The design of these American factories was also a source of inspiration for Fagus.

== Construction history ==
=== Fagus owner ===
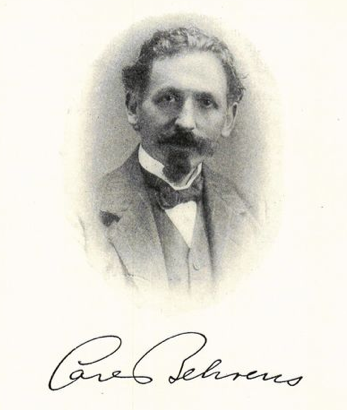
Carl Behrens, c. 1922

Carl Benscheidt (1858–1947) founded the Fagus company in 1910. He had then started by working for Arnold Rikkli, who practised naturopathic medicine, and it was there that he learned about orthopedic shoe lasts. In 1887 Benscheidt was hired by the shoe last manufacturer Carl Behrens as works manager in his factory in Alfeld. After the death of Behrens in 1896, Benscheidt became general manager of the company, which was on its way to being one of the biggest in that sector in Germany. In October 1910, he resigned from his position because of differences with Behrens's son.

=== Commission ===
After his resignation Benscheidt immediately started his own company. He established a partnership with an American company acquiring both capital and expertise. He bought the land directly opposite Behrens's factory and hired the architect Eduard Werner (1847–1923), whom he knew from an earlier renovation of the Behrens factory. Although Werner was a specialist in factory design, Benscheidt was not pleased with the outside appearance of his design. His factory was separated from Behrens’s by a train line and Benscheidt thought of the building's elevation on that side (north) as a permanent advertisement for his factory. In January 1911 he contacted Walter Gropius and offered him the job of redesigning the facades of Werner's plan. Gropius accepted the offer and a long collaboration began that continued until 1925 when the last buildings on the site were completed.

=== Construction ===
During construction, Gropius and his partner Meyer were under great pressure to keep up to the rhythm of work. Construction started in May 1911 based on Werner's plans and Benscheidt wanted the factory to be running by winter of the same year. This was achieved in great part and in 1912 Gropius and Meyer were designing the interiors of the main building and secondary smaller buildings on the site.

In order to pay the additional costs of Gropius’s design, Benscheidt and his American partners had decided on a smaller building than the one that was actually planned. By winter 1912 it was clear that the factory could not keep up with the number of orders and a major expansion was decided. This time the contract went directly to Gropius and Meyer and, from now on, they were to be the only architects of the Fagus buildings. The expansion practically doubled the surface of the buildings by adding to the street (south) side. This gave the opportunity to create a proper street elevation. Initially the main elevation was considered the north elevation that faced the railway and Behrens's factory.

Work on the expansion started in 1913 and it was barely finished when World War I broke out. During the war it was possible to do only minor works such as the power house and the chimney stack that became a prominent characteristics of the building complex.

After the war the work continued with the addition of minor buildings such as the porter's lodge and the enclosure wall. During that time the architects, in collaboration with teachers and students from the Bauhaus, designed the interiors and furniture of the main building. They also recommended to Benscheidt various designers for the publicity campaign of Fagus. From 1923 to 1925, the architects were also working on a new expansion, but this never took place. It was not until 1927 that Benscheidt wrote to Gropius to explain that all activities should stop until further notice due to financial difficulties.

=== Building ===
The building that is commonly referred to as the Fagus building is the main building. It was constructed in 1911 according to Werner's plan but with the glass facades designed by Gropius and Meyer and then expanded in 1913. The Fagus building has a 40-centimeter high, dark brick base that projects from the facade by 4 centimeters. The entrance with the clock is part of the 1913 expansion. The interiors of the building, which contained mainly offices, were finished in the mid 20s. The other two big buildings on the site are the production hall and the warehouse. Both were constructed in 1911 and expanded in 1913. The production hall is a one-storey building. It was almost invisible from the railway (north) elevation and acquired a proper facade after the expansion. The warehouse is a four-storey building with few openings. Its design followed the original plan by Werner closely, and it is left out from many of the photographs. Apart from them, the site contains various small buildings designed by Gropius and Meyer. Gropius and Meyer were able to enforce only minor changes in the overall layout of the factory complex. Overall, Werner's intended layout for the individual buildings within the complex was carried out; greater uniformity and coherence were achieved, however, through Gropius and Meyer's reductionism in form, material, and color.

=== Construction system ===
For many years, people thought that the main building was made of concrete or steel, because of its glass façade. However, during its renovation during the 80s, it became clear that this was not the case. Jürgen Götz, the engineer responsible for the renovation since 1982, describes the construction system like this:

"The main building was erected on top of a structurally stable basement with flat caps. Nonreinforced concrete (compressed concrete), mixed with pebble dashing was used for the basement walls, an unfortunate blend unable to support great individual loads. From the basement upward, the building rose in plain brickwork with reinforced wood floors. The ceilings were underpinned with a formwork shell and finished in rough-cast plaster on the services installation side. The floors were composed of planks on loose sleepers – that is, sleepers that were not fixed between the floor joists. Hence, the ceilings in the main building were not continuous shears and thus were unable to fulfill the necessary bracing function."

The same kind of misunderstanding exists about the glass façade of the building that many writers describe as a curtain wall similar to the one Gropius used for the Bauhaus Dessau building. Götz describes it like this:

"The window openings were intrados frames composed of L beams; the internal membering with horizontal and vertical muntins was differentiated in that all the verticals appeared more slender on the outside, while the horizontals appeared wider. These fames were, however, only floor-to-floor height, screwed to the building on four sides; one string course that reached across the three floors consisted, in fact, of three different sections. Along the side of the building, 3-millimetre-thick steel plates sealed the wedge between window frame and piers."

This description applies only to the main building. Götz note that the other buildings were much simpler and some of them were actually concrete and/or steel constructions.

=== Design ===
For the first time a complete facade is conceived in glass. The supporting piers are reduced to narrow mullions of brick. The corners are left without any support, yielding an unprecedented sense of openness and continuity between inside and out. The expression of the flat roof has also changed. Only in the building [the Steiner House, Vienna] by Adolf Loos which was done one year before the Fagus Factory, have we seen the same feeling for the pure cube. Another exceedingly important quality of Gropius's building is that, thanks to the large expanses of clear glass, the usual hard separation of exterior and interior is annihilated.

— Nikolaus Pevsner, Pioneers of Modern Design

Although constructed with different systems, all of the buildings on the site give a common image and appear as a unified whole. The architects achieved this by the use of some common elements in all the buildings. The first one is the use of floor-to-ceiling glass windows on steel frames that go around the corners of the buildings without a visible (most of the time without any) structural support. The other unifying element is the use of brick. All buildings have a base of about 40 cm of black brick and the rest is built of yellow bricks. The combined effect is a feeling of lightness or as Gropius called it "etherealization".

In order to enhance this feeling of lightness, Gropius and Meyer used a series of optical refinements like greater horizontal than vertical elements on the windows, longer windows on the corners and taller windows on the last floor.

The design of the building was oriented to the railroad side. Benscheidt considered that the point of view of the passengers on the trains was the one that determined the image of the building and placed great weight on the facade on that side. It was already noted by Peter Behrens (with whom Gropius and Meyer were working one year before starting work on the Fagus factory) that architects should take account of the way the speed of modern transportation affects the way architecture is perceived. Gropius had also commented the subject in his writings. According to the historian of architecture Annemarie Jaeggi these thoughts were important in the design of Fagus:

"The animated fluctuation in height, the change between horizontal structure and vertical rhythms, heavy closed volumes and light dissolved fabrics, are indicators of an approach that deliberately utilized contrasts while arriving at a harmony of opposites in a manner best expressed as a pictorial or visual structure created from the perspective of the railroad tracks."

== Gallery ==
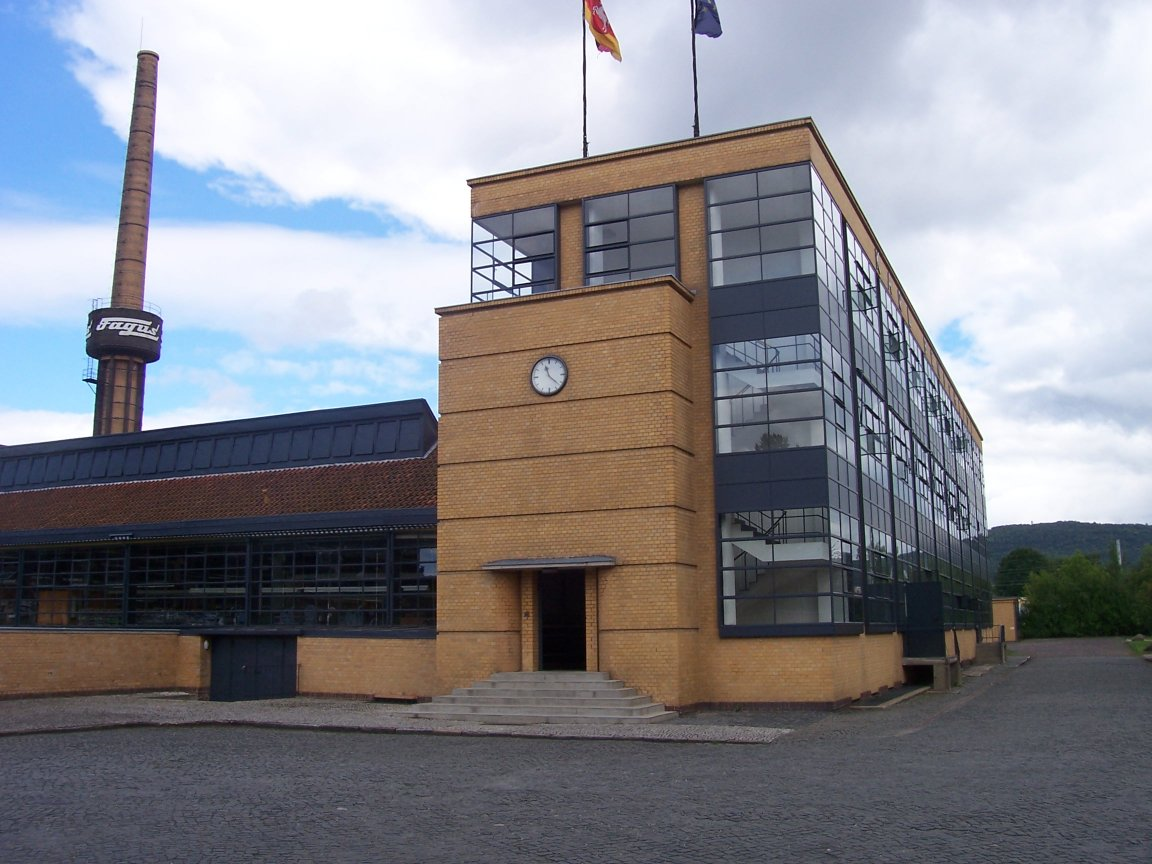

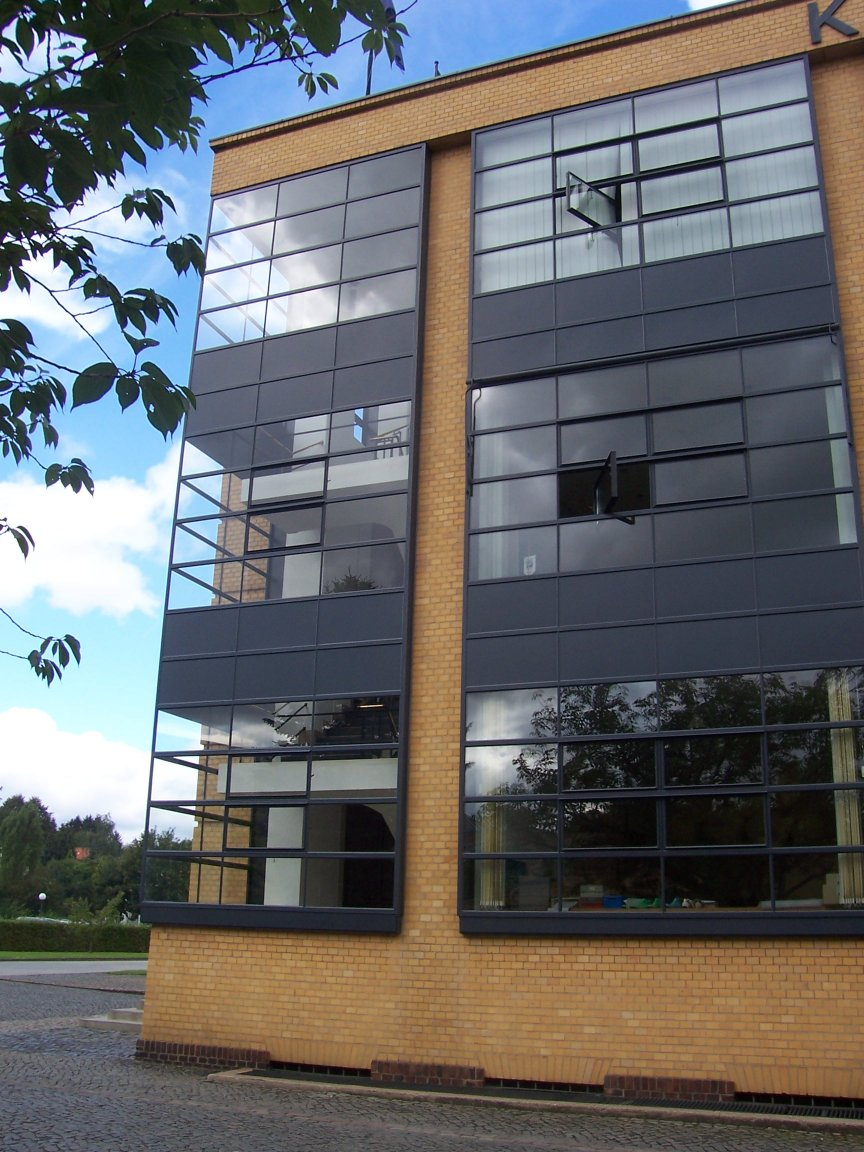

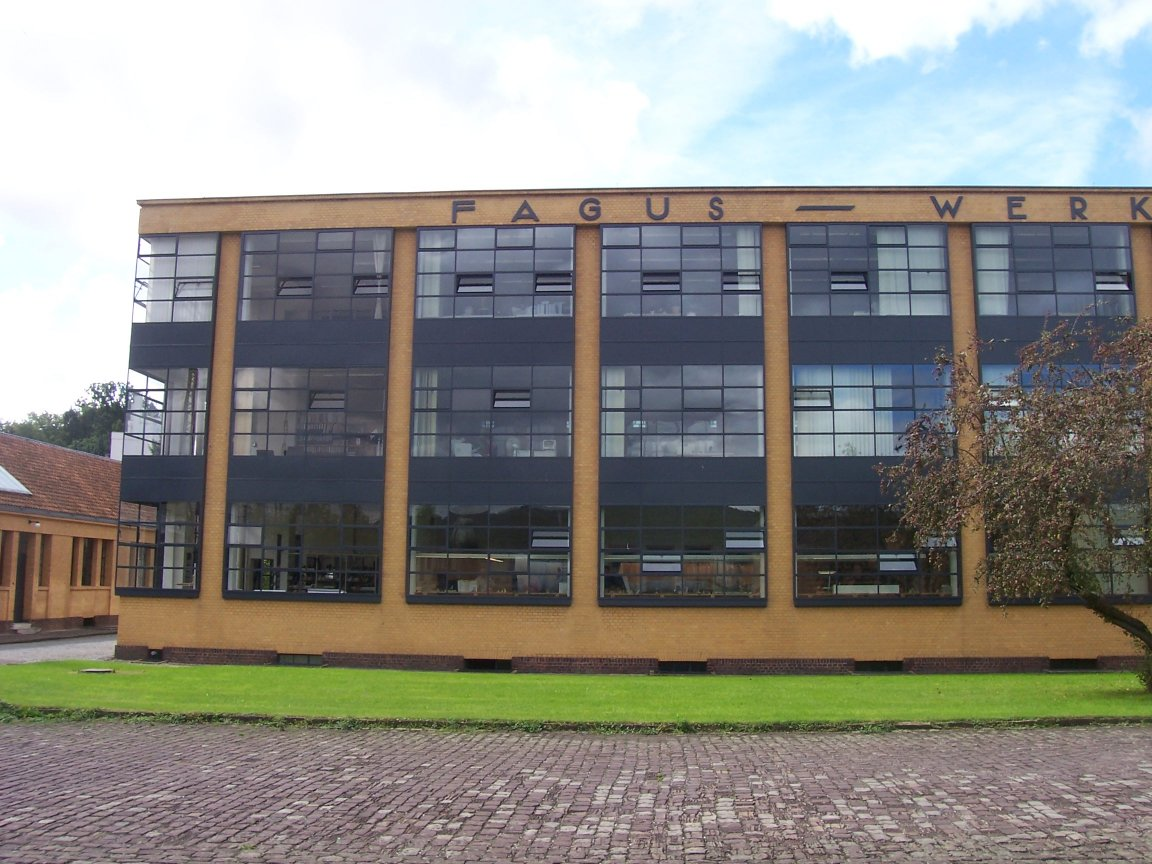
