= Lech Szczucki =

Polish historian (1933–2019)

Prof. Lech Szczucki (1933 – 19 November 2019) was a Polish historian of philosophy and culture, particularly noted since the 1960s for his work on the Polish Brethren. He was a professor emeritus of the Polish Academy of Sciences (PAN), Institute of Philosophy and Sociology. A regular member of the Warsaw Scientific Society, a member of the Society for the Promotion and Propagation of Sciences. A former editor of "Archivum", and now on the Program Committee. Prof. Szczucki was awarded the Prize of the Foundation for Polish Science for explaining the cultural ties between Central and Western Europe in a monumental edition of the correspondence of Andrzej Dudycz, the 16th-century thinker, religious reformer and diplomat.

== Selected works ==
History of philosophy and religion:

- Szczucki, Lech, ed. Filozofia i mysl spoleczna XVI wieku. Warsaw, 1978.
- Szczucki, Lech, et al., eds. Socinianism and its Role in the Culture of the XVIth to XVIIIth Centuries. Warsaw, 1983.
- Szczucki, Lech, J. Domański, and Z. Ogonowski. Zarys dziejow filozofii w Polsce: wieki XIII-XVII. Warsaw, 1989.
- Szczucki, Lech. Nonkonformisci religijni XVI i XVII wieku. Studia i szkice. Warsaw, 1993.
- Szczucki, Lech. Ket XVI. szazadi eretnek gondolkodo: Jacobus Palaeologus es Christian Franken. Budapest, 1980.
- Szczucki, Lech and Janusz Tazbir, eds. Literatura arianska w Polsce XVI wieku; antologia. Warsaw, 1959.
- Szczucki, Lech, ed. Mysl filozoficzno-religijna reformacji XVI wieku. Warsaw, 1972.
- Szczucki, Lech, ed. Nauczanie filozofii w Polsce w XV-XVIII wieku: zbior studiow. Wroclaw, 1978.
- Szczucki, Lech. W kregu myslicieli heretyckich. Wroclaw, 1972.
- ed. Szczucki, Lech. Wokol dziejow i tradycji arianizmu. Zbior studiow. Warsaw, 1971.

Editions and translations of Latin works:

- Szczucki, Lech, and Juliusz Domanski, eds. Jacobus Palaeologus. Disputatio scholastica. Utrecht, 1994.
- Szczucki, Lech, and Tiburti Szepessy, eds. Andreas Dudithius. Epistolae. 2 vols. Budapest, 1992.
- Szczucki, Lech, et al., eds. Marcin Czechowic. Rozmowy chrystyjanskie [I colloqui cristiani]. Warsaw, 1979.
- Szczucki, Lech. Marcin Czechowic, 1532–1613: Studium z dziejow antytrynitaryzmu polskiego XVI wieku. Warsaw, 1964.
- Szczucki, Lech, ed. Christophori Sandii. Bibliotheca antitrinitariorum. Varsoviae, 1967.
- Szczucki, Lech, Halina Gorska, and Krystyna Wilczewska. Cztery broszury polemiczne z poczatku XVII wieku. Warsaw, 1958.
- Szczucki, Lech and Janusz Tazbir, eds. Epitome colloquii Racoviae habiti anno 1601. Varsoviae, 1966.
- Szczucki, Lech, ed. Michal Servet, 1511–1553; wybor pism i dokumentow. Warsaw, 1967.

Articles and Conference papers:

- a large selection of articles and papers in Polish, English, German and Italian.
