= Eloy (given name) =

Eloy is a given name which may refer to:

- Saint Eligius or Eloy (588–660), Christian saint and bishop
- Eloy Alfaro (1842–1912), President of Ecuador from 1895 to 1901 and from 1906 to 1911
- Eloy Álvarez (1896–1951), Argentine actor
- Eloy d'Amerval (fl. 1455–1508), French Renaissance composer, singer, choirmaster and poet
- Eloy Azorin (born 1977), Spanish actor
- Eloy Campos (born 1942), Peruvian former footballer
- Eloy Cantú Segovia (born 1952), Mexican politician
- Eloy Casagrande (born 1991), Brazilian drummer, currently in Slipknot
- Eloy Cavazos (born 1949), Mexican matador
- Eloy Colombano (born 1983), Argentine footballer
- Eloy Edu (born 1985), footballer in Spain from Equatorial Guinea
- Eloy Fariña Núñez (1885–1929), Paraguayan poet, writer and journalist
- Eloy Fritsch (born 1968), Brazilian musician and composer of the progressive rock band Apocalypse and solo
- Eloy Fominaya (1925–2002), American composer, educator, conductor, violinist and luthier
- Eloy Gila (born 1988), Spanish footballer known simply as Eloy
- Eloy Gutiérrez Menoyo (1934–2012), Cuban guerrilla leader
- Eloy de la Iglesia (1944–2006), Spanish screenwriter and film director
- Eloy Inos (1949–2015), Governor of the Northern Mariana Islands
- Eloy Jiménez (born 1996), Dominican baseball player
- Eloy Tato Losada (1923–2022), Spanish Roman Catholic former bishop
- Eloy Matos (born 1985), Puerto Rican soccer player
- Eloy Mestrelle (died 1578), French moneyer who introduced milled coinage to England
- Eloy Olaya (born 1964), Spanish retired footballer known mononymously as Eloy
- Eloy Palacios (1847–1919), Venezuelan artist, sculptor and painter
- Eloy Pérez (born 1986), Mexican-American boxer
- Eloy Pruystinck (died 1544), Dutch radical Anabaptist leader
- Eloy Rodriguez (born 1947), Mexican-American biochemist and professor
- Eloy Rojas (born 1967), Venezuelan boxer
- Eloy Room (born 1989), Dutch-Curaçaoan football goalkeeper
- Eloy Salgado (born 1970), American retired soccer player
- Eloy Teruel (born 1982), Spanish cyclist
- Eloy G. Ureta (1892–1965), Peruvian brigadier general
- Eloy Urroz (born 1967), Mexican writer and professor
- Eloy Vargas (born 1988), Dominican basketball player

== See also ==
- Eloi (name)
