= Louis Maigret =

French grammarian

Louis Maigret (or Meigret) was the author of the Traité de la Grammaire française, which was published in 1550. This was the first grammatical description of (Middle) French.

== See also ==
- French grammar – Grammar of the French language
- Valentin Ickelshamer – German grammarian
