= Ernst Soner =

German physician (1572–1612)

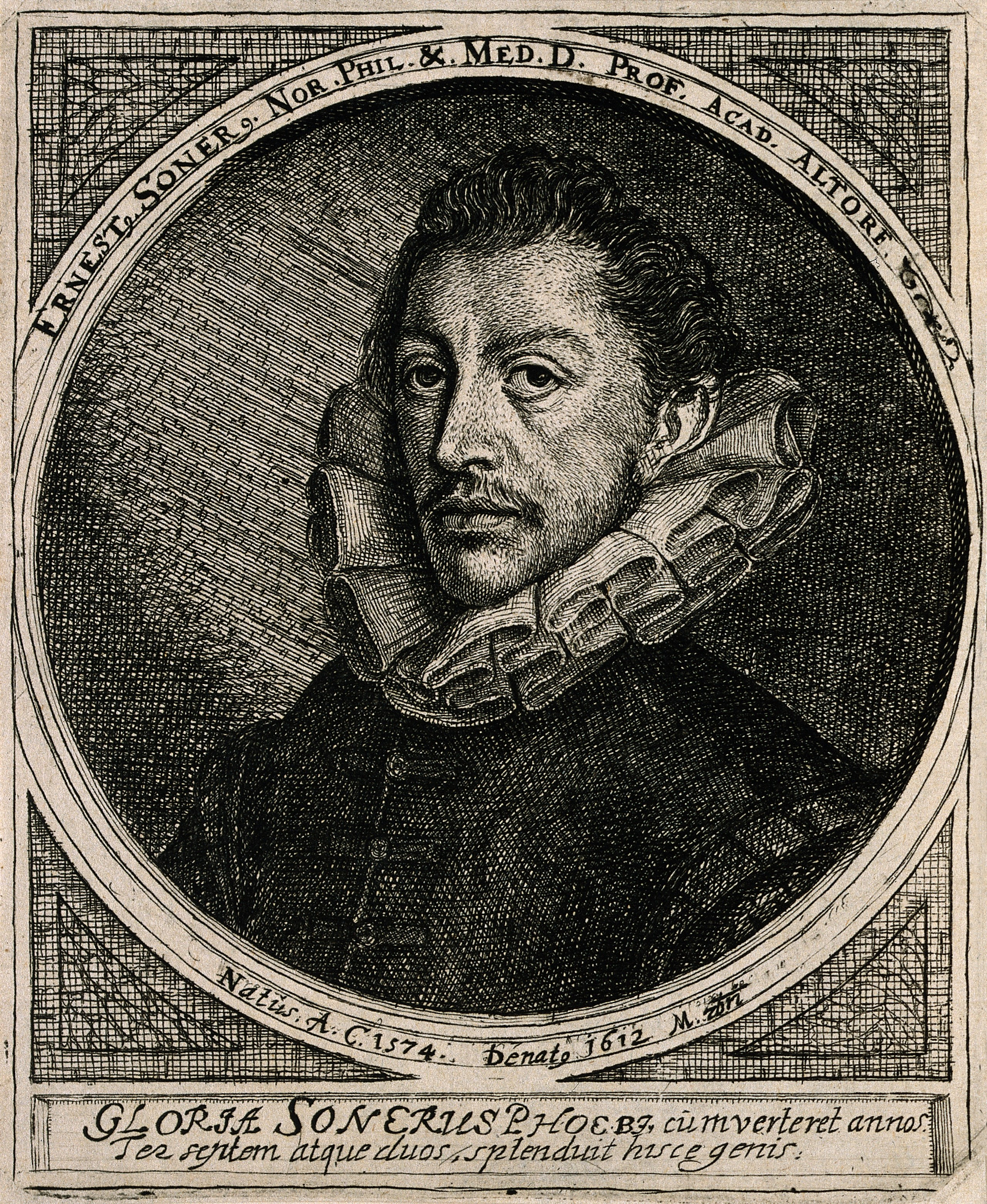
Portrait. Credit: Wellcome Library

Ernst Soner (Nuremberg, December 1572 – Altdorf bei Nürnberg, 28 September 1612) was a German doctor and herbalist.

== Life ==
Son of a businessman, he studied medicine at Altdorf University from 1589 to 1592 with Nicolaus Taurellus and Philipp Scherbe (1555–1605).

In 1598, a study trip to Leiden coincided with the missionary activity there of two Polish Socinian missionaries, Krzysztof Ostorodt (d. ca. 1611) and Andrzej Wojdowski. Soner was one of many students converted to Unitarianism. He then travelled through England, France and Italy, studying extensively in Padua, where it is assumed he studied with the "rationalist Aristotelian" Cesare Cremonini (1550–1631).

In Basel he graduated in medicine and in 1602 settled in Nuremberg to practice. In 1605 he succeed Philipp Scherbe and in 1607/1608 was made rector of the Altdorfer Akademie. He failed to save his colleague Nicolaus Taurellus from the plague.

Among his pupils were Johann Crell (from 1620 rector of the Racovian Academy), Michael Gittich, Martin Ruarus and Jonas Schlichting, influential proponents of Polish Unitarianism and the early Enlightenment.

== Works ==
- Theses de febribus. 1596.
- Theses de sanguinis missione in genere, pro Galeno. 1597.
- Disputatio inauguralis de melancholia. 1601. also in: Decas III disputationum medicarum selectarum. 1620.
- Theses medicae de sanguinis detractione per venas. 1606.
- De materia prima disputationes duae. 1607. also in J. P. Felwinger (ed.): Philosophia Altdorphina. 1644, Disp. IV und Disp. V.
- Commentarium in libros XII Metaphysicae Aristotelis, 1657
