= Eloi (name) =

Eloi is a given name and a surname, and may refer to:

== Given name ==
- Saint Eligius or Éloi (588–660), Christian saint and bishop
- Eloi Amagat (born 1985), Spanish footballer known simply as Eloi
- Eloi Baribeau (1906–1957), Canadian businessman and politician
- Éloi Guillemette (1911–1984), Canadian politician
- Éloi Johanneau (1770–1851), French philologist
- Eloi Metullus (1892–?), 1924 Olympic sport shooter for Haiti
- Éloi Meulenberg (1912–1989), Belgian road bicycle racer
- Éloi Pélissier (born 1991), French rugby league player
- Elói Schleder (born 1951), Brazilian former long-distance runner
- Elisius Eloi Sylva (1843–1919), Belgian tenor
- Eloi Tassin (1912–1977), French road bicycle racer
- Eloi Charlemagne Taupin (1767–1814), French general in the Napoleonic Wars

== Surname ==
- Armand Eloi (born 1962), Belgian actor and director
- Damien Éloi (born 1969), French table tennis player
- Wagneau Eloi (born 1973), Haitian former footballer

== See also ==
- Eloy (given name)
- Eloy (surname)
- Elois, two people with the given name
