= Provincial superior =

Head of a province of a religious order

A provincial superior is an officer of a religious institute (including religious orders) acting under the institute's superior general. A provincial superior exercises general supervision over all the members of that institute in a territorial division of the order called a province, which is similar to, but not to be confused with, an ecclesiastical province. Instead, the province under a provincial superior is one made up of particular churches or dioceses under the supervision of a metropolitan bishop. The division of a religious institute into provinces is generally along geographical lines and may consist of one or more countries, or of only a part of a country. There may be, however, one or more houses of one province situated within the physical territory of another since the jurisdiction over the individual religious is personal, rather than territorial. The title of the office is often abbreviated to Provincial.

Among the friars and Third Order Religious Sisters of the Augustinian, Carmelite and Dominican orders, the title "Prior Provincial" or Prioress Provincial is generally used. The Friars Minor, in contrast, use the title "Minister Provincial", in line with their emphasis on living as brothers to one another.

== History ==
The old orders had no provincial superiors; even when the monasteries were united to form congregations, the arch-abbot of each congregation was in the position of a superior general whose powers were limited to particular cases, almost like the powers of a metropolitan archbishop over the dioceses of his suffragans. Provincial superiors are found in the institutes of more recent formation, which began with the mendicant orders. The Holy See hesitated for a long time before allowing the division of congregations with simple vows, especially congregations of women, into different provinces as a regular institution, and some congregations have no such division.

The provincial superior is ordinarily elected by the provincial chapter, subject to confirmation by the superior general or the general chapter, depending on the regulations of the particular groups (in the Society of Jesus he is directly appointed by the father general). The "Regulations" (Normae) of 18 June 1901, vest the appointment of the provincial in the general council. The provincial superior is never elected for life, but ordinarily for three or six years. In religious orders with clerics, he is a regular prelate, and has the rank of ordinary with quasi-episcopal jurisdiction. In religious institutes whether of men or of women, the provincial superior appoints the regular confessors, calls together the provincial chapter, presides over its deliberations, and takes care that the orders of the general chapter and the superior general are properly carried out. The provincial superior is an ex officio member of the chapter. The principal duty of the provincial superior is to make regular visitations of the houses of the province in the name of the general and to report to the latter on all the religious and the property of the order; authority over the various houses and local superiors differs in different orders. The provincial superior has, in many cases, the right of appointment to the less important offices. For institutes of men, at the end of his term of office, the provincial is bound, according to the constitution Nuper of Innocent XII (23 December 1697), to prove that he has complied with all the precepts of that decree concerning Masses; if he fails to do so, he loses his right to be elected and to vote in the general chapter.

== Politics ==
A unique case was eastern Paraguay, where the Spanish colonial authorities allowed the Jesuit missionaries to establish both the Catholic faith and a unique, humane regime for the local Guarani Indian tribes, making their provincial superior the governor of the first autonomous Indian reserve, known as the (Jesuit) misiones or reducciones, until 1667, ten years after a Guarani rebellion against increased abuse by the regular colonial authorities: the territory lost its status and was divided up between Spain (then under the viceroyalty of la Plata, previously part of Upper Peru) and Portugal (Brazil).

== List of notable provincial superiors ==
- Order of St. Augustine
  - Robert Francis Prevost, who is the present Pope Leo XIV
- Society of Jesus
  - Brazil: José de Anchieta
  - Brazil: Manoel da Nóbrega
  - Philippines: James T. G. Hayes
  - Argentina: Jorge Mario Bergoglio, who became Pope Francis
- Order of Preachers
  - Albertus Magnus
- Franciscans
  - Augustine of Alfeld
