= Gerhard Westerburg =

German jurist and Protestant theologian

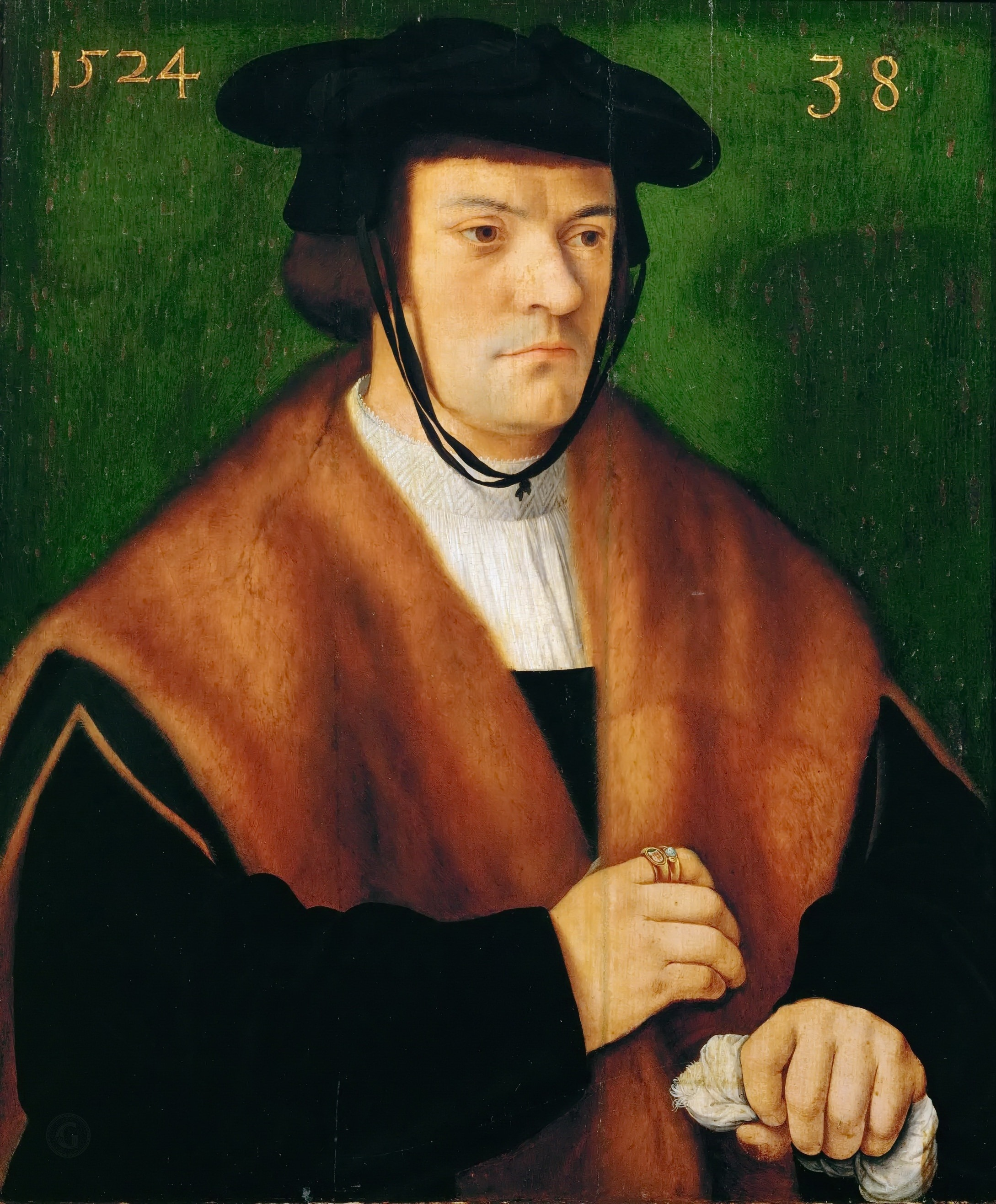
Gerhard von Westerburg, 1524 portrait

Gerhard Westerburg (c. 1490 in Cologne – 1558 in Dykhausen, Sande, Lower Saxony) was a German jurist and Anabaptist theologian. He published various pamphlets related to the Reformation in Cologne.
