= Eloy (film) =

- Produced by: Humberto Rios
- Starring: Mario Lorca
- Release date: 1969
- Running time: 90 minute
- Countries: Argentina, Chile
- Language: Spanish

Eloy is a 1969 Argentine-Chilean film directed by Humberto Ríos.

It was filmed in San Diego, Viña del Mar, Santiago de Chile and Buenos Aires.
