= István Császmai =

Hungarian Unitarian

István Császmai was a Hungarian Unitarian who took part in the debate of 1568. István Császmai is known to have published in 1567, a pamphlet with drawings intended to show the illogicality of the Trinity.
