= Stanisław Budzyński =

Stanisław Budzyński (Latin Stanislaus Budzinius) was a Polish nobleman, secretary to John a Lasco and Francis Lismaninus. His letters and writings survive in manuscript.
