= Andrzej Wojdowski =

Polish Unitarian scholar

Andrzej Wojdowski (Latin Voivodius) (Chmielnik, 1565 – 1622) was a Polish Unitarian scholar.

In 1598 he and Krzysztof Ostorodt were sent as Socinian missionaries to the Netherlands, where in Leiden they stirred up a great controversy by their success in converting the University's students to Unitarianism. Among their converts was Ernst Soner.
