= Augustine of Alfeld =

German teacher and Franciscan provincial superior

Augustine of Alfeld (1480 – c. 1535) was a teacher and Minister Provincial of the Franciscan Order in Saxony, who was opposed to Martin Luther on the question of papal authority.

== Life ==
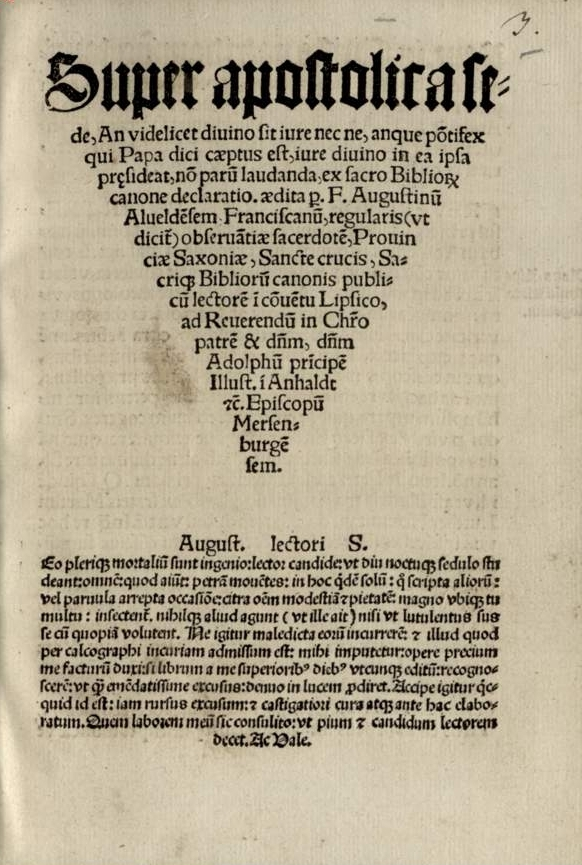
Title page of Super apostolica sede (1520)

He was born in Alfeld, near Hildesheim, and was a professor of Scripture at Leipzig in 1520. There he wrote the pamphlet against Martin Luther Super apostolica sede.

Adolf of Anhalt, the Bishop of Merseburg, in 1520 called on him to dispute the Lutherans preachers. On 20 January 1521 he presided at the public theological disputation held at Weimar, between Johannes Lang, Aegidius Mechler, and the Franciscans, on the merit of monastic vows and life; it called forth a satirical poem at the time. In 1523 he became Guardian of the friary at Halle.

Augustine served as a guardian for noble minors in 1524; and was the Minister Provincial for the Franciscan order in Saxony (1529-1532). He died before 1535.

== Notes ==
Attribution
