= SV 1858 Alfeld/Leine =

German football club

SV 1958 Alfeld/Leine
- Full name: Sportvereinigung Alfeld von 1858 e.V.
- Founded: 1858 (gymnastics); 1945 (football club)
- Ground: Hindenburgstadion
- League: Bezirksliga Hannover 3 (VII)
- 2015–16: 12th
Home colours	Away colours

SV 1958 Alfeld/Leine is a German football club from the city of Alfeld, Lower Saxony. Established on 22 July 1858 as the gymnastics club Männer Turnerverein Alfeld a football team was not formed within the club until after a 1931 merger with Sportverein Eintracht 1919 Alfeld. However, the club's first football department was short-lived and disappeared in 1936.

== History ==
In 1942 MTV joined Sonnabendriege 1896 Alfeld and Schwimmklub Poseidon Alfeld to form Verein für Leibesbungen 1858 Alfeld. On 24 October 1945, some months after the end of World War II, VfL joined Tuspo Alfeld to create Sportverein Alfeld.

The history of Tuspo Alfeld saw the bringing together of several early local sides. The club was formed in 1929 out of the merger of SV 1925 Alfeld and Turnverein Jahn 1884 Alfeld. In 1933, the Nazi regime broke up clubs with links to worker's groups as politically unpalatable and the membership of Fußballclub Union Alfeld also became part of Tuspo. Union was itself the product of an earlier merger on 20 May 1915 between FC Hertha 1911 Alfeld and FC 1912 Alfeld.

Following the war SV spent the 1947–48 season in the Landesliga Niedersachsen/Hildesheim (III) finishing 9th before settling into lower-level competition until the late 1950s. The club reclaimed its identity as SV 1858 Alfeld on 7 March 1950 and later in the year part of the membership left to establish VfL 1950 Alfeld.

SV advanced to play in the Amateurliga Niedersachsen-Ost in 1956 and played two seasons there as a lower-tier side. On 1 May 1958, the footballers left the club to establish the independent FC Alfeld which captured a Bezirksliga championship in 1976 and followed up with a cup win in 1977. They eventually returned to rejoin their parent club in 1991 and are today one of over a dozen departments within the association.

They currently compete in the Bezirksliga Hannover after relegation from the Landesliga Hannover in 2015.
