= Abbot Artemy =

Russian abbot

Abbot Artemy (Russian: игумен Троицкого монастыря Артемий; Артемий Троицкий, lit. 'Igumen Artemy of the Trinity Monastery; Artemy Troitsky') was a Russian abbot condemned for heresy in the time of Ivan the Terrible along with Matvei Bashkin and, in absentia, Feodosij Kosoj. Artemy was abbot of Trinity Lavra of St. Sergius.
