= Nicolaus Taurellus =

German philosopher (1547–1606)

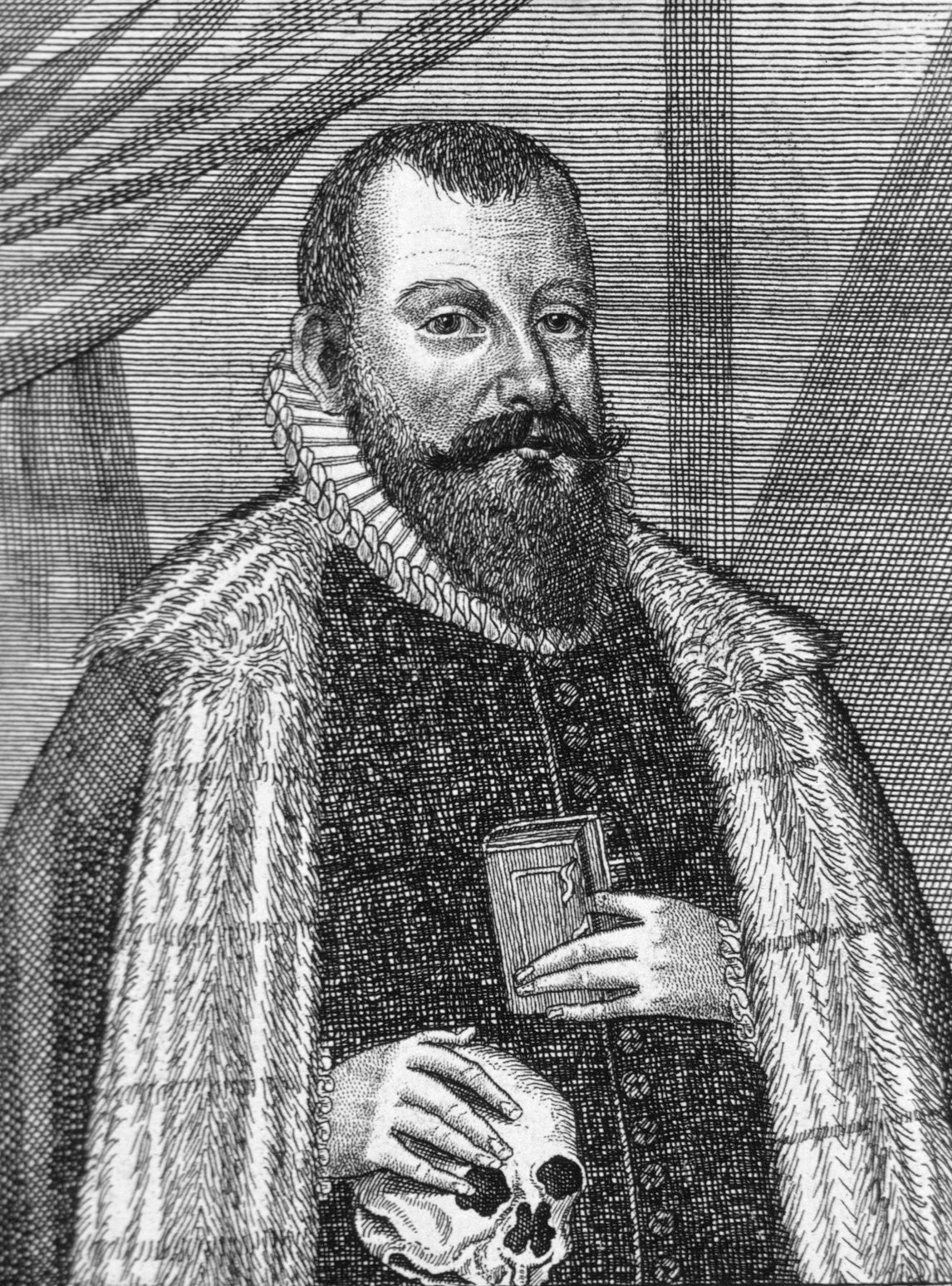
Nicolaus Taurellus

Nicolaus Taurellus (Latin, from German: Nikolaus Öchslin) (November 26, 1547 – September 28, 1606) was a German philosopher and medical academic.

== Life ==
He was born in the County of Mömpelgard, then part of the Duchy of Württemberg. With support from Duke Georg I. of Württemberg-Mömpelgard, he read theology at University of Tübingen and medicine at the University of Basel, where he lectured on physical science. He subsequently became professor of medicine at the University of Altdorf. There he died in 1606 from the plague, despite treatment by Ernst Soner.

He attacked the dominant Aristotelianism of the time, and endeavoured to construct a philosophy which should harmonize faith and knowledge, and bridge over the chasm made by the first Renaissance writers who followed Pomponazzi. Scholasticism he condemned on account of its unquestioning submission to Aristotle. Taurellus maintained the necessity of going back to Christianity itself, as at once the superstructure and the justification of philosophy.

His chief works were Philosophiae Triumphus (1573); Synopsis Metaphysicae Aristolelis (1596); De Rerum Aeternitate (1604); and a treatise written in criticism of Caesalpinus entitled Caesae Alpes (1597). See Schmid-Schwarzenburg, Nicolaus Taurellus (1860 and 1864).

== Works ==
- Theses Philosophicae, De Ortu Rationalis Animae. Nürnberg: Kauffmann, 1596. at Herzog August Bibliothek Wolfenbüttel
- Philosophiae triumphus seu metaphysica philosophandi methodus. Basel 1573.
- Medicae praedictionis methodus. Frankfurt, 1581.
- Carmina Funebria, Quae Magnorum Aliquot, Clarorumque virorum felici memoriae dicavit. Nürnberg: Lochner, 1602. at Universität Mannheim
- Emblemata Physico-Ethica, Hoc Est: naturae morum moderatricis picta præcepta. Nürnberg: Halbmayer, 1617. Mikrofiche-Ausgabe Zug: IDC, 1981.
- Tavrellvs Defensvs : H. E. Iac. Wilh. Feverlini ... Dissertatio Apologetica Pro Nic. Tavrello ... Atheismi Et Deismi Iniuste Accusato. Nürnberg: Schmid, 1734. CD-ROM-Ausgabe, Mannheim: Univ.-Bibl., 2007 (Zusammen mit Jakob Wilhelm Feuerlein).

== Notes ==
Attribution:
