= György Válaszúti =

György Válaszúti was a Hungarian Unitarian. In the Disputation of Pécs 1588, he debated for the Unitarian side using the ideas of Sommer.
