= Elias Gczmidele =

Polish Protestant (floruit 1570s)

Elias Gczmidele (fl. 1570s) was a Polish Protestant expelled from the Hungarian Calvinist community in Cluj-Napoca in 1570. He is known only for his letter of appeal from Kraków to Gáspár Heltai in February 1571, preserved in the Cluj city archives. This uncharacteristic intolerant incident may be because of his view of not resisting the Ottoman Empire as "the greatest power in the world."
