= Jan Kalenec =

Jan Kalenec (1490–1546) was a Prague cutler who took up the leadership of the Amosites, a radical branch of the Czech Brethren after the death of their elderly figurehead Amos. They were known as the malá stránka, "small party" or "minor unity," of the brethren.
