= Lukács Egri =

German-Hungarian Unitarian

Lukács Egri (b. Wittenberg) was a German-Hungarian Unitarian who published De controversis fidei questionibus adversus dogmata Calvini… in 1567.

His teaching was condemned by Confessio Cassoviensis, adopted in Košice in 1568.
