= Christian Entfelder =

Christian Entfelder (before 1526 – after 1544) was a Moravian Anabaptist. A pupil of Hans Denck, friend of Balthasar Hubmaier and Johannes Bünderlin, Entfelder preached from before 1526 in Moravia. When Moravia became part of the Austrian Empire in 1529 he went to Strasbourg where he published "Von warer Gotseligkait." He was appointed ducal counsellor at the court of Albrecht of Prussia from 1544, after which no trace is found.
