= Simone Simoni =

Italian philosopher and physician

Simone Simoni (1532, Lucca - 1602, Kraków) was an Italian philosopher and physician.

After graduating in medicine from the University of Padua, Simoni moved to Geneva, where he became professor of philosophy and engaged in controversy with Jakob Schegk. Expelled by the city for his heretical views, he moved to Paris and subsequently to Leipzig (where he was accused of Arianism in 1575) and Heidelberg (where he was forced to leave in 1579). In 1581, he became court physician to Emperor Rudolf II in Prague; there were unconfirmed rumours that he had converted to Catholicism.

Simoni moved on to Poland to become court physician to Stephen Báthory. When the King died in 1586, Simoni was accused of having prescribed the wrong treatment and, after a bitter dispute, his rival Nicholas Buccella was appointed personal physician to the new king Sigismund III Vasa. SImoni moved to Moravia, where he spent the rest of his life.

Simoni wrote a commentary on Aristotle's De Sensu. He gave a notably crisp formulation to the principle that physicians should undergo preliminary preparation in Aristotelian natural philosophy: Ubi desinit physicus, ibi medicus incipit [The physician starts where the natural philosopher leaves off].

== Works ==
- Artificiosa curandae pestis methodus, 1576
