= Jan Dubčanský of Zdenín =

Moravian nobleman

Jan Dubčanský of Zdenín (Czech: Jan Dubčanský ze Zdenína; 1490–1543) was a Moravian nobleman, printer of the first Czech language book in Moravia, and founder of the Zwinglian but pacifist Habrovany Brethren, later led by Matěj Poustevník.
