= Beneš Optát =

Czech priest and linguist

Václav Beneš Optát (died 1559) was a Czech Utraquist Hussite priest. In 1533 he published as co-author with Petr Gzel of Prague the first Czech Grammar (Grammatika česká v dvojí stránce). In the same year he published his Czech translation of the New Testament based on Erasmus' edition.
