= Krzysztof Ostorodt =

Krzysztof Ostorodt (German Christopher Ostorod) (Goslar c1560- Danzig 1611) was a Polish Unitarian teacher and missionary to the Netherlands.

In 1598 he was sent on a missionary trip to Leiden with Andrzej Wojdowski. Among those they converted was the German herbalist Ernst Soner.

Valentinus Smalcius was his pupil and friend in later life, and wrote his obituary.
