= Feodosy Kosoy =

Feodosy Kosoy, "Feodosy the Squint-Eyed" (Феодосий Косой) (fl. 1550s) was a Russian serf-monk in the time of Ivan the Terrible. He preached full equality, rejecting church hierarchy, the Trinity, the sacraments, icons, and churches. His preaching was condemned along with that Matvei Bashkin and the Abbot Artemy in 1553. He fled to the safety of Lithuania and the community of Polish Brethren.
