= Jacques de Bourgogne =

Flemish nobleman

Jacques de Bourgogne, seigneur de Fallais (c. 1505 – c. 1562), was a Flemish nobleman and initial supporter of Calvin. He is known for his letter L'Excuse de Noble Seigneur Jacques de Bourgogne, Seigneur de Falais Et de Bredam.

== Early life ==
Burgundy was the eldest son of Karel I "Charles" of Burgundy, Heer van Bredam (c. 1480–1538), and Marguerite de Barbançon de Werchin

His paternal grandparents were Baudouin of Burgundy (an illegitimate son of Philip the Good, Duke of Burgundy) and the Castilian noblewoman, Marina Maurice Manuel de Villena (a daughter of Juan Manuel de la Cerda, Lord of Belmonte). His maternal grandparents were Nicolas de Barbançon, Lord of Werchin, and Yolande de Luxembourg (a daughter of Jacques de Luxembourg, Seigneur de Richebourg).

== Career ==
Burgundy moved from Fallais to Cologne at the behest of John Calvin between 14 October 1543 and 24 June 1544.

In 1545, the Court of Mechelen, by order of Emperor Charles V, accused him of heresy and declared him forfeit of all his possessions. At the time, Jacques was already living in Strasbourg and intended to move to Geneva, but his plan was temporarily postponed by the outbreak of the Plague there.

He finally moved to Geneva, via Basel, in June 1548, with at least five family members and an entourage. He lived in Geneva for three to four years with his family and a few friends at the Château de Veigy in Veigy (which today is in France bordering the Swiss Canton of Geneva and Lake Geneva).

== Personal life ==
Burgundy was married to Jolente "Yolande" van Brederode (1525–1553), a daughter of Walraven II, Lord of Brederode and Vianen, Bailiff of Utrecht and Anna van Geldern Countess of Neuenahr. Before her death in February 1553 in Vaud, they were the parents of three children, who all died young.

He remarried to Elisabeth van Reimerswaal (1525–1570), a daughter of Adriaan van Reimerswaal, Heer van Lodijk and Joanna van Glymen. Together, they were the parents of Jeanne Isabelle de Bourgogne (b. 1555) and Zoon van Jacob de Bourgogne.

Burgundy died at Baudour in the Hainaut Province in c. 1562.
