= Matěj Poustevník =

Matěj Poustevník (fl. 1520s) was a radical Anabaptist lay preacher from Žatec. Poustevník was with Jan Dubčanský ze Zdenína a co-founder of the pacifist Moravian Habrovanite Brethren.
