= Valentin Ickelshamer =

German grammarian

Valentin Ickelsamer (also spelled Ickelshamer, Ikelschamer, Ikelsheimer, Eckelsheimer, Ikkersamer, Becklersheimer, Zangsthamer; c.1500 – 1547) or Valentinus Ickelschamer was a German grammarian.

Ickelshamer was born at Rothenburg ob der Tauber, where he was schoolmaster. He encouraged all Bavarians to read the Bible for themselves, and published an appeal to Luther. He died at Augsburg.

== Selected works ==
- Die rechte Weis, auffs kürtzist lesen zu lernen, vermutlich Erfurt 1527; 2., vermehrte Auflage Marburg 1534. In: Johannes Müller: Quellenschriften und Geschichte des deutschsprachlichen Unterrichts bis zur Mitte des 16. Jahrhunderts. Thienemann's Hofbuchhandlung, Gotha 1882, S. 52-64. Reprint Olms, Hildesheim/New York 1969. Auch in: Heinrich Fechner (Hrsg.): Vier seltene Schriften des sechzehnten Jahrhunderts mit einer bisher ungedruckten Abhandlung über Valentinus Ickelsamer von Friedrich Ludwig Karl Weigand. Wiegand und Grieben, Berlin 1882. Reprint Olms, Hildesheim/New York 1972.
- Ein Teutsche Grammatica, verschiedene Ausgaben, ohne Ort, ohne Jahr; datiert: Ausgabe Nürnberg 1537 (zur phonetischen Lautanalyse) In: Johannes Müller: Quellenschriften und Geschichte des deutschsprachlichen Unterrichts bis zur Mitte des 16. Jahrhunderts. Thienemann's Hofbuchhandlung, Gotha 1882, S. 120-159. Reprint Olms, Hildesheim/New York 1969. (Das Reprint gibt eine der beiden undatierten Ausgaben wieder.)

== See also ==
- Louis Maigret – French grammarian
