= Pál Karádi =

Pál Karádi (1523 – c. 1590) was a Hungarian Unitarian bishop, writer and printer. He had been secretary at the Torda dispute. Karádi was one of the millenarians among the Hungarian Unitarian church. His press also printed theatrical works.
