= Eloy (surname) =

Eloy is a surname. Notable people with the surname include:

- Albert Éloy-Vincent, (1868–1945), French journalist and painter
- Albert Eloy (1892–1947), French footballer
- Albert Eloy (1927–2008), French footballer
- Jean-Claude Éloy (1938–2025), French composer
- Mário Eloy (1900–1951), Portuguese expressionist painter

== See also ==
- Eloi (name)
