= Alfeld =

- Town
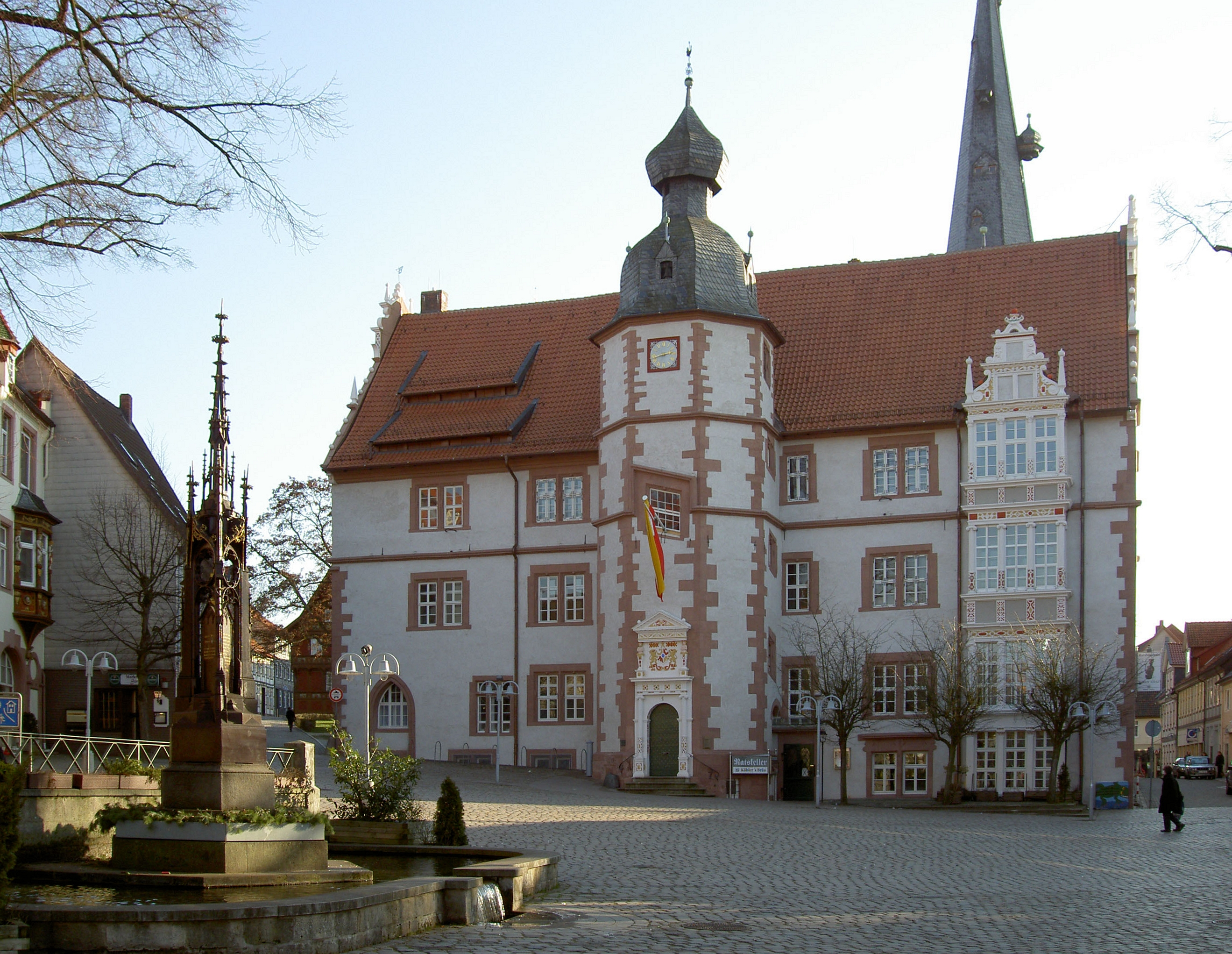
- Alfeld town hall, behind St. Nicolai

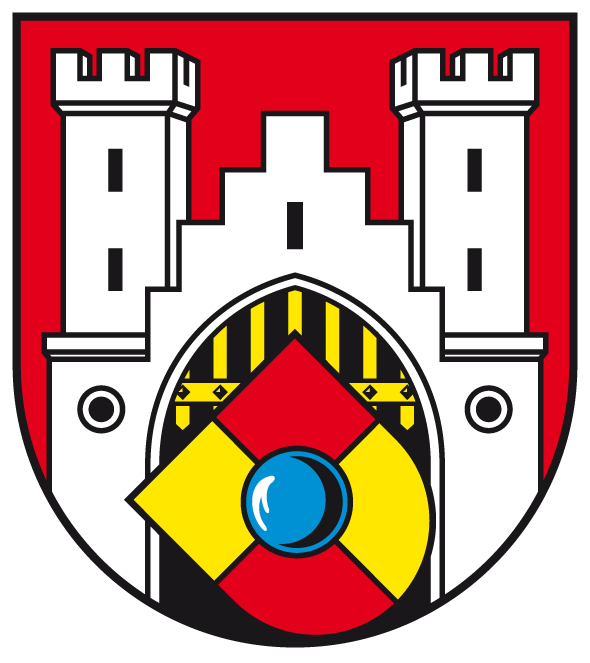
- Coat of arms

- Location of Alfeld within Hildesheim district
- Interactive map of Alfeld
- Location within Germany Location within Lower Saxony
- Coordinates: 51°59′19″N 9°49′37″E
- Country: Germany
- State: Lower Saxony
- District: Hildesheim

Government
  - Mayor (2021–26): Bernd Beushausen (SPD)

Area
  - Total: 72.88 km^{2} (28.14 sq mi)
- Elevation: 145 m (476 ft)

Population (2025-12-31)
  - Total: 17,991
  - Density: 246.9/km^{2} (639.4/sq mi)
- Time zone: UTC+01:00 (CET)
  - Summer (DST): UTC+02:00 (CEST)
- Postal codes: 31061
- Dialling codes: 05181
- Vehicle registration: HI, ALF
- Website: www.alfeld.de

Alfeld (Leine) (German pronunciation: [ˈalfɛlt]) is a town in the state of Lower Saxony, Germany. Located on the Leine river and situated approximately 20 km southwest of Hildesheim, it is the second biggest city in the district of Hildesheim in southern Lower Saxony and part of the Metropolitan region Hannover-Braunschweig-Göttingen-Wolfsburg. Alfeld is a member of the Leinebergland region and on the German Timber-Frame Road. With the Fagus Factory, Alfeld became a UNESCO World Heritage Site in 2011.

== History ==
The town was founded before 1214, with the name Alvelde recorded in 1214, 1221, and 1233. The toponymic element "-feld" means "open area", "an undeveloped, open field", or "an untilled field". "Al-" likely derives from the Indoeuropean root "el-/ol-" meaning "water", "damp", or "flowing".

In 1426, Alfeld joined the Saxon League of Towns, thus becoming an indirect member of the Hanseatic League. The town was one of the smallest cities in the Hanseatic League, but had become prosperous in the fourteenth and fifteenth centuries through its trade in beer, hops, linen, and yarn.

Alfeld originally belonged to the Diocese of Hildesheim, but was transferred to the Principality of Brunswick-Wolfenbüttel after the Hildesheim Diocesan Feud (1519-1523). In retrospect, this Brunswick period constituted Alfeld's Golden Age, its economy and culture flourishing before the Thirty Years' War.

== Main Sights ==
Sights in Alfeld include the town hall (1586) with its octagonal tower, the twin-spired church of Saint Nicolai (part of the Evangelical-Lutheran Church of Hanover), the Fillerturm (a medieval watchtower), and the Fagus Factory of 1911, a fine example of early modernist architecture by Walter Gropius. More famous are the Seven Hills (German: Sieben Berge) in the north and the Lippoldshöhle ("Lippold's cave"), where a legendary robber-knight is said to have lived.

== Culture ==
The assertion that the popular fairy tale of Snow White and the Seven Dwarfs was born in Alfeld is likely to be false. Even though the miners who mined ore in the Seven Mountains believed in the existence of dwarfs, it is more likely that the cradle of the fairy tale is to be found in France. The version the brothers Grimm heard and wrote down, as they travelled through the Seven Mountains, on the so-called Märchenstrasse (Street of Fairytales) is just one of many.

The most popular beer in Alfeld is Einbecker Brauherrn, from Einbeck, about 12 kilometers or so, away, south of Alfeld. Veltins Pilsner, Flensberger Pils and Gottinger Pils are also popular beers in Alfeld.

== Economy ==
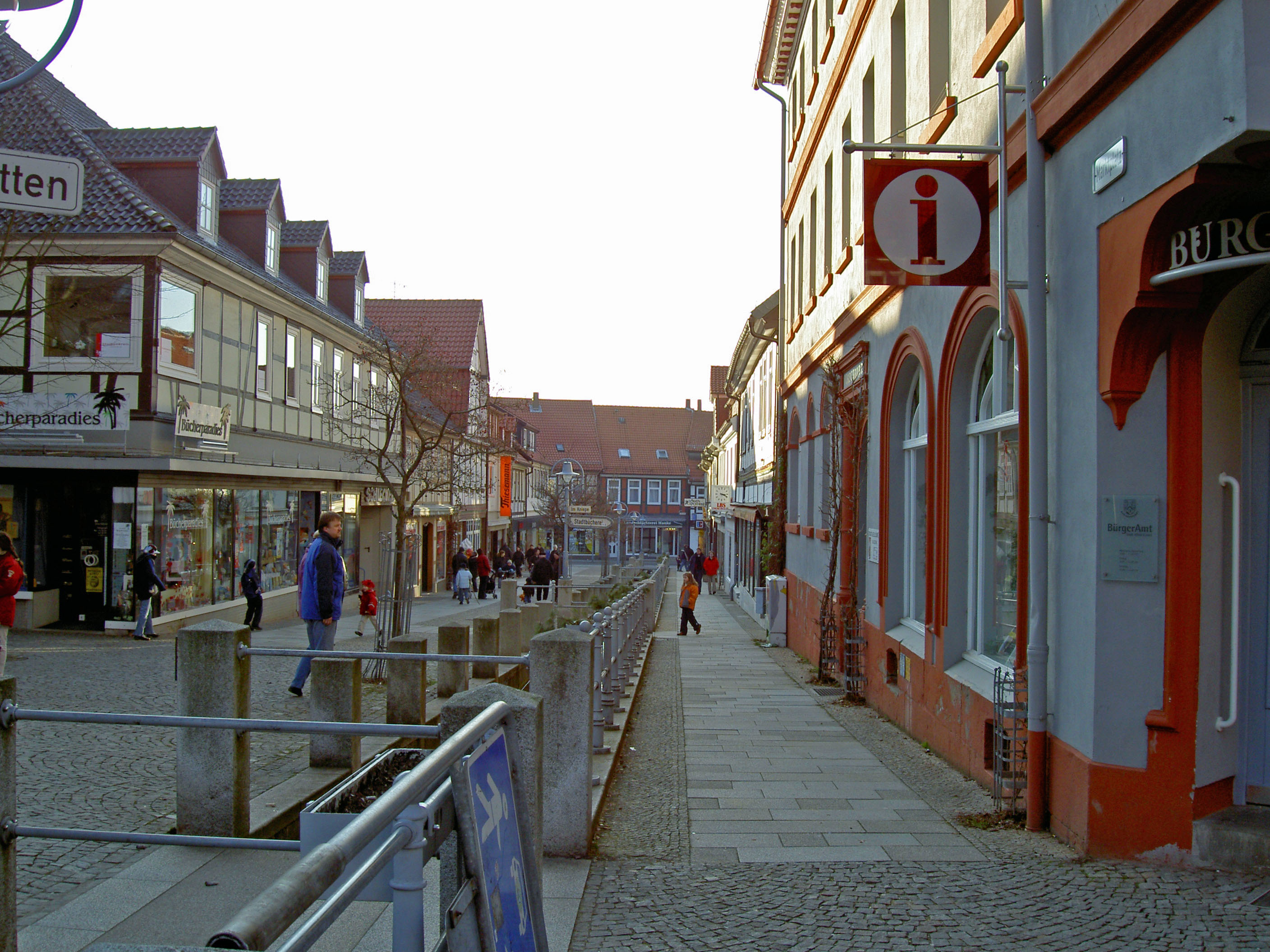
Marktstraße

The biggest employer of the city is the SAPPI (South African Pulp and Paper Industry) factory with its big chimney, which has become one of Alfeld's landmarks. Even more famous than SAPPI is the Fagus Werk, rebuilt in 1910-1915 after the blueprints of architect Walter-Gropius, what is said to be trend-setting for modern architecture.

== Popular culture ==
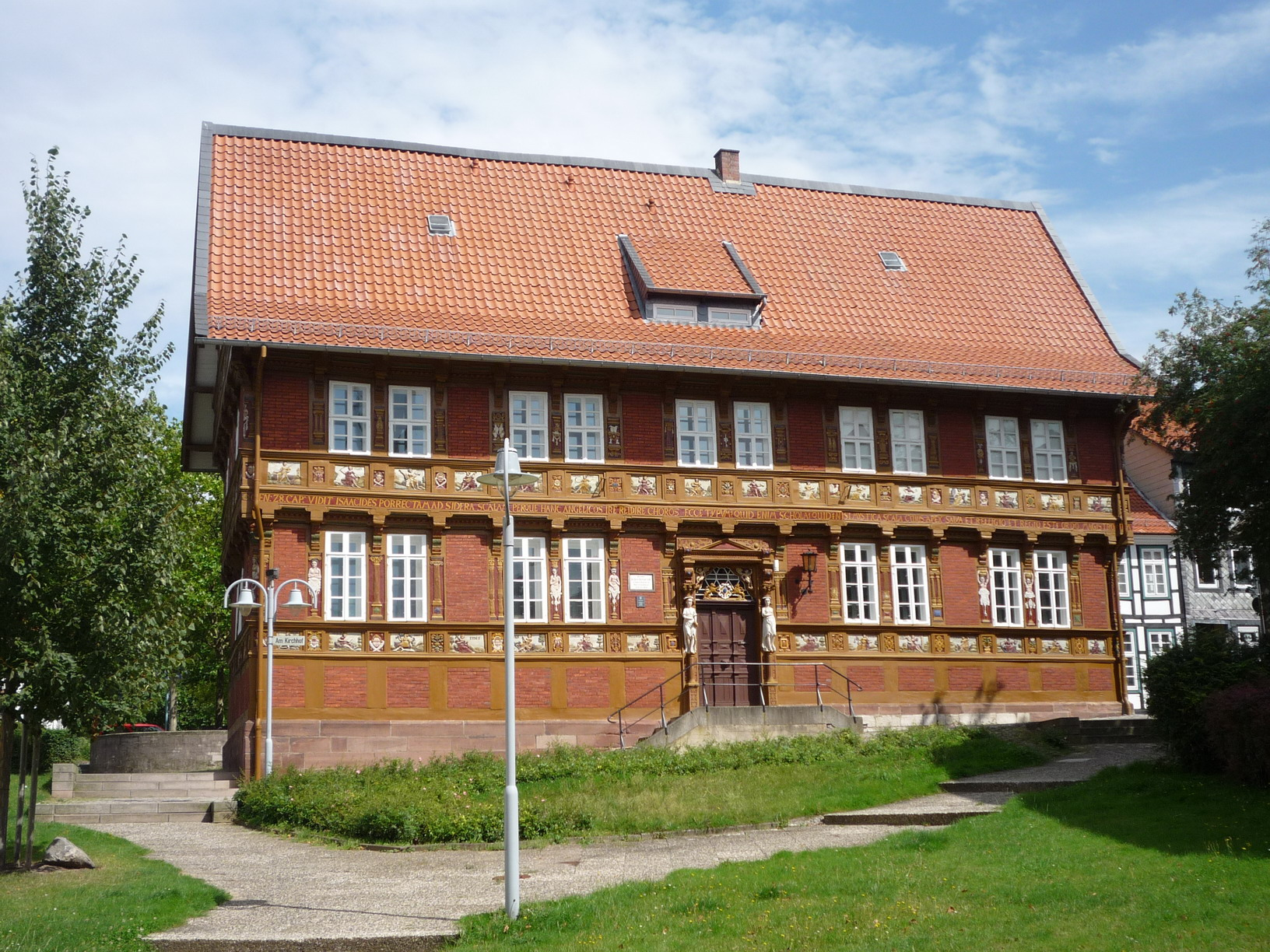
Latin school, today museum

Alfeld is a strategically important town fought over repeatedly by NATO and the Soviet Red Army forces in Tom Clancy's novel Red Storm Rising, due to the bridges over the Leine River.

== International relations ==
Alfeld is twinned with:

- Wakefield, United Kingdom

== Notable people ==
- Augustine of Alfeld (1480–1535), Franciscan and controversial theologian
- Walter Kappe (1905–1944), German Nazi, who, as an emigrant in the US in the 1930s, created propaganda and committed espionage in service of Nazism
- Uwe Schmidt (born 1954), German politician (SPD) and since July 2009, head of the district Kassel
- Albrecht von Goertz (1914–2006), German industrial designer
- Zbigniew Żedzicki (born 1945), Polish wrestler

== See also ==
- Metropolitan region Hannover-Braunschweig-Göttingen-Wolfsburg
- Alfeld Sports Club SVA
