= Elois =

Elois is a given name. Notable people with the name include:

- Elois Grooms (born 1953), American football player
- Elois Jenssen (1922–2004), American film and television costume designer

== See also ==
- Eloise (given name)
- Lois
