= Eligius Pruystinck =

Dutch Anabaptist, fl. 1525–1544

- Looi de Schaliedekker
- Born: 1525; Antwerp, Duchy of Brabant
- Died: 24 October 1544

Eligius Pruystinck or in Dutch: Looi de Schaliedekker, lit. 'Eloy the Slater' (fl. 1525 – 24 October 1544), was a slater from Antwerp in the Duchy of Brabant who became the leader of a radical Protestant faction named Loists (Loïsten in Dutch) after him.

Pruystinck was likely born a poor man in Antwerp and remained poor through his life, leaving nothing after his death in 1544. He had contact with David Joris, probably before 1525, but his movement was not Anabaptist. In March 1525, Pruystinck visited Melanchthon and Luther in Wittenberg. In a letter he wrote immediately afterwards, Luther warned the Protestant community at Antwerp against him (and "blustering and noisy spirits" in general) by summarizing Pruystinck's doctrines as: every man possesses faith and the Holy Spirit, where the first is the desire to treat one's neighbor as oneself and the second is human reason and intelligence; all souls enjoy eternal life; only the flesh and not the spirit suffers hell; no sin has been committed when not acting on an evil thought and small children cannot sin. These doctrines have been compared to those of the much older Brethren of the Free Spirit and Beghards and the 15th-century Homines Intelligentiae of the Low Countries, and Pruystinck's movement was a form of Panentheism. The notion of radicalism was fueled by their rejection of religious marriage, lent, praying and other basic church regulations.

Called before the Inquisition of Antwerp in January 1526, Pruystinck and his followers recanted and were sentenced to public penance. They were let free on orders of Mary of Austria, Governor of the Habsburg Netherlands. Despite the recantation, his teaching spread through the Low Countries in the following years. In 1535 he met Christophe Hérault, a French Lutheran who had fled from Paris to Antwerp and who became a follower. While a pauper himself, his movement attracted many followers amongst merchants, rich citizens and even nobility. Pruystinck's teachings were written down, probably by Dominicus van Oucle, but this writing is lost. On July 14, 1544, Hérault and Pruystinck were arrested and tortured on accusation of interactions with David Joris and other Anabaptists. Many other Loists were captured, though quite a few managed to escape to England and Germany. In September and October of that year Dominicus van Oucle committed suicide in prison and Hérault and some other leaders were decapitated. Pruystinck himself was brought back to Antwerp, and after a sentencing on October 24, 1544, he was burned at the stake outside the city. It is unknown if he recanted before he died.
