= Oswald Glaidt =

German Anabaptist and Sabbatarian

Oswald Glait (Cham 1490 – Vienna 1546) was a German Anabaptist and Sabbatarian. Originally a follower of Balthasar Hubmaier, in 1527 in the Nikolsburg dispute he sided with the pacifist position of Hans Hut. He then appears in Silesia, along with Andreas Fischer, as a leader of an Anabaptist group there. He penned a booklet, Vom Sabbat, advocating the (re)institution of Saturday/Sabbath keeping as a Christian practice, thus restoring what Glaidt argued had been the original practice of the Apostolic church of the New Testament. There is also good evidence in this writing (lost, but carefully reconstructed by Daniel Liechty based on Caspar Schwenckfeldt's refutation of it) that Glaidt strongly believed that Christ's Second Coming was to occur in the very near future (this shows the extent of Hans Hut's influence on Glaidt at this time). Glaidt appears later in the sources attached to the nascent Hutterite group in Moravia. He was arrested and imprisoned in Vienna in 1545, then taken out at night and drowned in autumn 1546.

== See also ==
- Andreas Fischer
- Paul Fagius
