= Marcin Czechowic =

Martin Czechowic (or Marcin Czechowic) (c.1532–1613) was a Polish Socinian (Unitarian) minister, Protestant reformer, theologian and writer.

== Life ==
Born in Zbąszyń on the German border, Czechowic received a humanistic education in Poznań and at the University of Leipzig (1554).

He lived at a time when religious unrest was prevalent in Poland. Numerous religious sects arose, varying from the old Catholicism and the new Reformation to sects which rejected the Trinity and denied the divinity of Jesus. The members of the sect which professed disbelief in the Trinity were called Unitarians, and the most radical among them were called by their opponents "Half Jews" or "semi-judaizers". The religious dissension and constant disputes which arose in consequence led to a number of Jews taking part in these disputations.

=== Conversion to Calvinism ===
Like many of his era, Martin Czechowic's religious life was marked by gradual rather than sudden changes in his religious views. He was originally a Roman Catholic priest in Kórnik until 1555, when he became a member of the Moravian Brethren in Vilna where he had gone to Lithuania to work for the Radziwiłł family. Mikołaj "the Black" Radziwiłł sent him on a fruitless mission to Geneva to convert Calvin and the Reformers but it was Czechowic who adopted Lutheranism and eventually, Calvinism, himself. Later he would support anabaptist and unitarian views.

=== Conversion to the Polish Brethren ===
Twenty years later Czechowic had moved from the Calvinist Ecclesia Major to the Unitarian Ecclesia Minor, or Polish Brethren. In doing so he adopted what was later to be known as the "Socinian" position, between Arianism, which taught the pre-existence of Christ and full Unitarianism which denied the virgin birth. Czechowic believed that Jesus was human, but because he was born without sin, it was right to worship him.

Czechowic was in his mid-forties, of the same generation as Fausto Sozzini, Georg Schomann, Gregory Pauli, Krzysztof Morsztyn Sr., Pierre Statorius. He has been described as the "Pope" of the Polish brethren, though this is something of an exaggeration - it is perhaps more that as a native Pole among so many German, Italian and French exiles he had more traction within the local brotherhood.

He adopted unconditional pacifism and opposed infant baptism and, because of the political obligations, the amassing of private property. His attitude to Eve's sin was relatively progressive for the period. Czechowic, like most of the Polish Brethren, was not supportive of the personal idea of Fausto Sozzini that baptism is not necessary for individuals who believe and who have grown up in Christianity, but Sozzini did not push his idea, and was generally accepted in the movement that later became known by his name.

=== Polish Bible translation ===
Prior to the 1565 break between the Calvinist and Radical Arian wings of the Reformed Church there had been cooperation on the six years 1557-1563 at the "Sarmatian Athens" at Pińczów, to produce the Biblia Brzeska. However now the Polish Brethren felt that this Bible contained too many readings supportive of orthodox Calvinist teaching on infant baptism, heaven and hell, immortality of the soul and the doctrine of the Trinity.

Czechowic was at first involved with Symon Budny in a Socinian translation of biblical scriptures, but later had to part ways with Budny over 2 issues: Budny's sceptical attitude to the Greek text as the basis of a translation - preferring Jewish and Hebrew readings, and Budny's support of Jacobus Palaeologus for the right of the Christian to use force, where Czechowic sided with the conscientious objection ideals of Gregory Pauli of Brzeziny and Fausto Sozzini. Budny produced his Polish versions 1572, 1574, 1589, Czechowic a Polish version 1577.

Czechowic got caught up in a controversy over scriptural translation and interpretation with his contemporary Jakub Wujek, a Jesuit and the translator of the first Catholic Polish version of the Bible. Wujek freely took from the Brzeska, Budny and Czechowic versions, providing notes of "teachings and warnings" where he considered them heretical. In reply Czechowic published Plaster for a publication of the New Testament by Father Jakub Wujek. Which took Wujek to task from the point of view of biblical scholarship, and then made a blow-by-blow analysis of the Jesuit's translation and his "teachings and warnings". Czechowic accused Wujek of uncredited plagiarism of whole sections. Wujek did not reply but the Jesuit Łaszcz (Martinus Lascius 1551-) published Prescription for a Plaster of Czechowic under the pen name "Szczesny Zebrowski."

== Legacy ==
Czechowic died in poverty and obscurity in 1613. Unlike Sozzini, Crellius, Statorius and other exiles, he did not mark the next four generations at the Racovian Academy with his descendants. The fact that his major writings were in Polish, not Latin, left him a minor place in publications such as the Bibliotheca Fratrum Polonorum quos Unitarios vocant 1668, and Bibliotheca antitrinitariorum 1684 of Sozzini's grandson Andrzej Wiszowaty and Christopher Sandius, which influenced Newton and Voltaire.

Stanisław Kot contributed a biography of Czechowic to the Polski słownik biograficzny (Cracow, 1937, 1957), though till Lech Szczucki published his monograph Marcin Czechowic, 1532-1613 Warsaw 1964, Czechowic was all but forgotten, even in Poland. In the West his name was publicised a little in the works George Huntston Williams in The Radical Reformation 1962, and these sources were picked up by the geographer Alan Eyre who ran articles on Czechowicz in The Christadelphian magazine in the 1970s. His Rozmowy Chrystiańskie was reprinted by the Polish Academy of Sciences in 1979.

== Works ==
Sumariusz 1570 A Polish verse New Testament

A denunciation of the baptism of infants entitled De paedobaptistarum errorum origine et de ea opinione, qua infantes baptizandos esse in prima nativitatis eorum exortu creditur (Lublin, 1575). He criticized what he saw as fourteen errors of the advocates of infant baptism.

Rozmowy Chrystiańskie: Ktorez greckiego názwiská, Diálogámi zowia 1575 Christian Conversations between Teacher and Student - a book endeavoring to show that the objections of the Jews to Jesus as Messiah were unfounded. It was published under the title Rozmowy Chrystiańskie o Tajemnicach Wiaru (Rakow, 1575). In reply to this, Rabbi Jacob Nachman of Bełżyce wrote a defense entitled Odpis Jacoba Zyda z Belzyc na Dialogi Marcina Czechowiza (Lublin, 1581). The arguments of Jacob Nachman called forth a reply from Czechowic, entitled Vindiciæ Duorum Dialogorum Contra Jacobum Judæum de Belzyce.

Polish New Testament 1577. Raków, Kielce County

Epistomium na Wędzidło... księdza Hieronima Powodowskiego, Stopple for the Bit of Father Hieronim Powodowski where Czechowic express solidly a sola scriptura and fundamentalist attitude to the text.

== Bibliography ==
- (in German) Heinrich Grätz, Geschichte der Juden ix. 456
- (in Polish) Samuel Orgelbrand, Encyklopedja Powszechna, iv., Warsaw, 1899
- (in Polish) Lepszy K. and Arnold S. (editors) Słownik biograficzny historii powszechnej do XVII stulecia, Warsaw, Wiedza Powszechna, 1968
- Peter Brock, ed. & trans., "A Polish Anabaptist Against War: The Question of Conscientious Objection in Marcin Czechowic's Christian Dialogues of 1575". The Mennonite Quarterly Review, 52 (1978): 279-93
- Peter Brock, "Dilemmas of a Socinian Pacifist in Seventeenth-Century Poland," Church History, Vol. 63, No. 2 (Jun., 1994), 190-200
- "Marcin Czechowic in Defense of Nonresistance, 1575, Conrad Grebel Review 9(3) (1991) 251-7
- (in Polish) Literatura polska. Przewodnik encyklopedyczny. Warsaw, PWN, 1984, ISBN 83-01-01520-9 t. 1-2, ISBN 83-01-05368-2 t.1
- (in Polish) Encyklopedyczny słownik sławnych Polaków, Warsaw, Oficyna Wydawniczo-Poligraficzna "Adam", 1996, ISBN 83-85207-90-2
