= Jan Niemojewski =

Polish Nobleman and Theologian

Janusz Jan Niemojewski (1531–1598) was a Polish nobleman, and theologian of the Polish Brethren.

== Works ==
- 1583 – "Odpowiedź na potwarz Wilkowskiego"
- 1583 – "Obrona przeciw niesprawiedliwemu obwinieniu".
- 1584 – "Ukazanie iż kościół rzymski papieski nie jest apostolski..."
- 1611 – Fausto Sozzini, "Scripta theologica seu tractatus breves de diversis materiis", Raków 1611, pp. 94–293.
