= Marcello Squarcialupi =

Italian physician and astronomer

Marcello Squarcialupi (Piombino c. 1538-Alba Iulia 1599) was an Italian physician, astronomer, and Protestant exile in Basel who later became a Unitarian exile in Transylvania. His works included De cometis dissertationes novae clarissimae (New Clear Essays On Comets), published in Basel in 1580. In 1587, from Poschiavo, he wrote to the Senate in Alba Iulia, though it is uncertain whether the letter was ever delivered.
