= Christian Francken =

German writer (c.1550–after 1610)

Christian Francken (Gardelegen c. 1550 – Rome? after 1610) was a former Jesuit who became an anti-Trinitarian writer.

In 1577 Francken left his position as professor of the Jesuit college in Vienna and commenced the publication from Basel and La Rochelle of many tracts against the order. François Du Jon in 1584 wrote his Defensio catholicae doctrinae de s. trinitate personarum in unitate essentiae Dei, adversus Samosatenicos errores against Francken. Francken's printer was arrested in Poland.

On July 9, 1587, Franken was in Prague and introduced to John Dee. Later, on October 13, 1592, Dee would show Franken's book of "blasphemie" (Poland 1585) to John Whitgift, the Archbishop of Canterbury, desiring it be confuted.

Francken worked alongside Francis David, Johannes Sommer, Jacob Palaeologus as lector at the Unitarian Gymnasium in Cluj (German: Klausenburg, Hungarian: Kolozsvár, Latin: Claudiopolis) in 1585 and between 1589 and 1591.

He published two works in Prague in 1595. In 1598 Francken travels to Italy in the company of papal delegate Cesare Speciano, where he was arrested and imprisoned by the Inquisition. The last document among the Inquisition's acts mentioning his name stems from 1611.

== Works ==
- Colloquium Iesuiticum printed by Pietro Perna, Basel 1581
- Analysis rixae christianae, quae imperium turbat, et diminuit Romanum. Prague 1595. (several editions later)
- Argumenta XXII in Sacram Mosis Historiam. In: François Du Jon: Confutatio argumentorum XXII, quae olim a Simplicio in Sacram Mosis historiam de creatione fuerunt proposita, et nostro saeculo ab hominibus prophanis atheisque recocta imperitis obtruduntur. In: Francisci Junii Biturigis Opera Theologica, Genevae 1613, Bd 1, 99–120. Modern edition: Pirnát Antal: Christian Francken egy ismeretlen munkája (Christian Francken's unknown work). In: Irodalomtörténeti Közlmények, 1983, 107–119.
- Breve Colloqvivm Iesuiticvm, Toti Orbi Christiano, & vrbi potissimum Caesareae Viennensi, ad rectae cognoscendam, hactenus non satis perspectam, Iesuitarum religionem, vtilissimum: Habitvm a [...] Pavlo Florenio, cum Christiano Francken [...] Anno 1578 20. Ianuarij. Leipzig 1579. (several editions later)
- Disputatio inter Theologum et Philosophum de incertitudine Religionis Christianae. MS Cluj ca. 1590, printed first in Simon: Die Religionsphilosophie Christian Franckens, Wiesbaden 2008, 151–182.
- De bestialissima idololatria, quam in adoratione panis et vini Romana committit bellua, quamque fidissima huius renovat Socia Jesu divino sub cognomento latitans secunde bestia, paradoxa sex. Basel 1580.
- De praedestinatione mira paradoxa tria. Basel 1580.
- Dolium Diogenis strepitu suo collaborans dynastis Christianis bellum in Turcas parantibus. Prague 1595. (several editions later)
- Letter to Claudio Aquaviva (1591). In: Lech Szczucki: W kręgu myślicieli heretyckich. Wrocław-Warszawa-Kraków-Gdańsk 1972, 254–256.
- Praecipuarum enumeratio causarum, cur Christiani, cum in multis modis religionis doctrinis mobiles sint et varii, in Trinitatis tamen retinendo dogmate sint constantissimi. Kraków 1584. Modern edition: Lech Szczucki: W kręgu myślicieli heretyckich. Wrocław-Warszawa-Kraków-Gdańsk 1972, 256–267.
- Spectrum diurnum Genii Christiani Francken, apparens malo Simonis Simonii Genio. MS Cluj ca. 1590, printed first in Simon: Die Religionsphilosophie Christian Franckens, Wiesbaden 2008, 183–203.

Secondary literature

- Firpo, Luigi: Christian Francken antitrinitario. In: Bollettino della Societa di Studi Valdesi, 78 (1959) 27–35.
- Keserű, Bálint: Christian Franckens Tätigkeit im ungarischen Sprachgebiet und sein unbekanntes Werk "Disputatio de incertitudine religionis Christianae". In: Antitrinitarianism in the Second Half of the 16th Century. Ed. by Róbert Dán and Antal Pirnát. Budapest 1982, 73–84.
- Szczucki, Lech: Philosophie und Autorität. Der Fall Christian Francken. In: Reformation und Frühaufklärung in Polen. Studien über den Sozinianismus und seinen Einfluß auf das westeuropäische Denken im 17. Jahrhundert. Göttingen 1977, 157–243.
- Szczucki, Lech: Polish and Transylvanian Unitarianism in the Second Half of the 16th Century. In: Antitrinitarianism in the Second Half of the 16th Century. Ed. by Róbert Dán and Antal Pirnát. Budapest 1982, 215–230.
- Szczucki, Lech: Una polemica sconosciuta tra Christian Francken e Simone Simoni. In: Humanistica. Ed. Cesare Vasoli. Ed. F. Meroi and E. Scapparone. Florence 2004, 159–170.
- Szczucki, Lech: W kręgu myślicieli heretyckich, Wrocław-Warszawa-Kraków-Gdańsk 1972.
- Simon, József: Die Religionsphilosophie Christian Franckens – Atheismus und radikale Reformation im frühneuzeitlichen Ostmitteleuropa. Wolfenbütteler Forschungen Bd. 117. Wiesbaden 2008.
- Wijacka, Jacek: Christian Francken. Bibliotheca dissidentium. Tom. 13. Baden-Baden 1991.
- Clarisse Roche, Usages et mises en scène de l'amitié entre Paulus Florenius et Christian Francken dans les polémiques religieuses à Vienne (1578–1590) dans : Amitié. Un lien politique et social en Allemagne et en France, XIIe–XIXe siècle (8e université d’été de l’Institut historique allemand en coopération avec l’université Paris-Sorbonne, l'université Albert-Ludwig, Fribourg-en-Brisgau, et l'École des hautes études en sciences sociales, 3–6 juillet 2011), éd. par Bertrand Haan, Christian Kühner (discussions, 8). Online on perspectivia.net
