= Andreas Fischer (Anabaptist) =

Andreas Fischer (ca. 1480 – 1540) was an Austrian/Moravian Anabaptist, and associate of Oswald Glaidt. He first appears as an Anabaptist leader in the public records in 1528 in Silesia, as a literary opponent of Caspar Schwenckfeldt's associate, Valentine Crautwald. His main written work is "Scepastes Decologi," in which he defended not only adult baptism but also (following Oswald Glaidt) the reinstitution of Saturday/Sabbath keeping as a Christian practice. This work is lost, but its main arguments are carefully reconstructed by Daniel Liechty (pp54ff.) based on Crautwald's tract against it ("Bericht und anzaigen wie gar one kunst und guether versandt, Andreas Fischer Vom Sabbat geschriben.") Fischer spent the 1530s moving back and forth between Silesia, Moravia and Slovakia, where he found fertile ground for his ideas especially among the population of miners, who were staging a series of strikes and revolts throughout that decade. Fischer was arrested and put to death in 1540.
