= Johannes Bünderlin =

Johannes Bünderlin (b. Linz before 1500 – after 1540) was an Austrian Anabaptist. Bünderlin was a humanist Catholic priest who had been attracted to the Reformation in Moravia and was baptised by Johannes Denck. Bünderlin returned to Linz and preached there until forced to leave for Konstanz in 1529 at the invitation of Johannes Zwick, though Zwick soon considered that Bünderlin was too radical in his ideas and Bünderlin set out for Prussia.

== Life ==
Johannes Bünderlin was born in Linz, Upper Austria, and studied at the University of Vienna from 1515 to 1519, where he learned Hebrew, Greek and Latin, but left without taking a degree as he was unable to afford the tuition. He became a Lutheran preacher in the employ of an Austrian nobleman, but in 1526 received adult baptism as an Anabaptist in Augsburg, where he probably met Hans Denck. From Augsburg, Bünderlin went first to Nikolsburg, where Anabaptist leader Balthasar Hubmaier was arrested and later tortured and burned as a heretic. After two years, the continued persecution of Anabaptists prompted a move to the more free-thinking city of Strasbourg. Bünderlin was expelled from the city of Constance in 1530 because of his religious views.

== Belief ==
Bünderlin believed in a two-fold revelation of God, as the living Word in the soul of man, and through external signs and events. He believed that through love, one could realize the inward Word, bring the human will to peace and harmony with God's will and become one with the eternal Spirit. The purpose of religion was to awaken the mind and to direct it to the inward Word.

"Love must bloom and the spirit of the man must follow the will of God written in his heart."

This union with the Spirit, of living upward toward the divine goodness instead of downward toward individual selfhood is an act of free will that results in Salvation.

== Published works ==
- Bünderlin, Johannes (1529). Ein gemayne Berechnung über der Heiligen Schrift Inhalt [A General Consideration of the Contents of Holy Scripture] (in German). Strasbourg.
- Bünderlin, Johannes (1529). Aus was Ursach sich Gott in die nyder gelassen und in Christo vermenschet ist [For what cause God has descended here below and has become incarnate in Christ] (in German).
- Bünderlin, Johannes (1530). Erklärung durch Vergleichung der biblischen Geschrift, doss der Wassertauf sammt andern äusserlichen Gebräuchen in der apostolischen Kirchen geubet, on Gottes Befelch und Zeugniss der Geschrift, von etlichen dieser Zeit wider efert wird [Declaration by comparison of the Biblical Writings that Baptism with Water, together with other External Customs practised in the Apostolic Church, have been reinstated by some at this time without the Command of God or the Witness of the Scriptures] (in German).
