= Matvei Bashkin =

Russian boyar and enemy of the orthodox church

Matvei Semyonovich Bashkin (Russian: Матвей Семёнович Башкин) was a Russian boyar scion in the time of Ivan the Terrible charged with heresy for denial of the doctrine of the Trinity along with abbot Artemy the former abbot of Trinity-St. Sergius Monastery. In 1553 he organised a circle of gentry in Moscow and began to teach against the Orthodox Church. He was beaten and sentenced to imprisonment in the Joseph-Volokolamsk Monastery where he died.
