= Bank of Venice =

Bank of Venice may refer to one of two successive public banks of the Republic of Venice:

- Banco della Piazza di Rialto (1587-1638)
- Banco del Giro (1619-1807)
