= Provveditori sopra Banchi =

Magristrature in Venice

The Provveditori sopra Banchi (Venetian: provedadori sora banchi, lit. 'bank superintendents') were magistrates of the Republic of Venice who ensured the smooth operations of the banks on Rialto Square, the center of the city-state's financial activity. They represent the world's earliest documented case of specialized banking supervision, in continuous activity from 1524 to the demise of the Republic in 1797.

== Overview ==
From the 12th century onwards, the Consoli dei Mercanti were in charge of oversight of all business activity including banks, on which their main role was to check the quality of assets deposited as guarantee to bankers' liabilities. In 1455, a banking reform tasked the Consoli with securing public disclosure of bankers' books, enforcing capital requirements, and checking coin prices.

On 21 October 1502, the first provveditore sopra Banchi was appointed on a temporary basis. From 4 June 1524, the Consoli were permanently replaced in their bank oversight role with the Provveditori sopra Banchi who were three specialized government-appointed magistrates. They inspected bankers' books with the help of an official auditor (quaderniere); received complaints from the bankers' customers; fined bankers in breach of regulatory and transparency standards; and kept a register of newly established companies. The intrusive supervision by the Provveditori also allowed the Venetian state to gather useful insights on the economy and business trends.

The Provveditori sopra Banchi survived the extinction of private deposit banking in Venice in 1584, and kept overseeing the Banco della Piazza di Rialto and the Banco del Giro until the end of the latter's activity in 1797.

== See also ==
- Provveditore
- Banking regulation and supervision
