= Rialto Square =

Public space in Venice

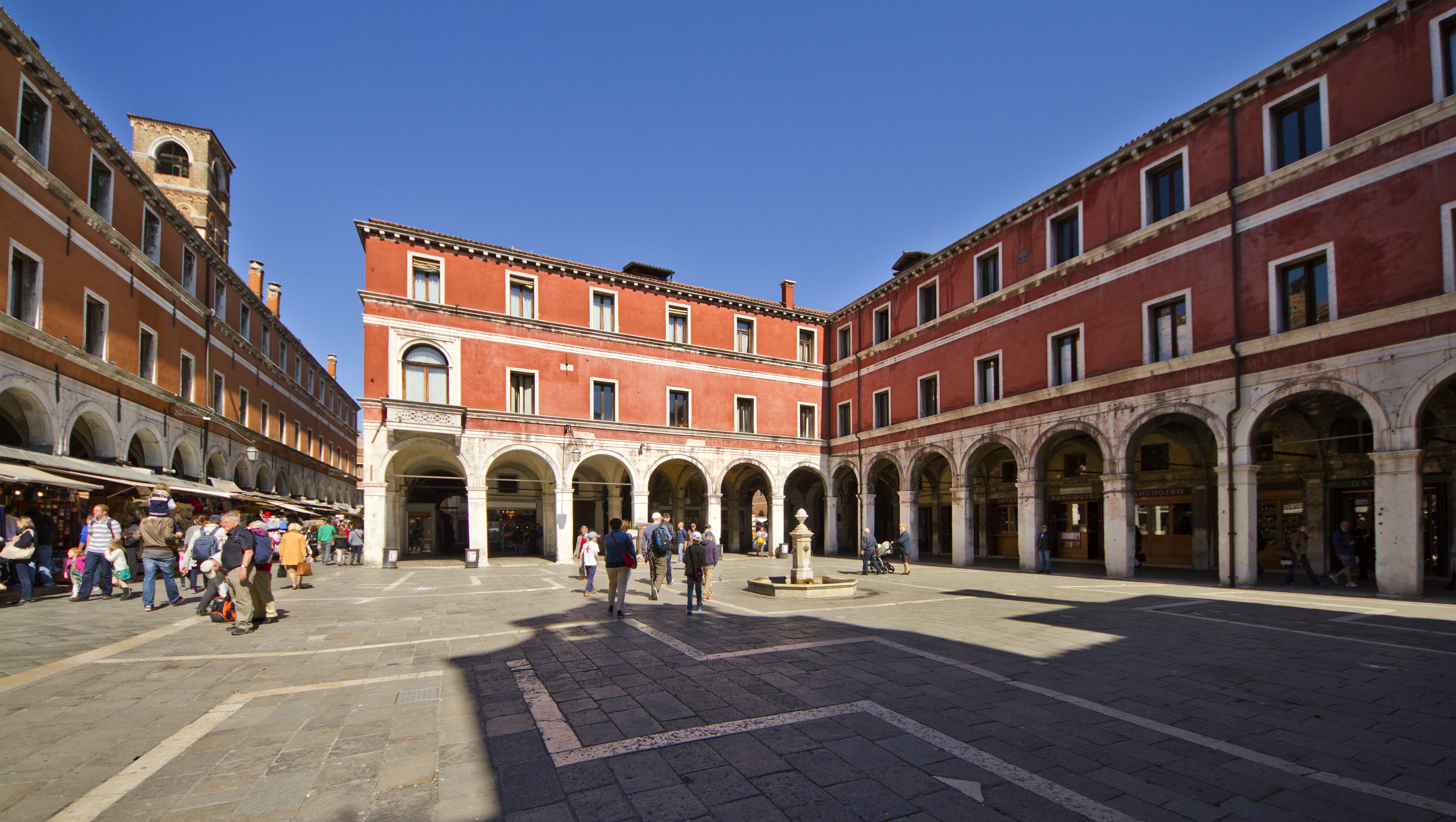
Rialto Square in 2014

Rialto Square (Italian: Piazza di Rialto), also known as Campo San Giacomo di Rialto or Campo San Giacometto, is a public space in the Rialto neighborhood of Venice. It is connected to the Rialto Bridge by the ruga dei Oresi (also known as ruga degli Orefici), flanked by the church of San Giacomo di Rialto and the two main former seats of financial administration of the Republic of Venice, respectively the Palazzo dei Camerlenghi and the Palazzo dei Dieci Savi. It also connects via covered passages to the Rialto Market on the banks of the Grand Canal.

For centuries, Rialto Square was the center of financial activity in Venice, including from 1587 the city's two public banks, Banco della Piazza di Rialto and Banco del Giro. Benches (Italian: banchi) on the square were owned by the city government and rented to individual bankers (banchieri), who took deposits from merchants and lent to the city government. Money changers formed a separate community that operated across town near St Mark's Campanile, a separation of roles that was unique to Venice among Mediterranean merchant republics.

== History ==
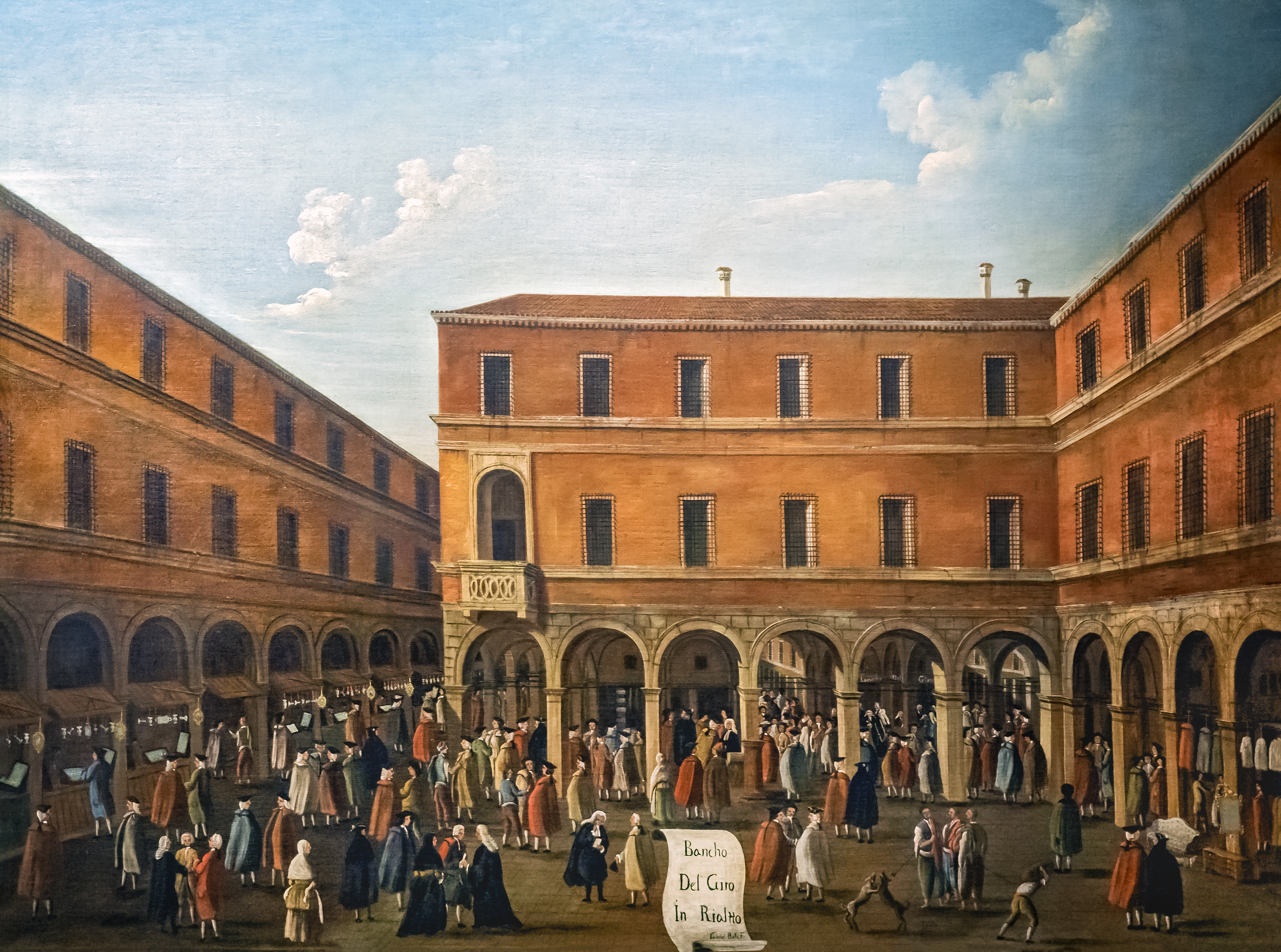
The Banco del Giro on Rialto Square by Gabriele Bella (c.1780s), Pinacoteca Querini Stampalia

Originally, the Venice market was held on Saturdays in the large square of Olivolo in Castello. Especially in the early days, it was known for the lack of taxes and other public charges, and in this way it was able to compete with the markets of Pavia and Campalto, then among the most important in Italy. When the government took shape in the 9th century, the Rialto became the driving force in the development of Venetian trade, with the establishment of a fish and vegetable market.

Since 1300, the bells of San Giacomo have signaled the opening and closing of the market, known as the Banco.

By the end of the 15th century, there were three major markets in Venice: the first Saturday of each month at Rialto, the second Saturday at San Marco, and the third at Campo San Giovanni in Bragora; among these, the Rialto always was the most important commercial center. Trading took place not only al minuto but also in large lots, prices were set, imports and exports were regulated, and ships were chartered. In addition to the trade in fish and vegetables, there was a commodity exchange where gold and silver were mainly traded.

The state supervised and directed all transactions. For trade with the rest of Italy, the Dogana di Terra imposed a tax on every shipment of fabric, oil, wine, flour, millet, or beans. The Fondaco della Farina was a large state-run store where families could shop and provide for themselves, but only for a period of one month to prevent hoarding and speculation. Bakers also stocked up on flour at Rialto.

The state rented the traders a "stazio", namely an outdoor stall with a bench in front, a wooden shed behind, and the whole covered with a tarpaulin. There were also itinerant traders who, unlike stall holders, did not have to pay significant taxes and were tolerated by them because their modest trade in eggs, chickens, and some vegetables represented no material competition.

A disastrous fire devastated the area on 10 January 1514. The city government subsequently launched a competition to rebuild the area. After delays and controversy, Antonio Abbondi (also known as Scarpagnino) won and designed a square largely modelled on the earlier setting but with a standardized layout of shops, with a rational allocation of spaces. Bulky, perishable, or waste-producing goods such as fish, fruit, and vegetables were moved to the waterfront. Precious goods such as gold, silver, and spices were traded on the bridge and along the goldsmiths' alley leading to it, the ruga degli orefici. Financial activities remained on the square itself, also known as Campo San Giacomo for the eponymous church which had been spared by the fire. Public administration had offices on the upper floors of the square's palazzi.

The Rialto was devoted to trading, with no crafts or industries. All goods were brought in by boat and, after being inspected by tax officials, were unloaded and transported on by porters, the bastasi. These were only allowed to stay on the banks for the short time they needed to load, unload, or inspect the goods. The hustle and bustle on the canal side was thus filled with noise, shouts, and cursing, in contrast to the quiet of the square itself where the wealthy merchants and financiers concluded their deals.

Rialto square also hosted the draperia (cloth market) and the seat of the twelve Padri di Rivo Alto, who were responsible for market regulations. The Latin inscription on the church of San Giacometto reads: "hoc circa templum sit jus mercantibus aequum, pondera nec vergant, nec sit conventio prava" admonished the merchants in this place to practice their trade with decency, not to tamper with the scales, and not to cheat. If one of them was caught cheating, he would feel the whip at the Gobbo di Rialto, a 1541 sculpture by Pietro da Salò, and would have to "basar el Gobo", kiss the repulsive figure.

== Banking on Rialto Square ==
In 1282, the Republic organized most public finance activities under its Grain Office, which subsequently did a banking business on behalf of the government. It accepted time deposits from wealthy citizens and foreigners, and advanced loans to government departments and private enterprises. To ensure the availability of funds, the government mandated the deposit of some types of savings, such as dowries, at the Grain Office. The office ran into difficulty in the mid-14th century and was liquidated.

The Venetian state, however, kept playing a significant role in organizing the financial market activity, which made the Venetian financial system structurally different from those of other merchant republics. The benches on which banks operated on Rialto Square were owned by the city and rented to individual bankers. Bankers used the government-owned Palazzo dei Camerlenghi for safekeeping, and their books had the legal status of public records.

The system of emergency loans (imprestiti) was a widely used saving and investment option. The Republic started collecting these loans in the twelfth century, demanding from each propertied citizen a fraction of his wealth. The loans were voluntary at first and later compulsory, and were repaid over time from public revenues. In 1262 the Republic consolidated its loans into one loan called the Monte (Fund) that paid 5 percent interest. Repayment of loan principal continued until 1365, after which only interest was paid. In 1375 the Republic added the option of buying back its debt on the open market. Shares of the Monte could not be withdrawn at par value and therefore were not deposits, but they were readily transferable on the books of the Chamber of Loans. These claims to the interest were called paghe. The Republic kept up payments on this "old fund" (Monte Vecchio) until the War of Ferrara, at which point it defaulted and introduced a new debt series, the Monte Nuovo, followed by the Monte Nuovissimo during the War of the League of Cambrai in 1509.

The number of banks on Rialto Square decreased gradually, from eight to ten in the early 14th century to a handful from the late 15th century and eventually only one, the Pisani-Tiepolo house, in the third quarter of the 16th century. After that bank ran into distress in 1576, the Venetian Senate considered various options and eventually established the Banco della Piazza di Rialto in 1587, initially as a temporary fix. In 1619, the Banco del Giro was established separately as another public financial institution, also initially intended as temporary, which however soon superseded the Banco della Piazza di Rialto and became Venice's monopoly public bank in 1637. The Banco del Giro kept operating until the demise of the Venetian Republic in 1797.

== See also ==
- Cahorsins
- Lombard banking
