= Banco della Piazza di Rialto =

Former Venetian public bank

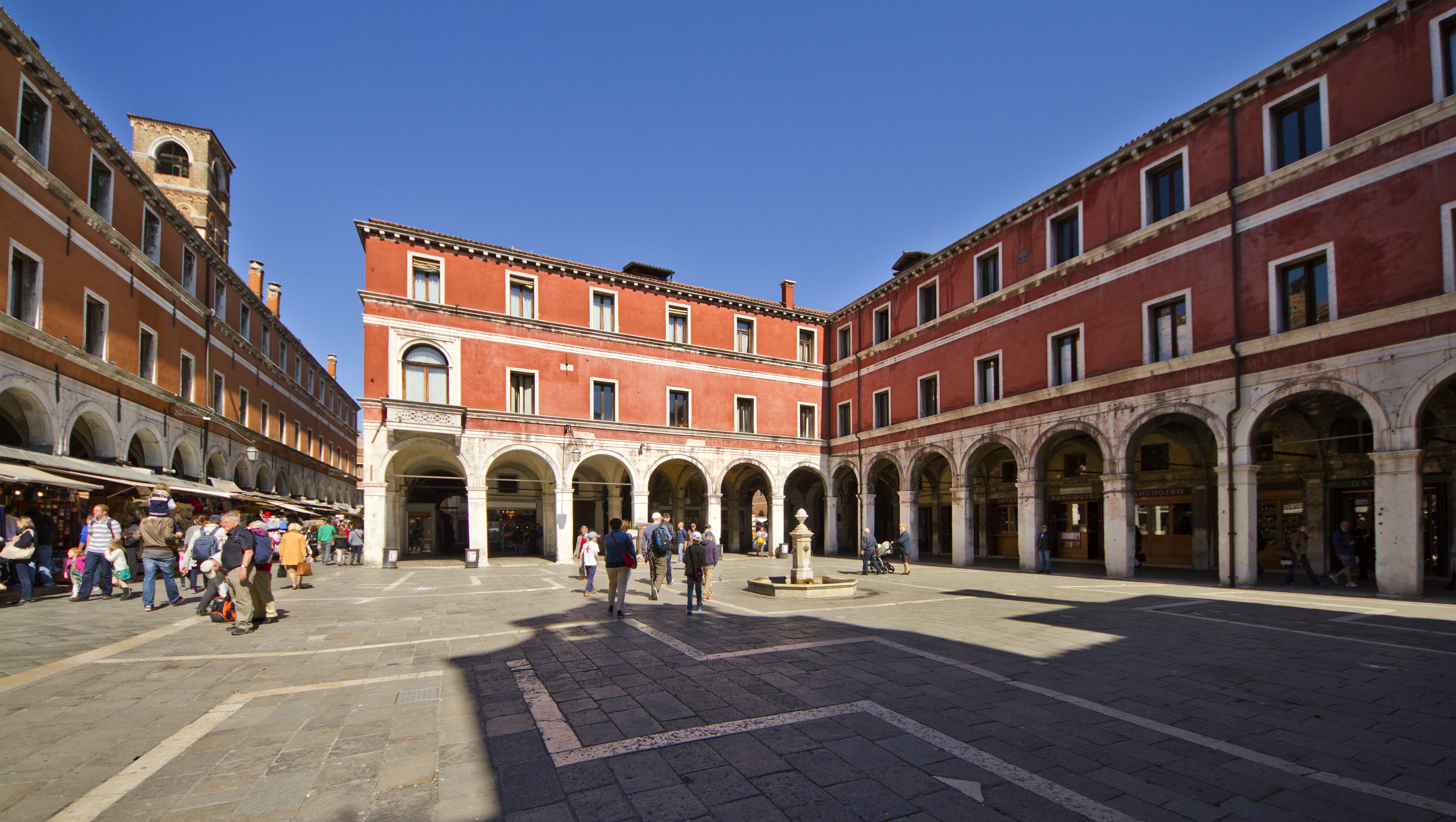
Rialto Square in Venice, where the bank operated

The Banco della Piazza di Rialto, sometimes referred to as Banco di Rialto, was the first public bank of the Republic of Venice, operating on the eponymous Rialto Square. It was in activity from 1587 to 1637, when it succumbed to the competition from the Banco del Giro, a separate public institution that had been established in 1619.

The Banco della Piazza di Rialto was relatively short-lived, and was not the first public bank with features of an early central bank in Europe, a concept that was pioneered by the Taula de canvi de Barcelona in 1401 (even though proposals were made for such an entity in Venice in the 14th century). Even so, it had considerable influence in the development of European finance, and provided the direct model for the establishment of the Bank of Amsterdam in 1609.

== Background ==
An early proposal for a banco per Comune, a public municipal bank that would complement the operation of Venice's private banks, was made to the Venetian Senate by Senator Giovanni Dolfin in 1356. A comparable proposal was made again in 1374 by a committee headed by Michele Morosini.

These proposals were rejected, and the Venetian system kept relying on private bankers competing on Rialto Square. The number of such banks, however, decreased gradually, from eight to ten in the early 14C to a handful from the late 15C and eventually only one, the Pisani-Tiepolo house, in the third quarter of the 16th century. When that bank ran into distress in 1576, it was supported by the state through a loan from the city mint, but eventually succumbed to a run in 1584. After some debate, the Senate invited applications from private businessmen, but none was forthcoming.

== Banco della Piazza di Rialto ==
On 11 April 1587, the Senate eventually decided to establish a public bank, the Banco della Piazza di Rialto, which however would be managed by a private banker on the state's payroll. After some back-and-forth, this scheme was replaced later in 1587 by a three-year public concession under which the concessionary had unlimited liability and was required to close all positions at the end of his term. The bank was required to keep its money fully convertible into coin. In 1593, a law granted legal tender status to deposits at the bank, and required citizens to settle all bills of exchange through it.

At its peak, the bank had around four thousand depositors, with a balance sheet reaching close to a million ducats at the end of the 16th century. Such deposits were used actively as a dominant means of payment for commercial transactions. At its presumed peak in 1618, the total amount of deposits at the bank reached 1.7 million ducats.

The bank was subject to banking supervision by the Provveditori sopra Banchi, specialized magistrates established earlier in the 16th century.

From 1619 on, the Banco della Piazza di Rialto had to compete with the Banco del Giro, initially established as a temporary clearing mechanism. In January 1627, the Senate resolved to relocate the Banco di Rialto in the premises of the Banco Giro, as its activity had already shrunk markedly. By 1630, the Banco del Giro's monetary issuance was twice that of the Banco della Piazza di Rialto, whose business further declined in the 1630s. It ceased activity in 1637, and was formally closed by a decree of January 1638. Throughout its existence, the Banco della Piazza di Rialto maintained full convertibility of its currency.

== Historiographical debate about a medieval "Bank of Venice" ==
Several 19th-century authors described a "Bank of Venice" formed in the 12th century, calling it Europe's first national bank and an innovator of non-redeemable debt-based money. Archival research has duly corrected these accounts, distinguishing between the Republic's financing offices, the business of its private bankers, and the much later Banco della Piazza di Rialto, the Republic's first actual public bank. According to the misrepresentation, the Republic collected an emergency loan (prestito) in 1157 or 1171 to support its trade wars against the Byzantine Empire. When the Byzantine–Venetian war of 1171 ended in a disastrous defeat, the Republic was ruined and Doge Vitale II Michiel was assassinated. With no means of repaying the loan, the Republic promptly converted it to a perpetual annuity (or in some accounts, offered lenders nothing at all). The legend claims that citizens adopted this imaginary money, finding it more convenient than coins, and the Chamber of Loans became the public bank.

Henry Dunning Macleod's Theory and Practice of Banking (1856) called the story a "great current delusion," while at the same time arguing that the Republic's transferable debt was an important forerunner of deposit banking. Sidney Dean's History of Banking (1884) collected several descriptions of the supposed early bank. It noted that researchers had been unable to find documentation of the bank as described, but dismissed this as an oversight of the Venetians. Charles F. Dunbar emphasized the weakness of the legend in 1892. He presented recently published archives as evidence that private deposit bankers operated in Venice by 1318 and were its only bankers until 1584.

== See also ==
- Bank of Saint George
- History of banking
- List of banks in Italy
