= Gabriele Bella =

Italian painter

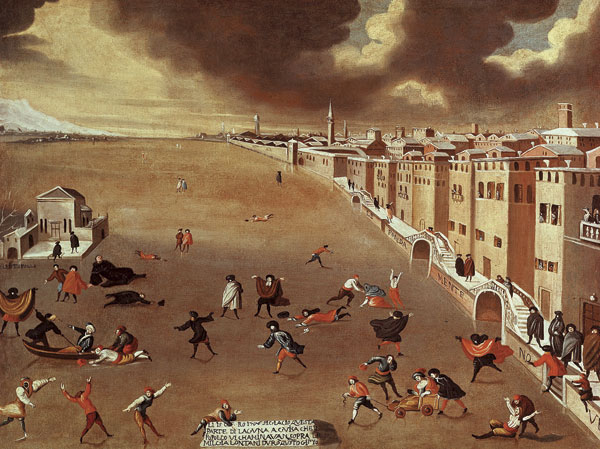
Venice Frozen Lagoon of 1708 by Gabriele Bella, Pinacoteca Querini Stampalia

Gabriele Bella (1730-1799) was an Italian Baroque painter.

Not much is known about Bella other than through his works. He lived and worked around Venice. He primarily painted buildings and city life. Sixty-seven canvasses by Gabriel Bella are part of the collections of the Pinacoteca Querini Stampalia.
