= Banco del Giro =

Former Venetian bank

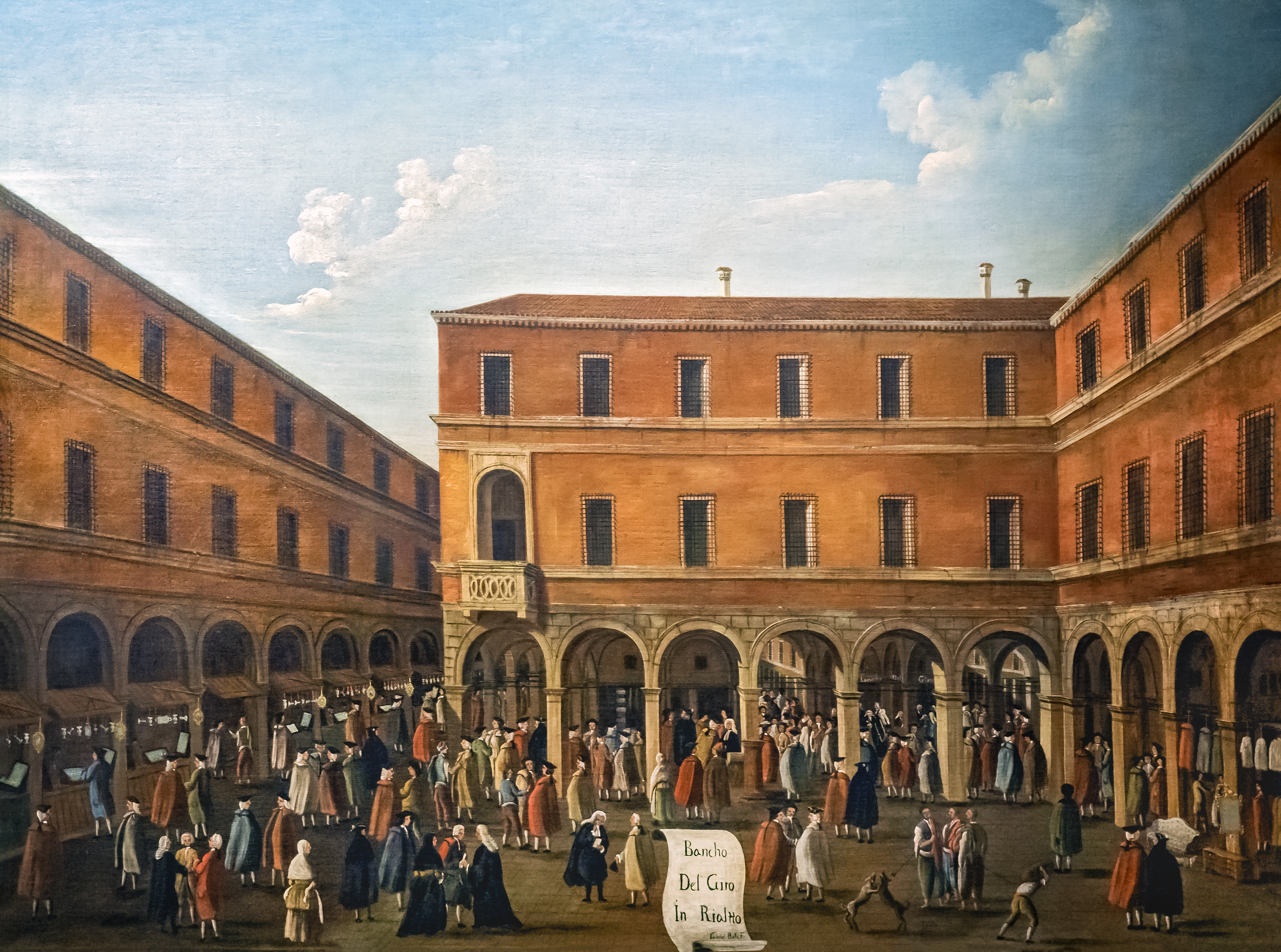
The Banco del Giro on Rialto Square, by Gabriele Bella (c.1780s), Pinacoteca Querini Stampalia

The Banco del Giro (Venetian: Banco del Ziro), also Banco Giro or Bancogiro, sometimes referred to in English as the Bank of Venice, was a public bank created by the Republic of Venice in 1619, which remained in activity until the end of the Republic in 1797.

The Banco del Giro has been described as "the likely first experiment with a purely fiduciary state-issued legal-tender money". It also provided the model for the 1675 reorganization of the banking operations of the Genoese Casa di San Giorgio into a single entity, the Banco di San Giorgio.

== Overview ==
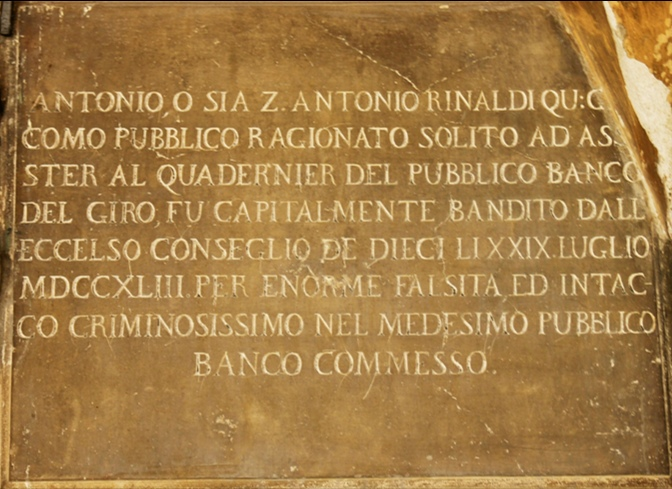

The failure of Venice's private banks had led to the creation of the public Banco della Piazza di Rialto in 1587. In 1619 Giovanni Vendramin, a merchant from the Vendramin family, suggested that his claims on the city government be made transferable to third parties through accounts managed by the Republican government, echoing longstanding Venetian practices since the 13th century. The Republic accepted and established the Banco del Giro as a temporary clearing mechanism, expected to be phased out after three years. The success of the scheme, however, led to the deadline being extended from year to year, and the amounts in the accounts increased during the war of the Mantuan Succession and the plague of 1629–1631, so that the Banco del Giro became a permanent monetary institution. By 1630, its issuance was already double that of the Banco della Piazza del Rialto.

The bank's administration was entrusted to the Senate, which appointed the Depositario, the magistrate who actually ran it, from among its members.

Initially, the Banco del Giro's money, namely government debt used as a means of payment, was fully inconvertible, in contrast with that of the Banco della Piazza di Rialto. Its value in specie depreciated during times of warfare in the 1620s and 1640s, but re-appreciated in the 1630s and 1650s as Venetian government debt was gradually resorbed. In 1666, however, the government yielded to lobbying from merchants and made the bank's money convertible, which it remained throughout the late 17th and 18th centuries except for a suspension during the Ottoman–Venetian war of 1714–1718, which was only lifted in 1739.

Until around 1650, the Banco del Giro was of similar size as the Bank of Amsterdam. In line with its purpose at creation, its assets were overwhelmingly Venetian government debt. From 1651 on, its deposits were made sole legal tender for all commercial payments above 50 ducats.

The bank suspended its activity from 1797 to 1800 following the fall of the Republic, and in 1805 the Napoleonic Kingdom of Italy assumed its debt and repaid its depositors with its own bonds. It was formally liquidated in 1807.

== Legacy ==
One of the sotoportegos of the Rialto Square is still known as Sotoportego del Banco Giro.

== See also ==
- Provveditori sopra Banchi
- List of central banks
- List of banks in Italy
