= Michele Carcano =

Blessed Michele Carcano
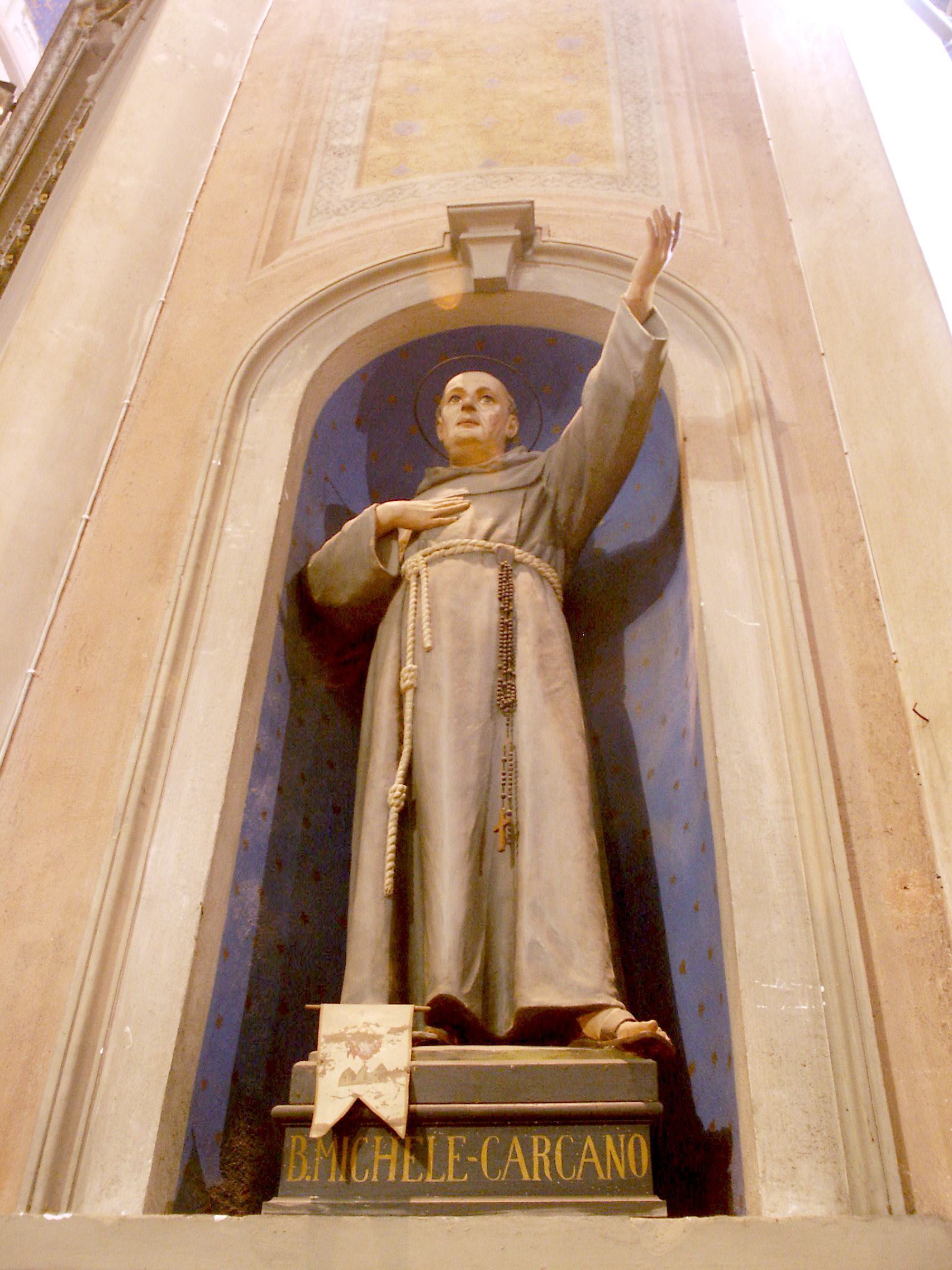

Universal preacher of the Church
- Born: 1427; Lomazzo, Duchy of Milan, Italy
- Died: 20 March 1484; Lodi, Duchy of Milan, Italy
- Venerated in: Catholic Church
- Feast: 20 March
- Attributes: cross, skull,
- Patronage: Sant'Anna Hospital chapel, Como

Michele Carcano O.F.M. Obs. (Michael de Carcanis de Mediolano) (Lomazzo, 1427- 20 March 1484) was an Italian Franciscan preacher. He is known for his part in founding the montes pietatis banking system, with Bernardine of Feltre.

== Background ==
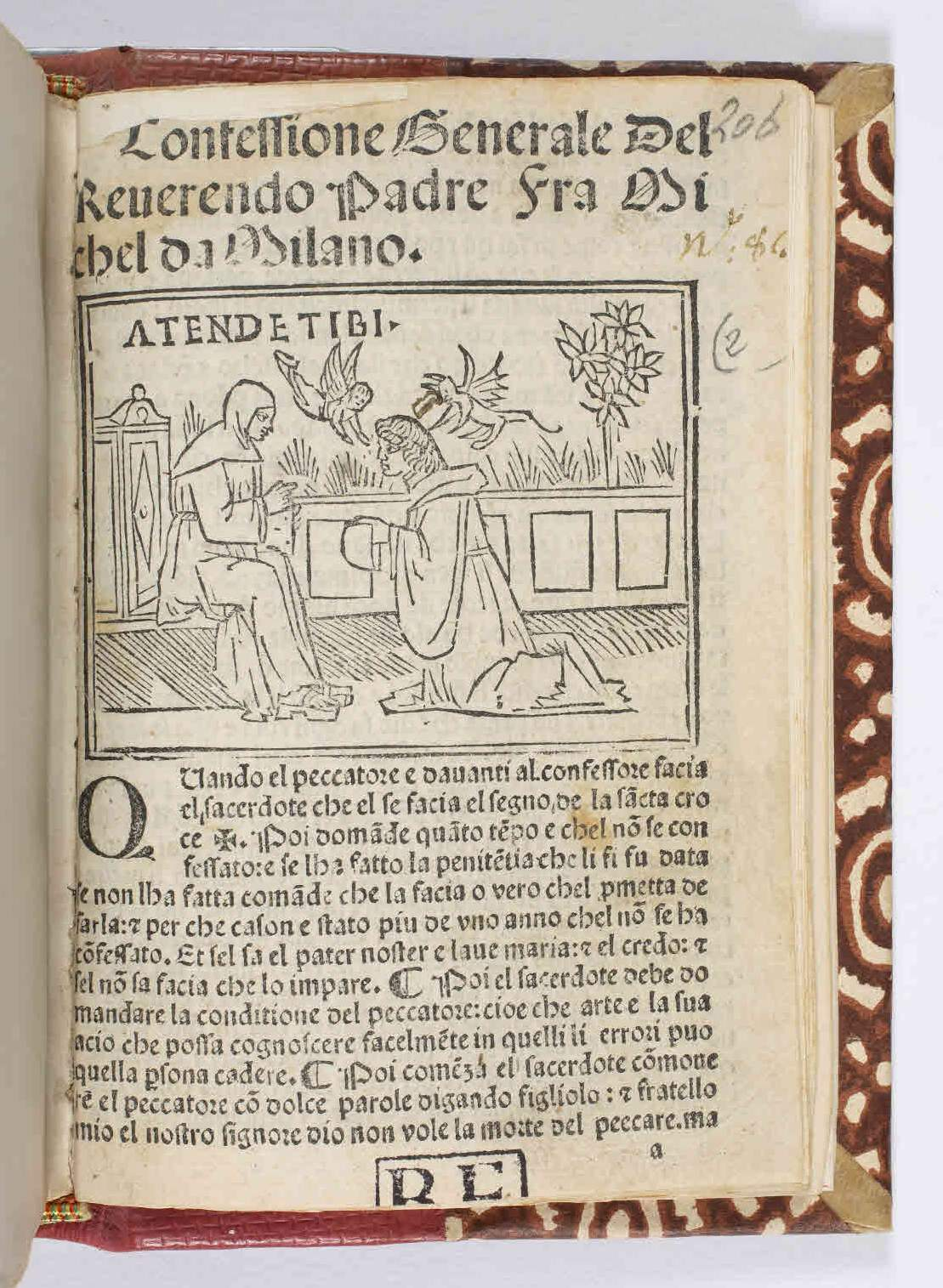
Confessionale generale, 1500

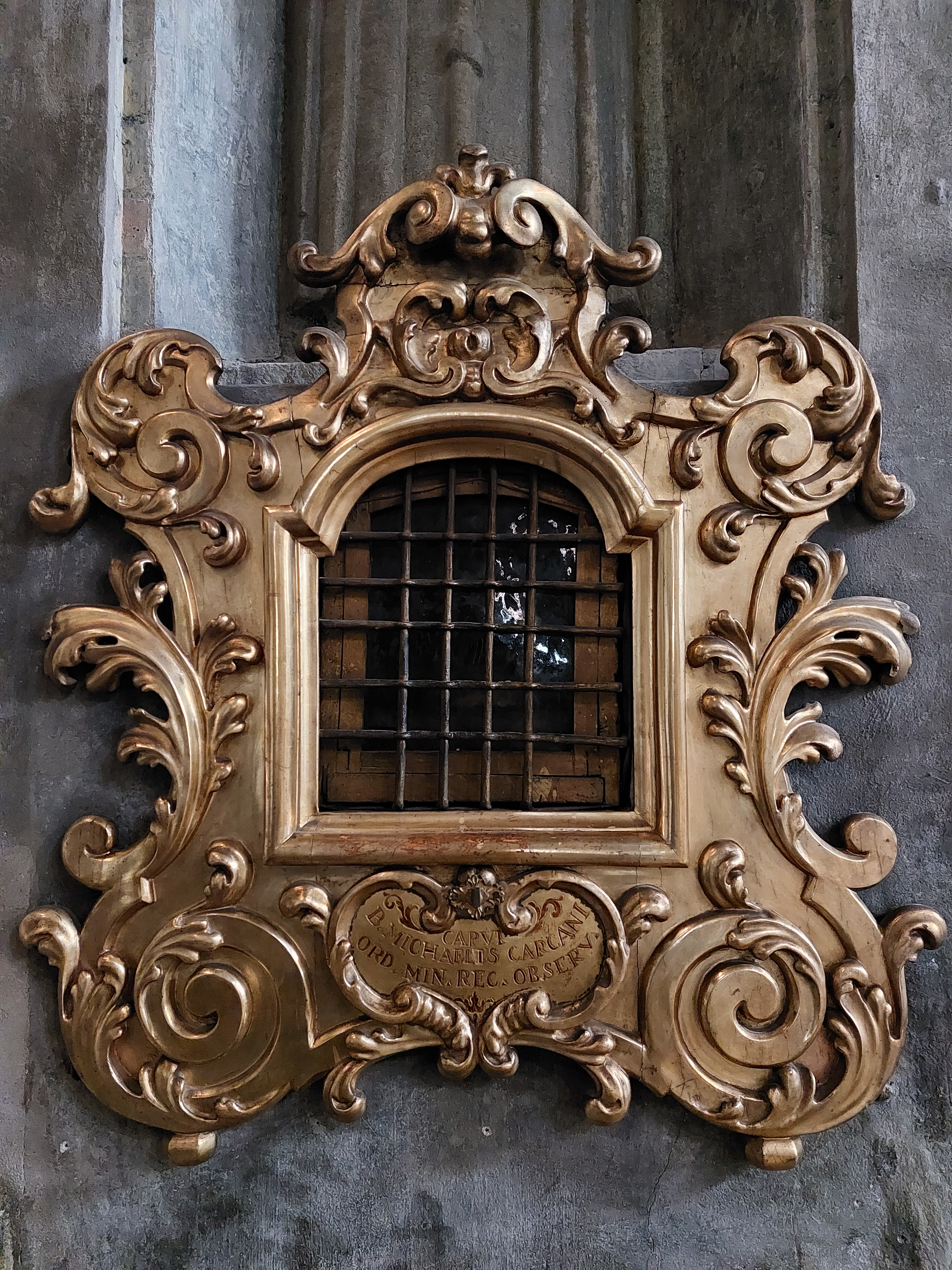
The niche where the head of Blessed Carcano is kept, in the church of st Francis in Lodi

The Montes Pietatius were charitable institutions of credit that lent money at low rates of interest, or without interest at all, upon the security of objects left in pawn, with a view to protecting persons in want from usurers. As Christians were forbidden to practice usury, i.e., taking loans on interest, the Jews took up much of the credit business. However, Christian lenders, often referred to as Cahorsins or Lombards, often charged interest much greater than Jewish lenders.

== Life ==
Michele Carcano was born in 1427 to a noble family of Milan, he joined the Franciscans in 1442. After his ordination, he became an itinerant preacher.

The mons pietatis of Perugia was founded in consequence of Carcano's preaching in that city in 1461, in which he inveighed against the usury of the Jews. The fund for that charitable establishment was made up in part by voluntary contributions and in part by money lent by the Jews themselves.

He preached against usury, which he connected to the Jews. His anti-Semitic discourses did much to embolden persecution against Jews, particularly in the case of the blood libel concerning Simon of Trent. On Holy Thursday in the year 1475, the child, then about 20 months old, son of a gardener, was missed by its parents. On the evening of Easter Sunday the body was found in a ditch. Several Jews were accused of the alleged murder, cruelly tortured, and executed.

His sermons were later printed as Sermones quadragesimales fratris Michaelis de Mediolano de decem preceptis (1492). They include arguments in favour of religious art.

== Veneration ==
Carcano's spiritual writings were approved by theologians on 22 November 1939. He was later granted the title of Servant of God.

== See also ==
- Barnabas of Terni
