= History of pawnbroking =

History of lending money on portable security

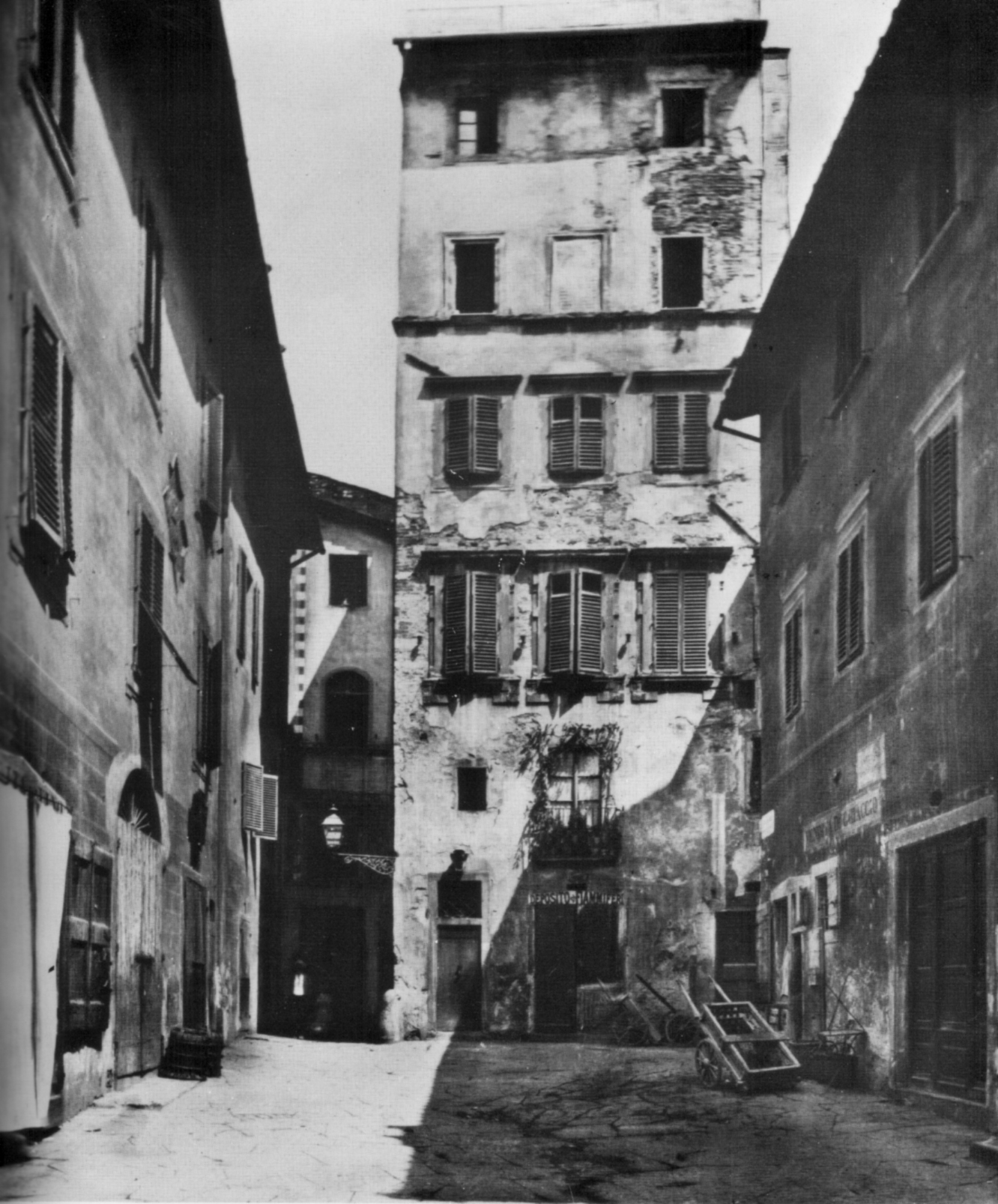
The Monte di Pietà dei Pilli in Florence, in a 19th-century photograph

Pawnbroking, lending money on portable security, began in ancient history. The practice was widespread in many parts of the world, from ancient Greece to medieval China and medieval Europe.

== Mosaic law ==
Mosaic law precluded pawnbroking as it forbade the acceptance of interest from a poor borrower, and Jews were forbidden to lend money at interest to each other, although they could charge interest to non-Jews. Until the Reformation, Christians were also forbidden to lend to each other for interest.

== China ==
The earliest Chinese pawnbrokers, in the 5th century, were established, owned, and operated by Buddhist monasteries; only later were they more widely seen. They were known by a number of names. Changshengku (长生库, long-life treasuries) originally referred to Buddhist monasteries in general. Other terms included jifupu (seen in Tang texts), didangku (Song period), and jiedianku (Yuan period). During the Southern Song dynasty, wealthy lay people sometimes formed partnerships with Buddhist monasteries and opened pawnshops (avoiding property taxes from which monasteries were exempt). A 1202 document records ten people forming a ju (局), which would support the establishment of a pawnshop in a monastery. In the late Qing and Republican China era (1840-1949), Chinese pawnbrokers employed flexible strategies to extend their business to a wide range of social members. Various measures such as relationship building, strategic philanthropy, and social value advancement were adopted to improve pawnbroking industry's and pawnbrokers' social image.

== Ancient Greece and Rome ==
Pawning was common in Ancient Greece and Rome; most contemporary law on the subject is derived from Roman sources. Many pawnbrokers were professional or semi-professional and operated from private shops. Under Roman law, certain items (such as wearing apparel, furniture, and instruments of tillage) could not be pledged. The emperor Augustus converted the proceeds from property confiscated from criminals into a fund from which the state lent money without interest to those who pledged valuables equal to double the amount borrowed.

== Medieval Europe ==
Jewish and Christian pawnbrokers and money-lenders, the latter often referred to as Cahorsins and Lombards, were common in medieval Europe, where they were often tolerated by authorities, despite opposition from the Catholic Church.

Pawnbroking spread to England with the Norman conquest. Many pawnbrokers in England were Jewish, and despite services rendered (often to the Crown), they were often unpopular, prompting greater restrictions and eventually the Expulsion of Jews from England in 1290. The expulsion of Jewish pawnbrokers enabled Lombard merchants to settle in England. Edward III pawned his jewels to the Lombards to raise money for his war with France in 1338, and Henry V did the same in 1415.

In medieval Italy, the pledge system arose which became almost universal in Europe. The system was benevolent, with early "mounts of piety" established in the 15th century, lending money to the poor without interest if the money was covered by the value of the pledges.

Similar systems began at Freising in Bavaria in 1198 and at Salins in Franche-Comté in 1350 (which charged 7.5% interest) and in London in 1361, where Michael Northburgh, Bishop of London, bequeathed 1000 silver marks for the establishment of a free pawnshop. These early efforts, like the later Italian ones, failed. The Vatican, therefore, allowed the Sacri monti di pietà to charge sufficient interest to cover their expenses. A controversy arose about the legality of charging interest, which was settled by Pope Leo X. At the tenth sitting of the First Council of the Lateran, Leo declared that the pawnshop was a lawful and valuable institution and threatened dissenters with excommunication. The Council of Trent confirmed his decision, and Charles Borromeo later suggested the establishment of state or municipal pawnshops. These gradually replaced the private licensed pawnbrokers throughout much of Europe.

Long before this, however, monti di pietà commonly charged interest for loans in Italy. They were established by 1464, when the earliest recorded monti (at Orvieto) was confirmed by Pius II. Three years later, another was opened in Perugia by the Franciscans Barnabus Interamnensis and Fortunatus de Copolis. They amassed the necessary capital by preaching, and the Perugian pawnshop earned a substantial profit at the end of its first year. After Barnabus' death in 1474, they were supported by Bernandino di Feltre (another Franciscan). Monti di pietà were opened in Assisi, Mantua, Parma, Lucca, Piacenza, Padua, Vicenza, Pavia and a number of smaller towns.

The Dominicans unsuccessfully denounced pawnshops. Viterbo opened one in 1469, and Sixtus IV confirmed another in his native town in Savona a decade later.

In Florence, the municipality and the Jews opposed Bernandino. Savonarola, a Dominican, established the first Florentine pawnshop after local theologians declared that charging interest was not a sin. Despite papal acceptance, the first pawnshop in Rome was only opened (by a Franciscan) in 1539.

== Early Present Period ==
=== Europe ===
From Italy, pawnshops gradually spread across Europe. Augsburg adopted the system in 1591, Nuremberg copied the Augsburg regulations in 1618, and by 1622 pawnshops were open in Amsterdam, Brussels, Antwerp and Ghent. Madrid followed suit in 1705, when a priest opened a charitable pawnshop with five pence from his poor box.

The institution was very slow in obtaining a footing in France. It was adopted at Avignon in 1577, and at Arras in 1624. The doctors of the once powerful Sorbonne could not reconcile themselves to the lawfulness of interest, and when a pawnshop was opened in Paris in 1626, it had to be closed within a year. Then it was that Jean Boucher published his Défense des monts de piété in favor of pawnbroking. Marseille obtained one in 1695, but it was not until 1777 that the first mont de pit was founded in Paris by royal patent. Statistics for the first few years of its existence show that in the twelve years between 1777 and the Revolution, the average value of the pledges was 42 francs 50 centimes, which is double the present average. The interest charged was 10% per annum, and large profits were made upon the 16 million livres that were lent every year.

Borrowing money, secured by deposited goods, was first regulated in the Low Countries in 1600. Albert VII and his wife Isabella, governors of the Spanish Netherlands under Philip III, lowered the interest rate from 32 3/4 to 21 3/4 percent. They introduced the monte de piedad in 1618, and in a dozen years the institution was established in nearly all large Belgian towns. Interest was fixed at 15 percent before it was reduced and restored to almost the original rate. Some towns also had charitable funds for interest-free loans. Shortly after the monte de piedad was introduced in the Spanish provinces, prince-bishop of Liège Ferdinand of Bavaria followed the archdukes' example. The original rate was 15 percent, when the Lombard money-lenders had been charging 43 percent. The prince-bishop's montes de piedad were so successful that their interest rate did not exceed five percent until 1788, when it was increased by one-half percent.

=== Britain and Ireland ===
The Lombards were unpopular, and Henry VII harassed them. The Act Against Brokers 1603 (1 Jas. 1. c. 21) was passed in 1604, and remained in force until 1872. It was aimed at counterfeit brokers, of whom there were many in London. This type of broker was considered a receiver of stolen goods; the act provided that no sale (or pawn) of stolen jewels, plate or other goods to a pawnbroker in

Under Charles I, another act of Parliament asserted that a pawnbroker was not a respectable (or trustworthy) person; however, it was planned to set Charles up in the business. The Civil War was approaching; supplies were badly needed, and a Royalist proposed the establishment of a state pawnshop. According to the proposal, "The intolerable injuries done to the poore subjects by brokers and usurers that take 30, 40, 50, 60, and more in the hundredth, may be remedied and redressed, the poor thereby greatly relieved and eased, and His Majestie much benefited". The king would receive two-thirds of the profits, and the working capital (£100,000) would be provided by the city of London. Reform of what Shakespeare called "broking pawn" was in the air at the time, and in the early days of the Commonwealth of England a mont de pieté was proposed in Observations manifesting the Conveniency and Commodity of Mount Pieteyes, or Public Bancks for Relief of the Poor or Others in Distress, upon Pawns (a 1651 pamphlet). According to A Short History of the Bank of England, published in 1695, the directors of the early Bank of England intended to help the poor by establishing pawnshops at an interest rate of one penny per pound per month (five percent per year). (Note: In old British sterling currency, there were 240 pennies in a pound.)

Suspicion of pawnbrokers continued during the 18th century, when the Sale of Spirits Act 1750 (24 Geo. 2. c. 40) ended the custom of publicans lending money on pledges so their customers could drink. Their reputation was also harmed by the Charitable Corporation, which demonstrated that pawnbroking encouraged dishonesty by giving thieves an opportunity to sell stolen goods and allowed a person planning bankruptcy to purchase goods on credit and dispose of them for cash (defrauding their creditors). The Pawnbrokers Act 1785 (25 Geo. 3. c. 48) licensed pawnbrokers for £10 in London and £5 in the country; the interest rate was set at 1/2 percent per month, and the length of loans was confined to one year.

== Late 19th century ==
=== Britain and Ireland ===
==== 1800–1872 ====
Modern pawnbroking legislation began with the Pawnbrokers Act 1800 (39 & 40 Geo. 3. c. 99). Lord Eldon, who admitted that he had used pawnshops in his youth, was influential in its passage. The pawnbrokers were grateful, and for many years after Lord Eldon's death they toasted him at their dinners. The act increased the interest rate to 1 2/3 percent per month (20 percent per year, unless unpaid interest increased the debt). Loans could be granted for a year, but pledges might be redeemed up to 15 months; the first week of the second month would not count for interest.

During its 72-year history, the act was amended three times:

- By the Stamp Act 1815, licence fees were raised to £15 in London and £7 10s in the countryside.
- In 1840, an act of Parliament abolished rewards to informers for reporting illegal rates of interest.
- By the Pawnbrokers Act 1860 (23 & 24 Vict. c. 21), pawnbrokers were allowed to charge a halfpenny for a pawn ticket when a loan was under five shillings.

The chief provisions of the act were unpopular, and the Pawnbrokers' National Association and the Pawnbrokers' Defence Association worked to obtain its liberalization. It was argued that the usury laws had been abolished for the entire community except for pawnbrokers who loaned less than £10, who were prevented from lending money on bulky articles requiring large storage space. In 1870 the House of Commons appointed a select committee on pawnbrokers, which heard testimony that during the previous year 207,780,000 pledges were lodged (30–40 million in London). The average value of pledges was about four shillings, and the number of articles pawned dishonestly was reportedly one in 14,000. Later, official statistics indicate that of forfeited pledges sold in London, less than 20 per million were claimed by the police.

==== Pawnbrokers Act 1872 ====
The result of the select committee's work was the Pawnbrokers Act 1872 (35 & 36 Vict. c. 93), which repealed, altered and consolidated all previous legislation and continues to regulates the relationship between the public and pawnbrokers. Based on an Irish law passed by Parliament, it removed restrictions and reduced the licence fee in London from £15 to the £7 10s paid in the provinces. According to the act (which does not affect loans above £10),

- A pledge is redeemable within one year, with a seven-day grace period.
- Pledges pawned for 10s or less and not redeemed in time become the property of the pawnbroker.
- Pledges above 10s are redeemable until sale, which must be by public auction.
- In addition to one halfpenny for the pawn ticket (sometimes not charged for very small pawns), the pawnbroker is entitled to charge interest one halfpenny per month on every 2s (or part of 2s) lent if the loan is under £2 and on every 2s 6d if the loan is above £2.
- Special contracts may be made for loans over £2, at a rate of interest agreed on between lender and borrower.
- The following are summary offences:
  - Unlawful pawning of goods not the property of the pawner.
  - Taking an article from a person under age twelve or intoxicated.
  - Taking linen, apparel or unfinished goods or materials.
- A new pawnbroker must produce a magistrate's certificate to be licensed.
- A licence cannot be refused if the applicant presents sufficient evidence of good character.
- The word "pawnbroker" must be inscribed in large letters over the shop door.

Provisions in the act safeguard the interests of borrowers whose unredeemed pledges are sold. Sales (by auction) take place only on the first Monday of January, April, July and October, and on the following days if needed.

Pawnbroking spread in popularity in Britain as a result of the Industrial Revolution, and the National Pawnbrokers Association was founded in 1892 to represent the industry. Annual interest on loans of 2s. had been increased by successive acts of Parliament from six percent in 1784 to 25 percent in 1800 and 27 percent in 1860. An English mont de piété was once proposed by the Salvation Army and in 1894 the London County Council considered a municipal effort, but neither came to fruition.

==== Scotland and Ireland ====
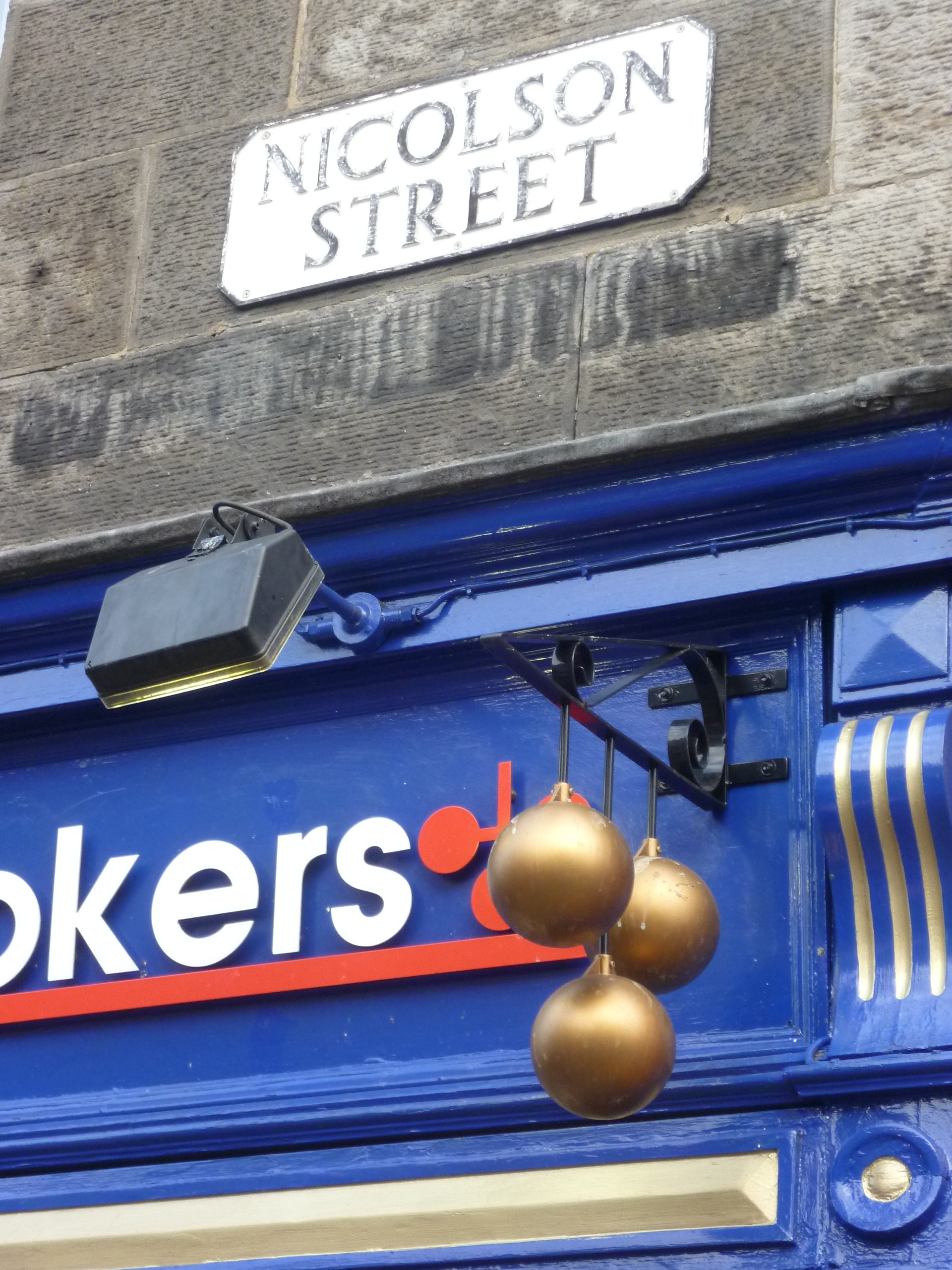
Pawnbroker's sign in Edinburgh, 2011

During the early 19th century, there was only one pawnbroker in Ireland; in 1833, there were 52, rising to 312 by 1865. Glasgow and Edinburgh probably contained nearly as many. In Ireland, the interest rates for loans are nearly identical to those charged in England, but a penny (instead of a halfpenny) is charged for the ticket. Articles pledged for less than IR£1 must be redeemed within six months, but nine months are allowed for amounts between 30s and £2. For sums over £2 the period is a year, as in England. In Ireland, a fraction of a month is calculated as a full month for interest; in England, fortnights are recognized after the first month. In 1838, there was an effort to establish monts de piété in Ireland; in 1841, the eight charitable pawnshops had a negative balance of £5,340. By 1847, only three were left, which also eventually collapsed.

=== United States ===
Pawnbrokers are strictly regulated. Each pawnbroker must have a criminal background check. Those pawning items must present a photo ID and are often asked for a thumbprint. Criminals know to avoid pawnshops since the items purchased or pawned are reported to the police each day. Many crimes are solved when pawnshop owners turn in a list of the items pawned or purchased when the match up with a stolen item on a police database. Each state has its own regulations, with those of New York and Massachusetts fairly representative.

Pawnbrokers are usually licensed by the mayor or by the mayor and aldermen; in Boston, however, they are licensed by the police commissioner. In New York, permits are renewable annually and a pawnbroker must file a surety bond with the state. Business is conducted on much the same lines as in England. Loans are made for four months, with an additional 30-day grace period. Exceeding the interest rate is a misdemeanor. Unredeemed pledges may be sold at any time after the loan expires. New York has one pawnshop for every 12,000 residents. In Massachusetts, unredeemed pledges may be sold four months after the date of deposit. The licensing authority fixes the interest rate, which may vary for different amounts. In Boston, every pawnbroker must submit a daily list of pledges taken (including the time and amount lent) to the police. Pawnshop chains include Cash America International and First Cash Financial Services, both headquartered in Texas.

=== Europe ===
The fact that on the continent of Europe monts de piété are almost invariably either a state or a municipal monopoly necessarily places them upon an entirely different footing from the British and American pawnshop. Compared with the English system, the customary European system is elaborate and cumbersome; slow in its operation, and based upon the supposition that the borrower carries in his pockets papers testifying to his identity. On the other hand, European custom limits the interest on large loans, where in the English system the rate of interest on a "special contract" of £2 or more may be high, and often is. The pawning system of loans is, to be fair to both systems, always expensive, either in actual interest or in collateral disadvantages; this remains true whether the lender is a for-profit pawnbroker or a government mont de pit.

==== The Netherlands and Belgium ====
The montes de piedad were undermined by the French Revolution but were re-established under French dominion, and for many years the laws governing them were altered by the French, Dutch and Belgian governments. Pawnbroking is regulated by an 1848 law, supplemented by an 1891 constitution for the Mont-de-Piété of the city of Brussels dating from.

The working capital of these official pawnshops is furnished by charitable institutions or the municipalities, but the Brussels one possesses a certain capital of its own in addition. In het Nederlands, the rate of interest charged in various parts of the country varies from 4 to 16%. In Belgium the rate is around 6,5%. The management is very similar to that of the French Monts-de-Piété (crédit municipaux), but the arrangements are much more favorable to the borrower. The initial term of a loan contract is unually 6 or 12 months. In the Netherlands, private pawnbrokers flourish side by side with the municipal Banken van Leening, nor are there any limitations upon the interest that may be charged. The rules of the official institutions are very similar to those of the monts de pit in the Latin countries, and unredeemed pledges are sold publicly 15 months after being pawned. A large proportion of the advances are made upon gold and diamonds; workmen's tools are not taken in pledge, and the amount lent varies from 8d. upwards. On condition of finding such sum of money as may be required for working capital over and above loans from public institutions, and the caution money deposited by the city officials, the municipality receives the profits.

==== Germany ====
Pawnbroking in Germany is conducted at once by the state, by the municipalities, and by private enterprise; but of all these institutions the state loan office in Berlin is the most interesting. It dates from 1834, and the working capital was found, and still continues to be in part provided, by the Prussian State Bank. The profits are invested, and the interest devoted to charitable purposes. The maximum and minimum rates of interest are fixed, but the rate varies, and often stands at about 12%. Two-thirds of the estimated value is the usual extent of a loan; four-fifths is advanced on silver, and five-sixths on fine gold. State and municipal bonds may be pledged up to a maximum of L150, the advance being 80% of the value, and a fixed interest of 6% is charged upon these securities. The values are fixed by professional valuers, who are liable to make good any loss that may result from over-estimation. The bulk of the loans are under five, and the state office is used less by the poor than by the middle classes. Loans run for six months, but a further six months' grace is allowed for redemption before the article pledged can be sold by auction. The net annual profit usually amounts to little more than 1% upon the capital employed.

==== Austria-Hungary ====
Pawnbroking laws of Austria-Hungary were similar to those of England. Free trade exists, and the private trader, who does most of the business, must obtain a government concession and deposit caution-money from 80 to 800, according to the size of the town. He must, however, compete with the monts de pit or Versatzaemter, which are sometimes municipal and sometimes state institutions. The chief of these is the imperial pawn office of Vienna, which was founded with charitable objects by the emperor Joseph I in 1707, with half of the annual surplus paid to the Vienna poor fund. Here, as in Berlin, the profits are relatively small. Interest is charged at the uniform rate of 10%, which is calculated in two-week periods, however speedily redemption may follow upon pawning. For small loans varying from two to three kronen, 5% only is charged. The Hungarian state and municipal institutions appear, on the whole, to compete somewhat more successfully with the private firms than is the case in Vienna.

==== Italy ====
In Italy, the country of origin of the mont de piété, the institution still flourishes. It is, as a rule, managed by a committee or commission, and the regulations follow Italy fairly closely the lines of the one in Rome, which never lends less than fod. or more than 40. Four-fifths of the value is lent upon gold, silver and jewels, and two-thirds upon other articles. The interest, which is reckoned monthly, varies with the amount of the loan from 5 to 7%, but no interest is chargeable upon loans up to 5 lire. A loan runs for six months and may be renewed for similar periods up to a maximum of five years. If the renewal does not take place within two weeks of the expiration of the ticket, the pledge is sold, any surplus there may be being paid to the pawner. When more than 10 lire are lent there is a charge of 1% for the ticket. Agencies of the mont de pit are scattered about Rome, and carry on their business under the same rules as the central office, with the disadvantage to the borrower that he has to pay an agent's fee. The amount to be advanced by a municipal pawnshop is fixed by an official called the commissaire-priseur, who is compelled to load the scales against the borrower, since, should the pledge remain unredeemed and be sold for less than was lent upon it, he has to make good the difference. This official is paid at the rate of 3/4% upon loans and renewals, and 3% on the amount obtained by the sales of forfeited pledges. The borrower has to pay an agents fee of 2%, which is deducted from the loan. Private pawnshops also exist in Italy, under police authority; but they charge very high interest.

==== France ====
The National Assembly destroyed the monopoly of the Paris monti de pietà, but it struggled on until 1795, when the competition of the money-lenders compelled it to close its doors. So great, however, were the extortions of the usurers that the people began to clamour for its reopening, and in July 1797 it recommenced business with a fund of ~20,000 found by five private capitalists. At first, it charged interest at the rate of 36% per annum, which was gradually reduced, the gradations being 30, 24, 18, 15, and finally 12% in 1804. In 1806 it fell to 9%, and in 1887 to 7%. In 1806 Napoleon I re-established its monopoly, while Napoleon III, as prince-president, regulated it by new laws that are still in force. In Paris the pledge-shop is, in effect, a department of the administration; in the French provinces it is a municipal monopoly; and this remark holds good, with modifications, for most parts of the continent of Europe.

The Paris mont de piété undertakes to lend four-fifths of the intrinsic value of articles made from the precious metals, and two-thirds of that of other articles. The maximum and minimum that may be advanced are also fixed. The latter varies in different parts of the country from one to three francs, and the former from a very small sum to 10,000 francs that is the rule in Paris. Loans are granted for 12 months with right of renewal, and unredeemed pledges may then be sold by auction, but the proceeds may be claimed by the borrower at any time within three years. Pledges may be redeemed by instalments.

In Paris the rate charged is 7%, and even then the business is conducted at a loss except in regard to long and valuable pledges. Some of the French provincial rates are as high as 12%, but in almost every case they are less than they were prior to the legislation of 1851 and 1852. The French establishments can only be created by decree of the president of the Republic, with the consent of the local conseil communal. In Paris, the prefect of the Seine presides over the business; in the provinces, the mayor is the president. The administrative council is drawn one-third each from the conseil communal, the governors of charitable societies, and the townspeople. A large proportion of the capital required for conducting the institutions has to be raised by loan, while some part of the property they possess is the product of gifts and legacies. The profits of the Paris mont de pit are paid over to the Assistance Publique, the comprehensive term used by France to indicate the body of charitable foundations. Originally this was the rule throughout France, but now many of them are entirely independent of the charitable institutions. Counting the head office, the branches and the auxiliary shops, the Paris establishment has its doors open in some 50 or 60 districts; but the volume of its annual business is infinitely smaller than that transacted by the London pawnbrokers. The amount to be advanced by a municipal pawnshop is fixed by an official called the commissaire-priseur, who is compelled to load the scales against the borrower, since, should the pledge remain unredeemed and be sold for less than was lent upon it, he has to make good the difference. This official is paid at the rate of 3/4% upon loans and renewals, and 3% on the amount obtained by the sales of forfeited pledges. This is obviously the weakest part of the French system.

Somewhere between 40 and 50 French towns possess municipal pawnshops, a few of which, like those of Grenoble and Montpellier, having been endowed, charge no interest. Elsewhere the rate varies from nil in some towns, for very small pledges, to 10%. The constant tendency throughout France has been to reduce the rate. The great establishment in Paris obtains part of its working capital reserves and surplus forming the balance by borrowing money at a rate varying from 2 to 3% according to the loan term (duration). By law, the Paris mont de pit makes advances upon securities at 6%, plus a duty of 5 centimes upon every hundred francs. The maximum that can be lent in this way is 20. Up to 80% is lent on the face value of government stock and on its own bonds, and 75% upon other securities; only 60% may be advanced on railway shares. These advances are made for six months. Persons wishing to borrow a larger sum than 16 francs from the Paris mont de pit have to produce their papers of identity. In every case, a numbered metal check is given to the customer, and a duplicate is attached to the article itself. The appraising clerks decide upon the sum that can be lent, and the amount is called out with the number. If the borrower is dissatisfied he can take away his property, but if he accepts the offer he has to give particulars of his name, address, and occupation. Experts calculate that every transaction that involves less than 22 francs results in a loss to the Paris mont de pit—only those that exceed 85 francs are profitable. The average loan is under 30 francs.

==== Spain ====
Monts de piété in Spain were closely connected with savings banks. The system grew until in 1840 the mont de pit began to receive the sums deposited in the savings bank, which had just been established, for which it paid 5% interest. In 1869 the two institutions were united. This official pawnshop charged 6% upon advances for periods varying from four to twelve months, according to the nature of the article pledged, and a further months grace was allowed before the pledges were sold by auction. Private pawnbrokers were also common, especially in Madrid, often with much higher rates of interest but which made larger advances than their official rivals, and which did business during more convenient hours.

==== Portugal ====
In Portugal the monte pio is an amalgamation of bank, benefit society and pawnshop. Its business consists chiefly in lending money upon marketable securities, but it also makes advances upon plate, jewelry, and precious stones, and it employs officially licensed valuers. The rate of interest varies with the bank rate, which it slightly exceeds, and the amount advanced upon each article is about three-fourths of its certified value. There is in Portugal a second class of loan establishment answering exactly to the English pawnshop. The pawnbroker is compelled to deposit a sum, in acceptable securities, equal to the capital he proposes to embark, and the register of his transactions must be submitted quarterly to the chief of the police for examination. As regards small transactions, there appears to be no legal limit to the rate of interest. The sale of unredeemed pledges is governed by the law affecting the monte pio geral.

==== Russia ====
In imperial Russia the state maintained two pawnbroking establishments, one at St Petersburg and the other at Moscow, but only articles of gold and silver, precious stones and ingots of the precious metals are accepted by them. Advances are made upon such securities at 6% per annum, and the amounts of the loans are officially limited. Loans run for twelve months, with a months grace before unredeemed pledges are put up to auction. The bulk of this class of business in Russia was, however, conducted by private companies, which advance money upon all descriptions of movable property except stocks and shares. The interest charged was not allowed to exceed 1% per month, but there is an additional charge of 4% per month for insurance and safekeeping. The loan runs for a year, with two months grace for redemption before sale. There were also pawnshops conducted by individuals, who find it very difficult to compete with the companies. These shops can only be opened by a police permit, which runs for five years, and security, varying from 100 to 700, has to be deposited; 2% per month is the limit of interest fixed, and two months grace is allowed for redemption after the period for which an article is pledged.

==== Denmark ====
Pawnbroking in Denmark dates from 1753, when the Royal Naval Hospital was granted the monopoly of advancing money on pledges and of charging higher interest than the law permitted. The duration of a loan is three months, renewals being allowed. The old law was extended in 1867, and now all pawnbrokers have to be licensed by the municipalities and to pay a small annual licence fee. The rate of interest varies from 6 to 12% according to the amount of the loan, which must not be less than 7d., and unredeemed pledges must be sold by auction.

==== Sweden ====
Sweden has no statutes specifically aimed at pawnbroking, with the exception of a proclamation by the governor of Stockholm that prohibits lending money on articles suspected being stolen. By the end of the 19th century individuals still carried on the business on a small scale, but the bulk of it was conducted by companies. For many years Stockholm had a municipal establishment that charged 10% for loans paid out of the city funds. The cost of administration was so great that the establishment suffered an annual loss, and so it was abolished in 1880 when a private company called the Pant Aktie Bank ('pawn bond bank') formed, with rivals soon following. The money was lent for three months, and at the end of five months the pledge, if unredeemed, was sold by auction under very carefully prescribed conditions.

In Norway a police licence was required for lending money on pawn where the amount advanced did not exceed 4, 10s. Beyond that sum no licence was necessary, but the interest charged could not exceed such a rate as the king may decide.

==== Switzerland ====
Switzerland tightly controlled pawnbroking, with licences authorised by the cantonal government and police able to inspect pawnbrokers' books. Pawnbrokers could only charge interest of 1% per month for six months, with further rules dictating the sale at auction of unredeemed pledges. Very few pawnbrokers existed in Switzerland, where it was more common for people to sell items to second-hand dealers in the hope of subsequently buying them back.

== Post-1945 ==
Pawnbroking declined after the Second World War due to an increase in social welfare provision by governments and consumer credit by banks. Many pawnbrokers attempted to modernise their image and diversify their businesses.

Since the 1980s the decline of pawnbroking has stabilised, and even increased in some areas, with many people using pawnbrokers as an alternative to bank or payday loans.

== Symbol ==
Symbol of pawnbrokers

The pawnbroker's symbol shows three balls suspended from a bar and has been widely used since the mid-18th century. The origins of the symbol are unclear, but it is often attributed to the Medici family of Florence, Italy. The family insignia featured rounded objects, which may have represented gold coins or rocks. According to one legend, a Medici employed by Charles the Great slew a giant using three bags of rocks. Since the Medici family were so successful in the financial, banking, and money-lending industries, other families also adopted the symbol. Throughout the Middle Ages, coats of arms bore three balls, orbs, plates, discs, coins and more as symbols of monetary success.

Another theory attributes the symbol to the Lombards. Pawn shop banking originated under the name of Lombard banking, and many European towns called the pawn shop the "Lombard". The three golden balls were originally the symbol medieval Lombard merchants hung up in front of their houses.

A third theory links the symbol to Saint Nicholas of Myra, the patron saint of pawnbrokers. According to legend, he gave a bag of gold to three poor girls to save them from destitution, and these three bags of gold became the three orbs of the symbol.

It has been conjectured that the golden balls were originally three flat yellow effigies of byzants, or gold coins, laid heraldically upon a sable field, but that they were presently converted into balls the better to attract attention.

In the late 20th century some pawnbrokers responded to a decline in the industry by removing the traditional symbol.

== See also ==
- Mount of piety (Mont de Piété)
