= Arisi =

Arisi is a surname. Notable people with the surname include:

- Alessia Arisi (born 1971), Italian table tennis player
- Sollecito Arisi (16th–17th centuries), Italian Augustinian friar and painter
