= Barnabas of Terni =

Italian Friar Minor and missionary

- Died: 1474 or 1477; Eremo delle Carceri, Monte Subasio
- Occupations: Friar Minor, Missionary
- Known for: Establishing the first monte di pietà

Barnabas of Terni (died 1474 or 1477) was an Italian Friar Minor and missionary, who established the first monte di pietà.

== Early life ==
He belonged to the noble family of the Manassei and was a Doctor of Medicine and well-versed in letters and philosophy before he entered the Order of Friars Minor in Umbria.

== Religious work ==
After devoting himself assiduously to the study of theology, Barnabas began to preach with wonderful success, but a severe illness obliged him to abandon this work. He was almost continually employed in different offices of importance. He proved himself a zealous promoter of that branch of the order known as the Observance.

== Founding of first mont de piété ==
After consulting his fellow religious Fortunatus Coppoli, who had been an eminent jurisconsult, and with the generous co-operation of the wealthy Perugians, Barnabas established the first Monte di Pietà, a charitable loan institution, in their city in 1462. Violent opposition ensued, but Barnabas and Fortunatus prevailed over their enemies at a public disputation. Barnabas next extended his work to other cities; it was enthusiastically taken up by several great Franciscan missionaries, and in their day, the monti di pietà wonderfully improved the social conditions of Italy.

== Death ==
He died at the Eremo delle Carceri on Monte Subasio at an advanced age and his remains were deposited there in the Chapel of St. Mary Magdalene. He is commemorated in the Franciscan martyrology on 17 February.

== See also ==
- Bernardine of Feltre
- Michele Carcano
