= James of the Marches =

Christian saint

Saint James of the Marches
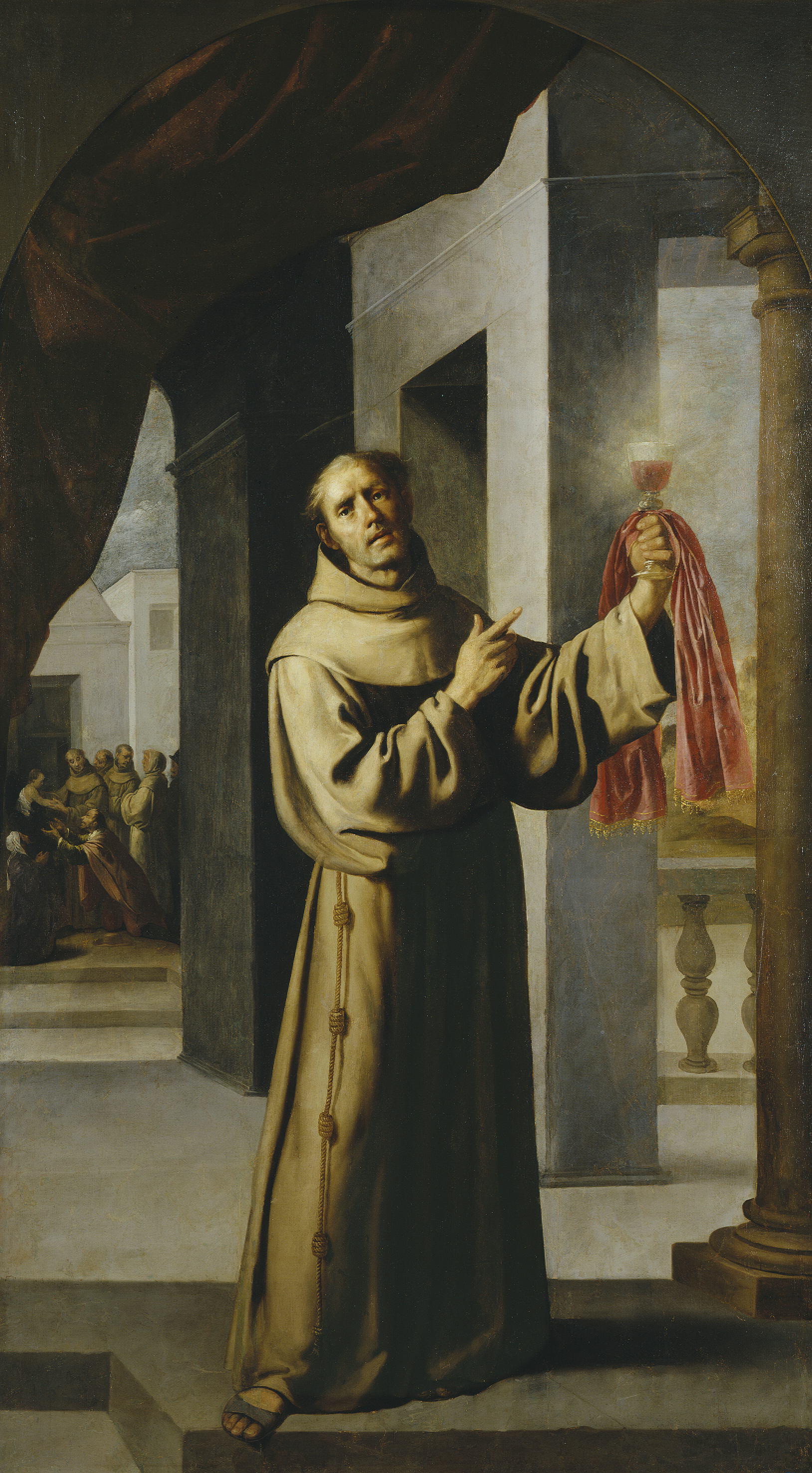
- Saint James of the Marches by Francisco Zurbarán

Confessor
- Born: c. 1392; Monteprandone, March of Ancona, Papal States
- Died: 28 November 1476; Naples, Kingdom of Naples
- Venerated in: Roman Catholicism (Franciscan Order)
- Beatified: 1624 by Pope Urban VIII
- Canonized: 1726 by Pope Benedict XIII
- Major shrine: Sanctuary of St. James of the Marches; Monteprandone, Ascoli Piceno, Italy
- Feast: 28 November
- Attributes: Depicted holding in his right hand a chalice, out of which a snake is escaping
- Patronage: Patron of Monteprandone, co-patron of Naples, Italy

Jacob de Marchia (Latin: Jacobus de Marchia, Italian: Giacomo della Marca; c. 1391 – 28 November 1476), commonly known in English as Saint James of the Marches, was an Italian Friar Minor, preacher and writer. He was a Papal legate and Inquisitor.

== Early life ==
He was born Dominic Gangala (Italian: Domenico Gangala) in the early 1390s to a poor family in Monteprandone, then in the March of Ancona (now in Ascoli Piceno) in central Italy along the Adriatic Sea. As a child, he began his studies at Offida under the guidance of his uncle, a priest, who soon afterwards sent him to school in the nearby city of Ascoli Piceno. He later studied at the University of Perugia where he took the degree of Doctor in Canon and Civil law. After a short stay at Florence as tutor for a noble family, and as judge of sorcerers, he was received into the Order of Friars Minor, in the chapel of the Portiuncula, in Assisi, on 26 July 1416. At that time, he took the monastic name Jacobus (Jacob, Jacopo; rendered James in English). Having finished his novitiate at the hermitage of the Carceri, near Assisi, he studied theology at Fiesole, near Florence, with John of Capistrano, under Bernardine of Siena. He began a very austere life fasting nine months of the year. Bernardine told him to moderate his penances.

== Priest and inquisitor ==
On 13 June 1420, he was ordained a priest and soon began to preach in Tuscany, in the Marches, and in Umbria; for half a century he carried on his spiritual labours, remarkable for the miracles he performed and the numerous conversions he wrought. He helped spread devotion to the Holy Name of Jesus. From 1427, James preached penance, combated heretics, and was on legations in Germany, Austria, Sweden, Denmark, Bohemia, Poland, Hungary, and Bosnia. He was also appointed inquisitor against the Fraticelli, a heretic sect that dissented from the Franciscans on the vow of poverty, among other things.

He was sent by the Papal Council as an Inquisitor to Bosnia in 1432–33, working in the Bosnian Vicariate. He returned in 1435 and served as Vicar of Bosnia until 1439. He combated the heresies that he found there, which earned him the hostility of its ruler, King Tvrtko II, and even more of his wife, Queen Dorothea, whom James accused of trying to poison him. He left Bosnia citing King Tvrtko I as the cause of failure of Franciscan mission. Between 1434 and 1439 he worked in Southern Hungary against heretics. In August, 1439, he imprisoned Bálint Újlaki, who first translated the Bible into Hungarian (Hussite Bible).

At the time of the Council of Basle, James promoted the reunion of the moderate Hussites with the Catholic Church, and later that of the Eastern Orthodox at the Council of Ferrara-Florence. Against the Ottomans, he preached several crusades, and at the death of John Capistran, in 1456, James was sent to Hungary as his successor. In 1457 he was sent to Danish king Christian I to discuss the Turkish crusade and also the Bohemian issue.

He instituted several montes pietatis (literally, "mountains of piety": nonprofit credit organizations that lent money at very low rates on pawned objects), and preached in all the greater cities. He was offered the bishopric of Milan in 1460, which he declined.

James belonged to the Observant branch of the Friars Minor, then rapidly spreading and stirring up much controversy. In this task, he encouraged reforms in the Order of Friars Minor. How much he suffered on this account is shown in a letter written by him to John Capistran. King Tvrtko II was a major opponent of James's reforms in Bosnia, and was probably strongly influenced in that regard by Queen Dorothy.

Under Pope Callistus III, in 1455, he was appointed an arbiter on the questions at issue between the Conventuals and Observants. His decision was published 2 February 1456 in a papal bull, which pleased neither part. A few years later, on Easter Monday 1462, James, preaching at Brescia, uttered the opinion of some theologians that the Precious Blood shed during the Passion was not united with the Divinity of Christ during the three days of his burial. The Dominican friar, James of Brescia, the local inquisitor, immediately summoned him to his tribunal. James refused to appear, and after some troubles appealed to the Holy See. The question was discussed at Rome during Christmas 1462 (not 1463, as some have it), before Pope Pius II and the cardinals, but no decision was ever given. James spent the last three years of his life in Naples, and died there on 28 November 1476.

== Writings ==
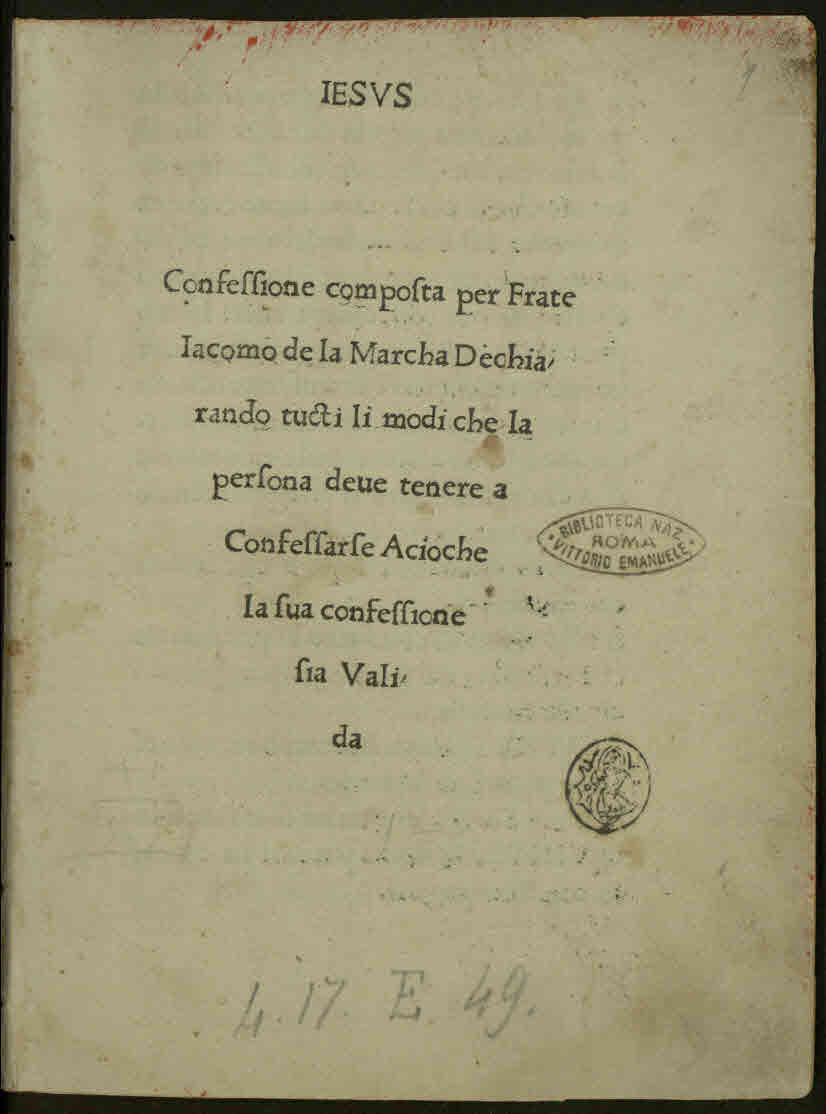
Confessione, 1476

His writings have not yet been collected. His library and autographs are preserved in part at the Municipio of Monteprandone (see Crivellucci, "I codici della libreria raccolta da S. Giacomo della Marca nel convento di S. Maria delle Grazie presso Monteprandone", Leghorn, 1889).

He wrote "Dialogus contra Fraticellos" printed in Baluze-Mansi, "Miscellanea", II, Lucca, 1761, 595-610 (cf. Franz Ehrle in "Archiv für Litt. u. Kirchengeschichte", IV, Freiburg im Br., 1888, 107–10).

His numerous sermons are not edited. For some of them, and for his treatise on the "Miracles of the Name of Jesus", see Candido Mariotti, "Nome di Gesù ed i Francescani", Fano, 1909, 125–34.

On his notebook, or "Itinerarium", See Luigi Tasso in "Miscellanea Francescana", I (1886), 125-26: "Regula confitendi peccata" was several times edited in Latin and Italian during the fifteenth century. "De Sanguine Christi effuse" and some other treatises remained in manuscript.

== Veneration ==
James was buried in Naples in the Franciscan church of Santa Maria La Nova, where his body remained until 2001. At the instigation of the provincial minister (Franciscan superior) of the Marches region, Ferdinando Campana, James's body was relocated to Monteprandone, where it remains incorrupt and visible to the public today. He was beatified by Pope Urban VIII in 1624, and canonized by Pope Benedict XIII in 1726. Naples venerates him as one of its patron saints. His liturgical feast day is observed by the Franciscan Order on 28 November. He is generally represented holding in his right hand a chalice, out of which a snake is escaping – an allusion to some endeavours of heretics to poison him or, less likely, to the controversy about the Precious Blood.

== Annotations ==
1. In English he is known as James of the Marches or James della Marca. He is also known by his surname and monastic given name as Jacob/Jacopo/James Gangala. Another name is Dominic/Domenico Gangala. "James" is a variant of both Jacobus and Giacomo. He is also known as Jacobus Picenus (after his birth place).

== Sources ==
Catholic Church titles
Preceded by John of Korčula	Vicar of Bosnia; 1435–1438	Succeeded by John of Waya
