= Bernardine of Feltre =

Italian Franciscan friar

Blessed Bernardine of Feltre O.F.M.
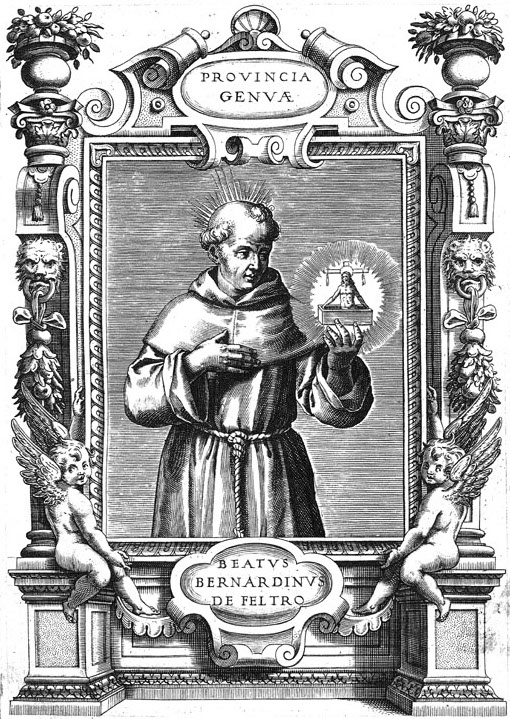
- Late 16th or early 17th century depiction of Bernardine of Feltre

Friar
- Born: Martin Tomitani; 1439; Feltre
- Died: 28 September 1494; Pavia
- Venerated in: Roman Catholic Church
- Beatified: 13 April 1654, Rome by Pope Innocent X
- Feast: 28 September
- Attributes: Monti di pietà Franciscan habit Flag

Bernardine of Feltre (sometimes Bernardinus of Feltre; 1439 – 28 September 1494) was a Friar Minor and missionary who was born in Feltre, Italy and died in Pavia. He is remembered in connection with the monti di pietà of which he was the reorganizer and, in a certain sense, the founder, together with Michele Carcano. The feast of Blessed Bernardino is kept in the Order of Friars Minor on 28 September.

He was beatified by Pope Innocent X on 13 April 1654 via the confirmation of his cult. The cause for his sainthood was opened on 7 April 1870.

== Life ==
Born Martin Tomitani, he belonged to the noble family of Tomitano and was the eldest of nine children. In 1456, while a law student in Padua, he heard James of the Marches preach the Lenten course and was inspired to enter the Franciscan order, taking the name Bernardino, after Bernardino of Siena. In May that year he joined the "Observantine" Franciscans, an austere branch of the Franciscan friars. He completed successfully his studies at Mantua and was ordained priest in 1463. He was small, shy, and stammered but his superiors assigned him to preach home-missions. Cured of an impediment in his speech, Bernardine began his apostolate up and down the Italian peninsula. Every city of note and every province from Lombardy in the north to Sardinia and the provinces of the south became successively the scene of his missionary labours.

He was an extremely popular preacher because he spoke simply and powerfully against the vanity, ambition and greed rife at the time. The crowds that flocked to hear him were too large for the local churches, so he addressed them in the city squares and the fields. Like many other missioners of his century, he had made a vast outdoor bonfire called "burning the Devil's stronghold". The crowds were asked to throw into the fire all objects of vanity and sin such as playing cards, dice, pornographic books and pictures, jewelry, wigs, superstitious charms, cosmetics, and so forth.

Bernardine was able to reconcile warring communities. He also sought civic legislation to correct public injustices such as usury, the charging of excessive interest for loans, which was especially onerous on the poor. In 1484, Bernardine established the charitable credit organization, mont-de-piétés run by a joint committee of clergy and laymen. The institution was founded as an alternative to the high interest loans of the money lenders and Lombard traveling bankers of the Middle Ages. His fund raising drives were generally preceded with a procession featuring an image of either the Man of Sorrows or Pietà to encourage charitable donations. His insistence on charging a low interest to protect the institution's permanency raised a controversy among the theologians who thought it promoted the continuance of usury. (In 1515, Pope Leo X declared the institution meritorious and it spread rapidly throughout France, Italy, and Spain.)

In 1491, Bernardine was expelled from Milan by Ludovico Sforza for contesting with the Duke's astrologer. He died in 1494 in the monastery of San Giacomo della Vernavola in Pavia and his relics are kept in the church of Santa Maria del Carmine in the same city.

== Antisemitism ==
With the practical notion of establishing monts-de-piété, he called for the expulsion of Jews all over Italy and Tyrol. However, no secular or ecclesiastical authorities specifically took up Bernardine's call. This led Bernardine to accuse the nobility of having sold out to Jehiel of Pisa, one of the wealthiest Jews in Italy. However, one effect of his preaching against usury was the outbreak of antisemitism in Trent based around the blood libel conspiracy against Jewish residents after the death of Simon of Trent. This led to the torture and execution of seventeen Jews and the expulsion of the remainder from that city, with no return for the next 300 years.

== Iconography ==
Bernardine is generally represented in iconography as carrying in his hand a monti di pietà, that is, a little green hill composed of three mounds and on the top either a cross or a standard with the inscription Curam illius habe (a snippet from the Vulgate translation of the Gospel of Luke's Parable of the Good Samaritan).

== Works ==
The authorship of the well-known Anima Christi has as often as not been ascribed to Bernardine of Feltre. The fact, however, that the Anima Christi was composed sometime before 1439 disproves any claim that he might have of being its author, though much like Ignatius of Loyola, Bernardine made frequent use of it and recommended it to his brethren.

== See also ==
- Barnabas of Terni
