= Mount of piety =

Institutional pawnbroker run as a charity

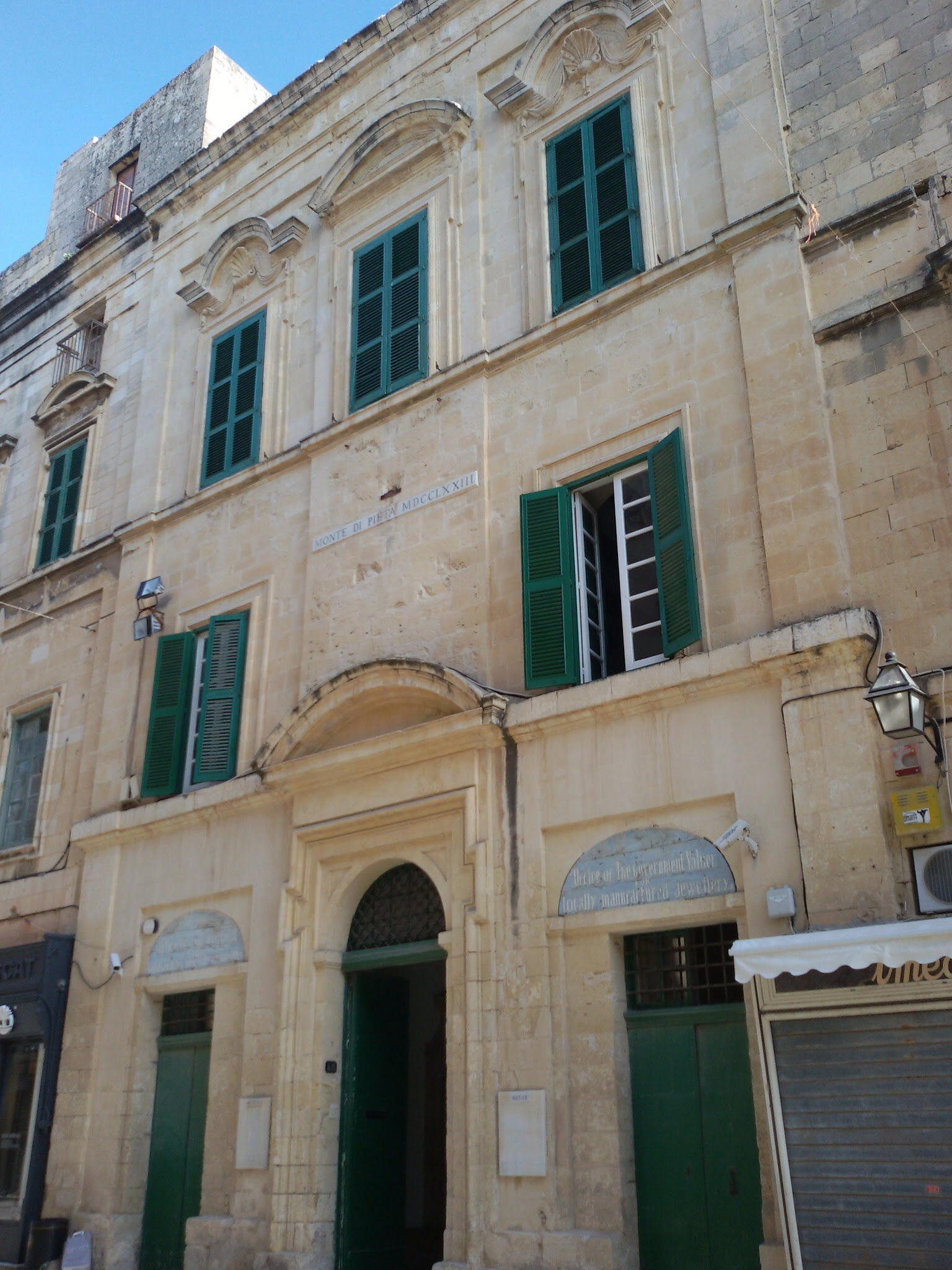
The Monte di Pietà in Valletta, Malta, which is still in operation today

A mount of piety is an institutional pawnbroker run as a charity in Europe from Renaissance times until today. Similar institutions were established in the colonies of Catholic countries; the Mexican Nacional Monte de Piedad is still in operation.

The institutions called monte di pietà originated in 15th-century Italy, where these institutions gave poor people access to loans with reasonable interest rates. It used funds from charitable donors as capital, and made loans to the poor so they could avoid going to exploitative lenders. Borrowers offered valuables as collateral, making the mount of piety more like a pawn shop than a bank.

== History ==
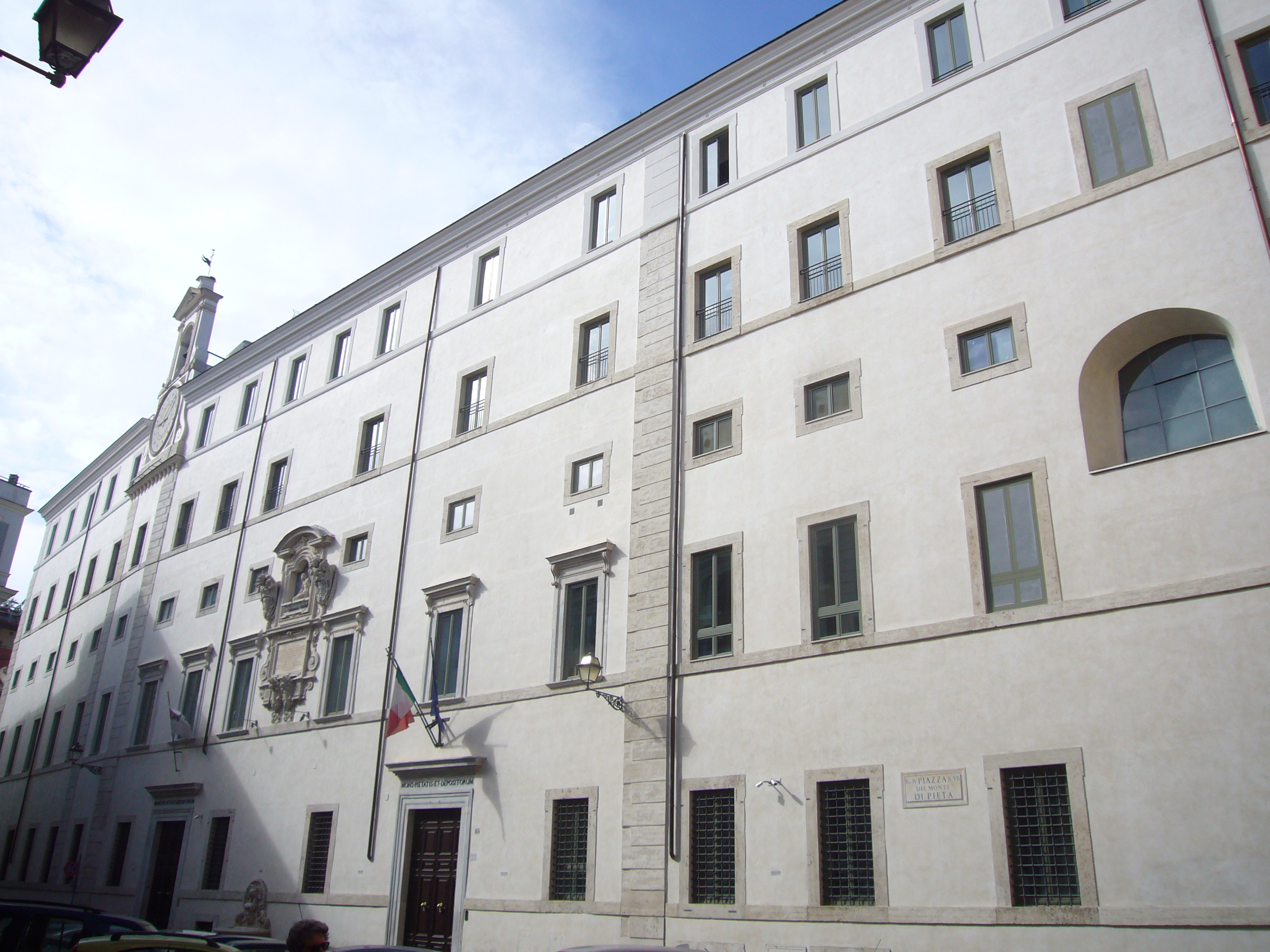
Monte di Pietà building in Rome, rione Regola

The concept of Mount of Piety was first developed in 15th-century Italian cities as an early form of organized charity, intended as a reform against money lending and the related sin of usury associated with Cahorsins and Lombards. It was primarily promoted by Franciscans such as Barnabas of Terni, Bernardine of Feltre, and Michele Carcano.

The public office was organized and operated by the Catholic Church and offered financial loans at a moderate interest to those in need. The organizing principle, based on the benefit of the borrower and not the profit of the lender, was viewed as a benevolent alternative to the loans provided by moneylenders. The organization of the Monte di Pietà depended on acquiring a monte, a collection of funds from voluntary donations by financially privileged people who had no intentions of regaining their money. The people in need would then be able to come to the Monte di Pietà and give an item of value in exchange for a monetary loan. The term of the loan would last the course of a year and would only be worth about two-thirds of the borrower's item value. A pre-determined interest rate would be applied to the loan and these profits were used to pay the expenses of operating the Monte di Pietà.

Over succeeding centuries such organizations spread throughout the continent of Western Europe, a credit to the preaching of Franciscans and their condemnation of usury, with later support by both Dominican preachers and humanist intellectuals of the fifteenth century.

=== Italy ===
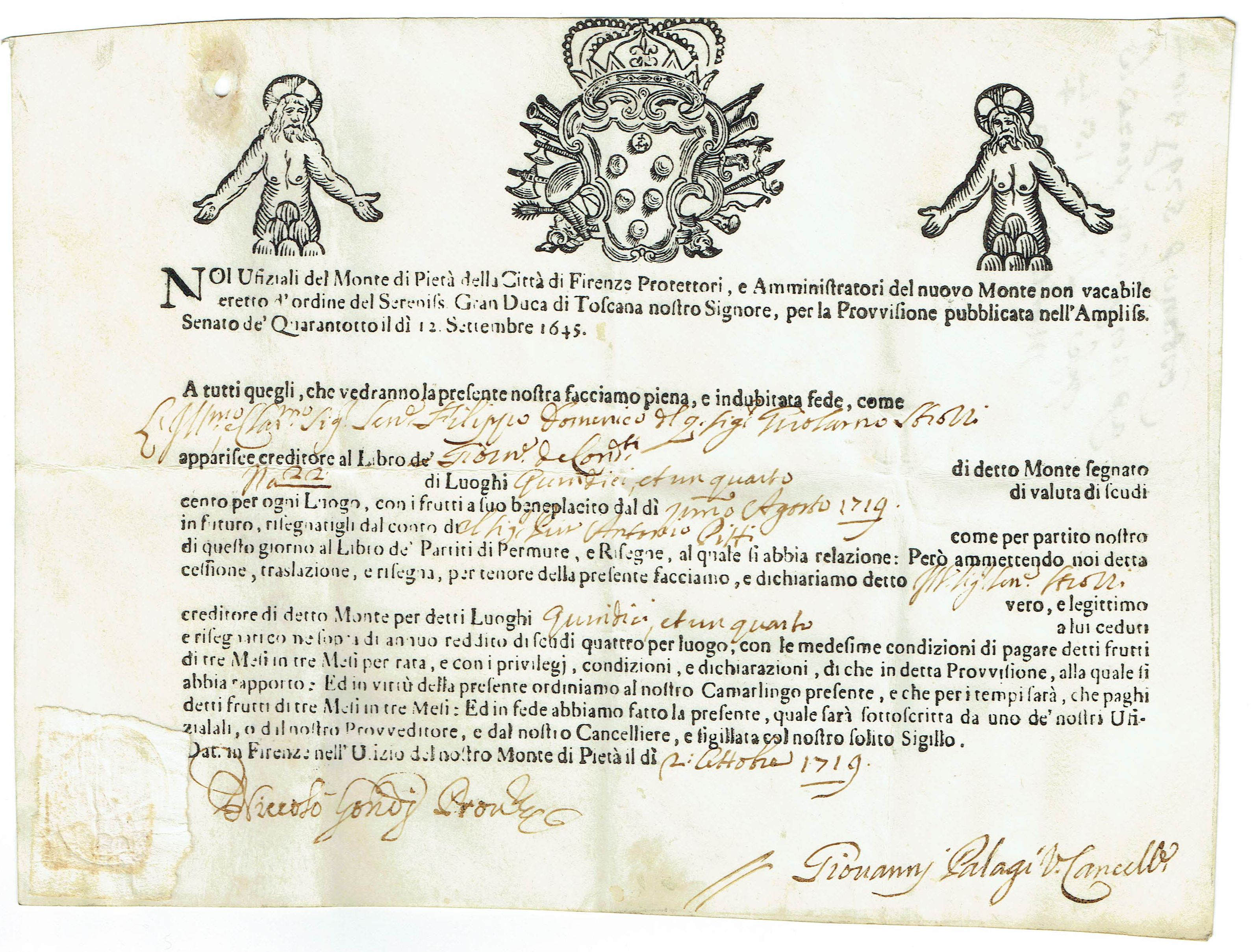
Obligation of the Monte di Pietà della Citta di Firenze, issued 21 October 1719

In 1462, the first recorded Monte di Pietà was founded in Perugia. Between 1462 and 1470, an estimated forty more were developed. The Franciscan Marco di Matteo Strozzi preached about the benefits of a Monte di Pietà in combating usury. He left a set of memoirs that outlined his goal to rid the city of Jewish money lenders and to replace them with Christian pawn shops which allowed the poor to acquire cheap credit.

In Rome, Pope Sixtus V (1585–90) founded in 1585 the local Monte di Pietà in via dei Coronari. Moved later near Campo de' Fiori to the piazza bearing its name, it still exists.

=== England ===
The first institution was started in 1361 by the Bishop of London, Michael Northburgh, who left 1,000 marks of silver for the establishment of a bank that should lend money on pawned objects, without interest, providing that the expenses of the institution be defrayed from its foundation capital. He had the monies deposited in a chest in the body of St Paul's and directed that if in any case at the end of the year the sums borrowed were not repaid, then the preacher at Paul's Cross should in his sermon declare that the pledge would be sold within fourteen days, if not redeemed forthwith. The capital was eventually consumed, and the bank closed.

=== Malta ===
Malta's Monte di Pietà was set up in 1598, initially under the name Monte di Sant'Anna. It was merged with the Monte della Redenzione degli Schiavi in 1787, becoming known as the Monte di Pietà e Redenzione. The Monte di Pietà is still in operation today as part of the Inland Revenue Department.

=== Belgium ===
The Brussels Mont de Piété, first founded in 1618, is still an active institution. The founder was Wenceslas Cobergher, who went on to establish fifteen such institutions in different towns in the Spanish Netherlands in the years between 1618 and 1633, financed by the provision of annuities in return for direct capital investment. Prior to this date the provision of consumer credit was largely in the hands of Lombards whose loans were at high rates of interest. Criticism of the Monts de Piété as themselves usurious institutions that both borrowed and lent at interest were countered by the Jesuit moral theologian Leonardus Lessius in an appendix to the 1621 edition of his De justitia et jure.

== Organization ==
=== Employees ===
A massaro or massaio had the duty of overseeing the daily interactions between the borrowers that came to the Monte di Pietà and the other employees. If the item was believed to be the legal property of the borrower two assistants called scrivani collected the pawn from the borrower. After examining and recording details about the condition of the object, it would then be passed to assessors who would evaluate the item's value. The massaro would then make three copies of a numbered receipt that identified the owner's name, the type of object being pawned, the condition of the object, the object's value, the amount of the loan and the date. Generally, the loan would not exceed two-thirds of the object's value. Of the three receipts, one would be given to the owner-borrower, another would be kept in the massaro's record book and one would be attached to the item.

The monetary funds would then be supplied by the cashier to the borrower. This employee had the duty of keeping their own records of the money collected, loaned and the interest on each loan. During the first year of operations, the Monte di Pietà did not grant loans more than twenty-five lire to people who lived in the city and ten lire to people who lived in the rural area five miles from the city. This restriction was expected to increase as more funds were acquired from voluntary and involuntary donations. If a borrower wanted to regain his pawned item, he would have to return the receipt to the massaro. The cashier would then calculate the interest that was earned on the item and the borrower would have to pay the interest in order to redeem their pawn. This interest collection provided one of the sources of revenue for the daily functions, operations, and salaries of the Monte di Pietà.

The Monte di Pietà's employees were responsible for keeping track of the daily operations of the organization. Strict regulation dictated both their work and personal life. For example, fines were imposed for improper or dishonest behaviour. The actual space of the "Monte di Pietà was regarded as a pious and religious house" and therefore stage plays, dances, games and other festivities were forbidden.

The employees’ salaries came from the income generated by the interest payments on loans. The massaro earned 120 florins per year, the cashier was paid 80 florins, the massaro's two assistants received 30 florins each, the assessors received 40 florins each, and the two servants earned 24 florins each.

=== Borrowers and lenders ===
The Monte di Pietà accumulated capital from members of the patrician class, middle class, corporate groups, guilds, fines resulting from lawsuits and Communed ordered resources. One of the most creative strategies that preachers used in Florentine to acquire more capital for their “monte” was to declare Palm Sunday as a day for donations in the form of alms. The “monte” was supposed to be gathered from "gifts or donations in honour of a person’s love for God". Some scholars hypothesize that members of the artisan class and widows would freely give some money towards the “monte” upon hearing a sermon condemning usury and proclaiming the need to help the poor.

While some monetary deposits were voluntary, some people had no choice in funding the capital for the “monte”. For example, Monna Margherita da Poppi of 1497 gave 40 lire to the Monte di Pietà as part of her sentence in a legal matter. The Monte di Pietà was in charge of keeping this money from her until she was married. In this case, the organization of the Monte di Pietà was a dowry fund which became popular during the mid-sixteenth century. More revenues for the “monte” were acquired from the state through ordered fines.

== Rules and regulations ==
Before the Monte di Pietà actually operated, a group of "eight men assembled to draw up the statutes" of the Florentine monte di pietà on April 15, 1496. The eight who gathered were Niccolò de’ Nobili, Piero de’ Lenzi, Bernardo de’ Segni, Niccolò de’ Nero, Piero de’ Guicciardini, Giacopo de’ Salviati, Antonio di Sasso di Sasso and Diacopo Mannucci. It was the members of the patrician class that dominated the prestigious and well paid positions of decision making concerning the Monte di Pietà.

Since the purpose of the Monte di Pietà was to combat usury, there were clear guidelines regarding the operations of the organization. For example, the employees had to ensure that all items that were exchanged were free, and therefore the legal property of the person pawning it. Also, there were guidelines regarding the kind of items that were permitted, and the amount a person could borrow, both in terms of time and quantity. For example, holy items and unfinished goods such as pieces of cloth were not accepted as pawns for loans.

== Impact on society ==
The Monte di Pietà was developed on the principle of charity. It was designed to aid less fortunate people by providing an alternative to the socially unaccepted Jewish money lending system. However, Jewish banks continued to exist with the Monte di Pietà and they each catered to a distinctive clientele.

== Difference from montepío ==
The Mount of Piety is a different organisational form from the so-called montepío, which appeared during the second half of the 18th century. The Montepío was a mutual, agnostic, and government-controlled institution established by craftsmen or lesser standing professionals to care for members' needs when disabled or rehabilitating. They operated under a patron saint and in a church or monastery but without any religious obligation (and many had an ephemeral life).

== See also ==
- Caritas in Veritate for Pope Benedict XVI's reference to this early practice of pawnbroking in paragraph 65.
- Christian finance
- History of pawnbroking
- Monte delle doti
