= San Giacomo della Vernavola =

Church in Pavia, Italy

Santa Giacomo della Vernavola
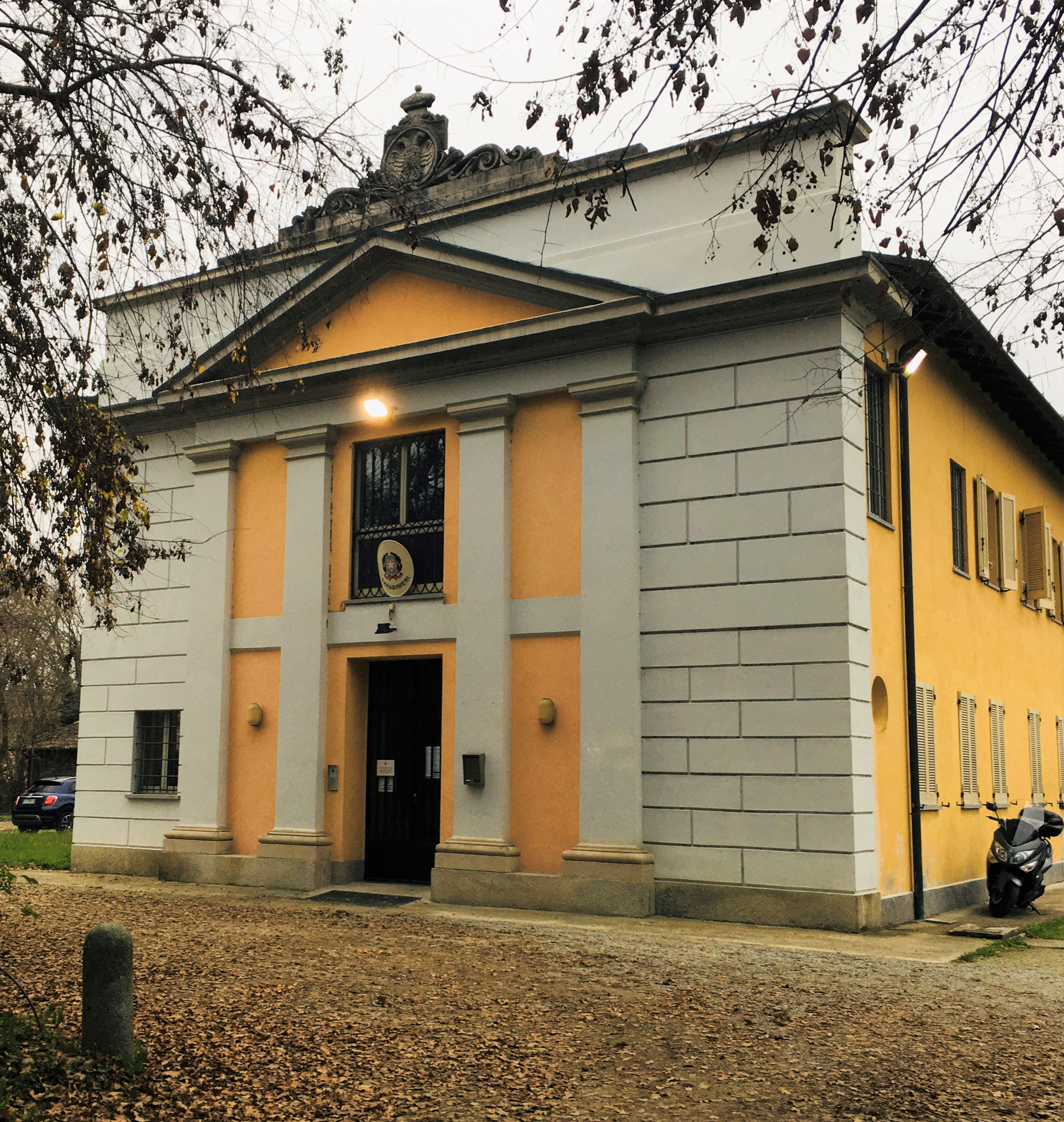

Religion
- Affiliation: Catholic
- Province: Pavia
- Year consecrated: 12th century

Location
- Location: Pavia, Italy
- Interactive map of Santa Giacomo della Vernavola
- Coordinates: 45°11′20″N 9°10′27″E

Architecture
- Completed: 1730

San Giacomo della Vernavola was a monastery located along the small river Vernavola outside the walls of Pavia.

== History and architecture ==
The monastery was built in the 12th century and belonged to the Benedictine order. In 1217 Pope Honorius III granted several privileges to the monastery and, in 1384, Gian Galeazzo Visconti had the church restored and embellished. In 1421 the bishop of Pavia Pietro Grassi donated the monastery to the Order of Friars Minor, who in 1458 had the church rebuilt, making it frescoed by Vincenzo Foppa. In 1478 he came to San Giacono della Vernavola, Bernardine of Feltre, the future Blessed, who, after several moves, settled permanently in the monastery in 1493 where he died the following year, and his cell is still preserved inside the buildings that made up the monastery. In October 1524 the monastery was occupied by the army of the king of France Francis I during the siege of Pavia. For long months, until the battle of February 1525, the friars had to accommodate contingents of Swiss mercenaries in the service of the king of France. The church was renovated in 1730ː the vault and the walls were frescoed by Pietro Antonio Magatti, while the chapels were enriched by large paintings by Carlo Antonio Bianchi, Johann Christoph Storer and Francesco Bianchi. In 1805 the monastery was suppressed by decision of the Kingdom of Italy, and in 1806 it became the Agricultural Garden of the Faculty of Agronomy of the University of Pavia. In 1808 the church, the bell tower and the cloister were demolished, while in 1838 the south façade of the neoclassical building was built to a design by Giuseppe Marchesi. On the top of the tympanum of the facade is still the double-headed eagle in Viggiù stone, symbol of the Austrian Empire. In 1859, with the passage of Lombardy from the Austrian Empire to the Kingdom of Italy, the Faculty of Agriculture was closed, and the complex became home to the geophysical observatory of the University of Pavia, so much so that a geodynamic pavilion was built. In 1994 the former monastery was ceded by the University of Pavia to the Carabineri Command of the Forest, Environmental and Agri-food units. Of the ancient monastery are preserved, in addition to the cell of Blessed Bernardine of Feltre and the surrounding wall, also a chapel with a porch of the 16th century, in which remains of frescoes persist.
