= James of Brescia =

Italian Dominican theologian

- Occupations: Theologian; Dominican friar
- Known for: Dominican theologian and inquisitor in 15th century

James of Brescia was an Italian Dominican theologian of the fifteenth century.

He entered the Dominican Order at Brescia, his native city, and in 1450 was appointed to the office of inquisitor. He aided the papal auditor, Bernardo da Bosco, in putting an end to the teaching of impious doctrines at Bergamo.

Brescia also took a prominent part in the controversy between the Dominicans and the Minorites with regard to the Precious Blood. During Easter Week, 1462, St. James of the Marches, a celebrated Minorite preacher, maintained in a sermon at Brescia that the Blood separated from the Body of Christ during His Passion was thereby separated from His Divinity, and consequently was not entitled to adoration during the time that Christ remained in the sepulchre. As this doctrine had been proscribed by Pope Clement VI in 1351, James of Brescia cited James of the Marches to appear before his tribunal in case he should not retract. A dispute at once arose between the Dominicans and Friars Minor.

Shortly before, in a papal bull written at Tivoli, Pope Pius II had declared that it was not contrary to Christian faith to hold that Christ did not reassume a part of the blood he shed in his passion. This declaration narrowed down the controversy to the question: Whether the Blood which Christ shed in his passion and reassumed at his resurrection was adorable as the blood of the Son of God during the three days that it was separated from his body. The affirmative was maintained by the Dominicans, the negative by the Minorites.

The pope ordered a solemn disputation to be held before the pontifical court at Christmas, 1462 (1463, according to many). James of Brescia was one of three theologians who represented the Dominicans. Among the Minorite champions was Francesco della Rovere, later Pope Sixtus IV. After a debate of three days, a consultation was held by the pope and the cardinals, but no definitive decision was pronounced.

In a Constitution dated 1 August 1464, two weeks before his death, Pius forbade all further disputation on the subject. A full presentation of the Dominican side of this controversy is preserved in an unpublished treatise written by James of Brescia and his two colleagues. Other theological works attributed to James are no longer extant.

== Notes ==
Attribution
