= Lombard credit =

Type of short-term secured lending

Lombard credit (or lombard loan) is a form of short-term secured lending, characterized by loans against movable collateral, today mostly in the form of account balances, securities or life insurance policies. The lombard rate is a central bank lending rate charged to commercial banks for short-term loans with securities pledged as collateral.

The term derives from the Lombard merchants and bankers from Northern Italy who systematized and expanded these techniques in medieval European trade networks, particularly in Lombardy and Tuscany.

In the US, the Lombard rate was set at the top of the Federal Open Market Committee target range for the federal funds rate on March 16, 2020.

== Etymology ==
The term originally comes from the Lombards, a people who conquered Italy in the 6th century, and settled in the northern region that became known as Lombardy. The wealthy cities in this region were the birthplace of modern banking, and many Lombard bankers became notable in the Middle Ages throughout Western Europe as financiers, moneylenders and pawn-brokers. For example, London's Lombard Street (1598) owes its name to Lombard bankers.

The term "Lombard loan" is a historiographical construct or retrospective description rather than contemporaneous terms. Medieval banking texts typically used more specific terminology like "conditional sale" (vendita condizionale), "pledge" (pegno), or described specific lending practices without a unified term.

While Lombard merchants were innovative financial actors in medieval Italy, they didn't uniquely "invent" secured lending. Similar practices existed notably in ancient Mesopotamian civilizations, Roman financial systems, and Islamic banking traditions. The term "Lombard" became a generalized descriptor for sophisticated financial practices associated with Northern Italian merchant banking, more than a literal invention claim.

== Controversy ==
One prominent role of Lombard credit is in use by the Federal Reserve System of the United States of America ("Fed"). Traditionally, the bank rate, or the rate charged by the Fed to member banks in need of funds (ostensibly to maintain the required reserve ratio), was lower than the target federal funds rate, or the rate charged among banks for the same type of overnight credit. This meant that banks could borrow from the central bank at a lower rate than they could from each other, which somewhat conflicts with the central bank's role as a "lender of last resort". A discount rate lower than the rate typically charged by another bank opened the possibility of arbitrage and thus required extra scrutiny of potential borrowers. The Fed switched to a so-called "Lombard facility," in which the discount rate is higher than the targeted federal funds rate, thus creating an economic incentive for banks to look elsewhere before asking to borrow from the Fed.

A 2011 economic brief from the Federal Reserve Bank of Richmond said many bank executives and market participants attach a stigma to borrowing from the discount window, so while the vast majority of federal funds loans occur below the discount rate (at or near the target federal funds rate), in some instances banks have paid above-market rates (particularly, rates at or even above the discount rate) for federal funds.

== Private client lombard lending ==
Lombard lending is used by private banks to help support wealthy investors. Banks such as UBS, Barclays, Julius Baer, JP Morgan, Rothschild, etc., offer their UHNW clients access to lending secured against their investments. The major benefits of Lombard lending are that investments do not have to be sold, and thus do not trigger capital gains tax. As they are secured against high quality liquid assets, they are often at lower rates. Funds can be accessed quickly.. Traditionally, Lombard lending can be accessed only by HNW or UHNW individuals who hold their assets at a private bank. Firms such as Firenze make this available without minimum investment requirements and regardless of where the assets are held.

== See also ==
- Lombard banking
- Bank rate
- Pawnbroker
- Repo
