= Yves Renouard =

French historian

Yves Laon Emile Adrien Renouard (17 February 1908 – 15 January 1965) was a French medieval historian. He was professor at the University of Paris from 1955 until his death.

Educated at the École normale supérieure in Paris, Renouard passed his agrégation in history in 1932, then spent five years in Italy, first at the École française de Rome, then at the Institut français de Florence. He joined the Université de Bordeaux in 1937, teaching there (with two interruptions, the first to serve in the French Army during the Second World War; the second on a temporary attachment to the Sorbonne) until 1955. He was the dean of the Faculté de lettres from 1945. In 1955, he became a professor at the University of Paris, where he remained until his death.

Renouard was elected a Corresponding Fellow of the British Academy in 1964.
