= Sollecito Arisi =

Italian painter

Sollecito Arisi (active late 16th and first half of 17th century) was an Italian Augustinian friar and painter, active in Lodi.

He appears to have trained with the School of Cremona, and his style recalls that of Giovanni Battista Trotti. He frescoed the library of the Augustinian convent in Lodi, but the work was destroyed in the 19th century. In Lodi, he also painted an Adoration of the Magi (1596) for the church of Sant'Agnese; a St Francis receives the stigmata with donors (1611) for the church of San Francesco, and a Visitation of Mary and Elizabeth with Sts Joseph and Zaccarias (1651) for the church of the Chiesa della Beata Vergine del Carmine in Lodi, Lombardy.
