= Lombard banking =

Type of medieval banking

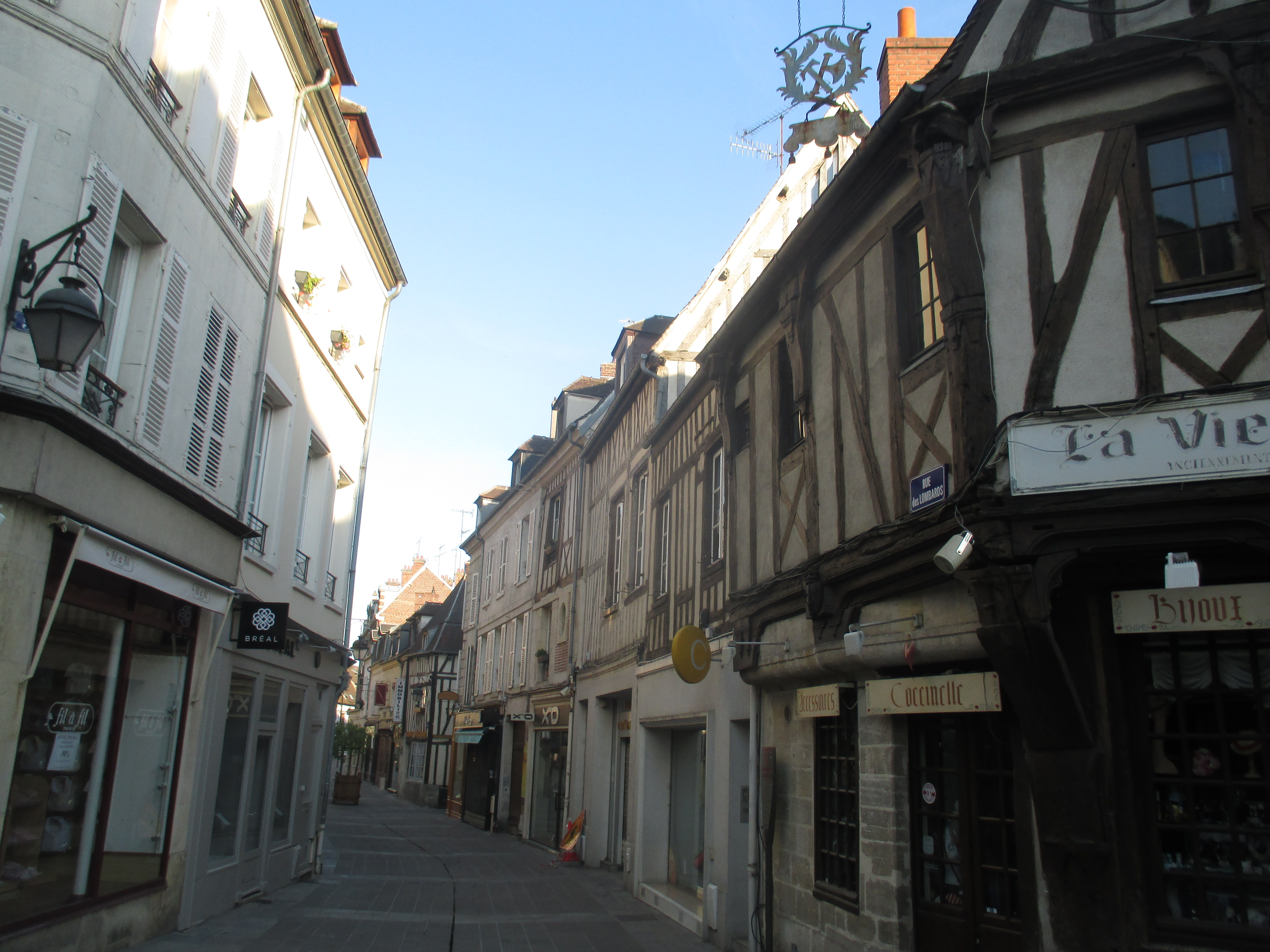
Rue des Lombards in Compiègne, France

Lombard banking refers to the business of Italian moneylenders generally referred to as "Lombards" (in medieval times Northern Italy was referred as Lombardy, a much larger region than the modern Lombardy). The term was often used in a derogatory sense, as Lombard banking was associated with the sin of usury.

== History ==
Lombard lenders became active throughout Western Europe in the 13th and 14th centuries, emigrating from major merchant centers in Tuscany such as Florence, Lucca and Siena, and in Northern Italy such as Milan or Genoa but also from smaller cities such as Asti in Piedmont. They often displaced the French Cahorsins, even though there is much confusion in documentary sources between the two communities. In some regional contexts, the two words "Lombard" and "Cahorsin" were used interchangeably until the latter gradually fell into disuse from the 14th century.

A Catholic prohibition on profit from money without working made most forms of lending sinful. Pope Leo I forbade usury by canon law. Even so, it was not per se forbidden to take collateral on loans. Pawn shops thus could operate on the basis of a contract that fixes in advance the "fine" for not respecting the nominal term of the "interest free" loan, or alternatively, may structure a repurchase agreement by the borrower, where the interest is implicit in the repurchase price. Similar conventions exist in modern Islamic banking. Various ways around the prohibition were devised, so that the lowly pawnshop contractors could bundle their risk and investment for larger undertakings. Christianity, Judaism, and Islam generally ban usury. The necessity of credit for functioning European economies was such that the Church's ban on usury was routinely undermined, "Despite the ban on usury, no medieval European government - municipal, territorial, or national - was able to function without borrowing...But such loans were usually for short terms, often at punitive rates of interest".

The prominent position of the Lombards in Christian finance eroded with the Protestant Reformation. In the 18th century many bankers and shipping agents in England were Quakers. The term "Lombard" for pawnshop (or pawnshop owner) remained in use well into the late 18th century.

== Legacy ==
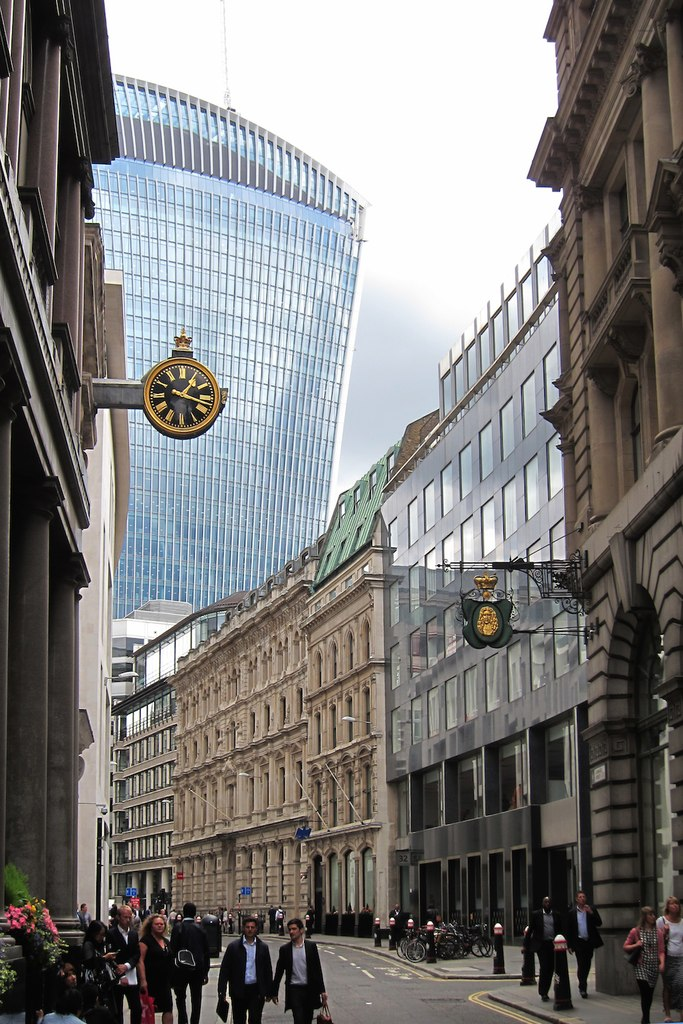
Lombard Street in London

In modern central banking practice, Lombard credit refers to central bank lending against marketable securities, such as government bonds. Modern repurchase agreements are also forms of Lombard lending: one bank sells marketable securities to another (at a discount), with an agreement to repurchase the securities (typically at par) in a fixed period of time. Although the legal documentation of the transaction is that of a sale and subsequent repurchase, the substance of the transaction is a secured loan (and under most accounting standards, will be treated as a loan).

Modern financial firm names that refer to Lombard banking include Lombard North Central and TS Lombard in the UK as well as Lombard Bank in Malta.

Numerous European cities still have a street named Lombard Street after the Lombard bankers who once resided there, as do several American port cities. These include rue des Lombards in Paris; Lombard Street, London; Lombard Street (San Francisco); Lombard Street (Baltimore); and similarly named streets in other cities including Aachen, Amiens, Antwerp, Bergen op Zoom, Boston, Brussels, Châlons-en-Champagne, Compiègne, Dublin, Évreux, New Orleans, Nîmes, Philadelphia, Portland, Oregon, Portsmouth, and Toronto.

In Dutch, the name for a pawn shop is still lommerd. In Ukrainian, Polish and Russian, a pawn shop is similarly called lombard.

== See also ==
- Lombard Street: A Description of the Money Market
- Cahorsins
- Mount of piety
- History of pawnbroking
- List of banks in Italy
