= San Francesco, Lodi =

Church in Lodi, Italy

Coordinates: 45°18′53.01″N 9°30′28.92″E

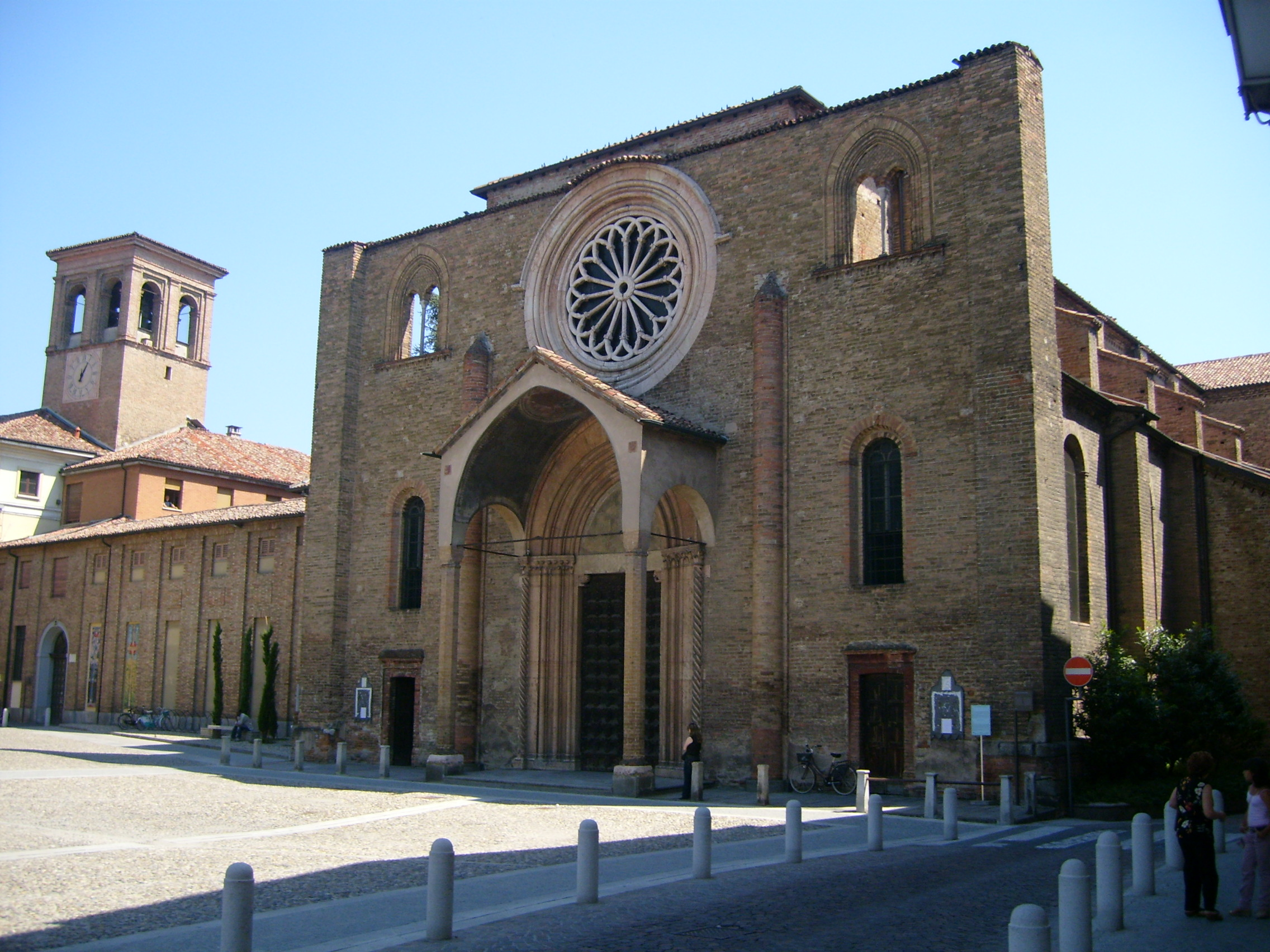
Façade of the church.

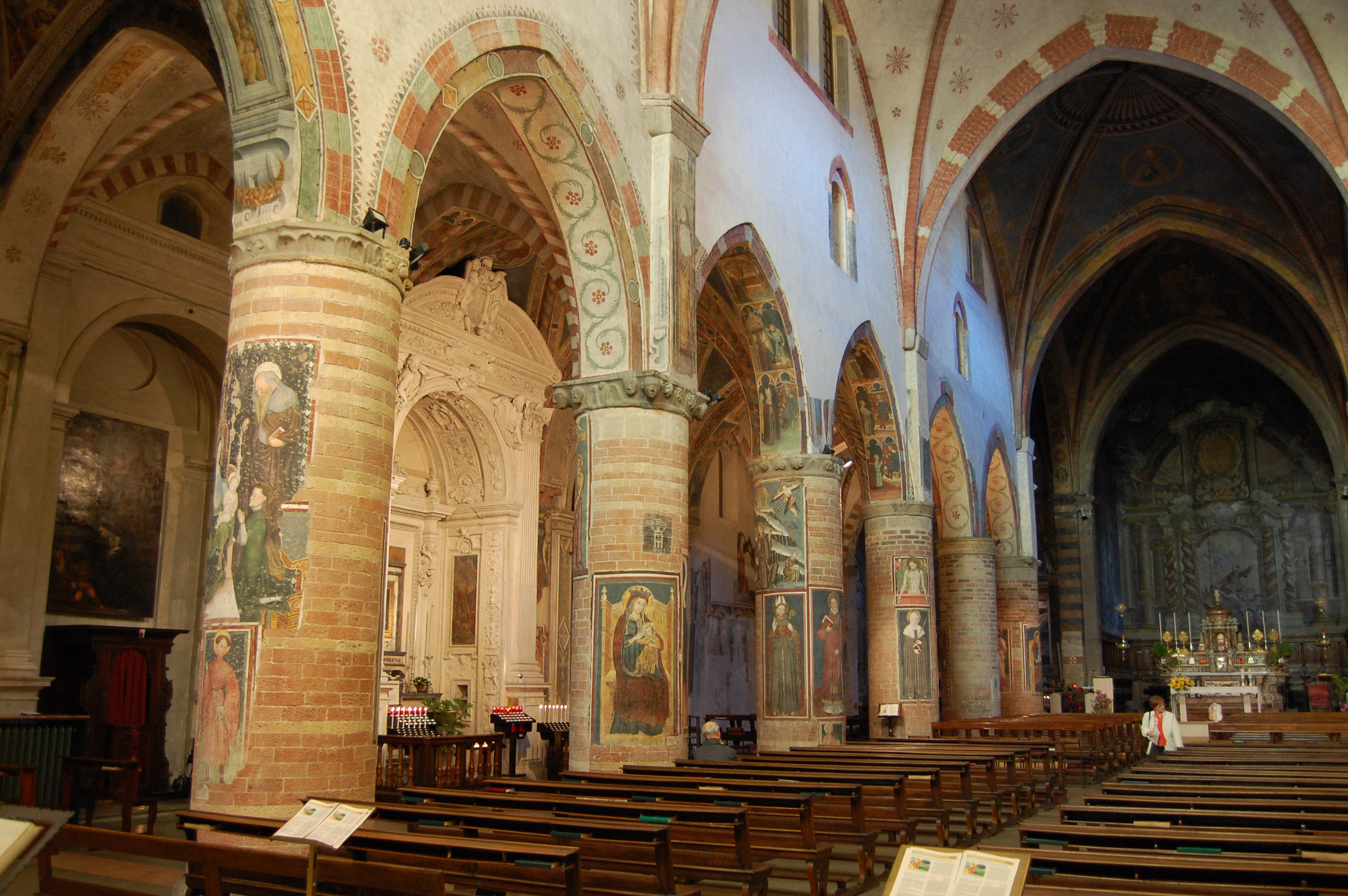
View of the interior.

San Francesco is a church in Lodi, Lombardy, northern Italy, dating to the late 13th century. Its main peculiarity are the two "open sky" double mullioned windows in the façade, which are the first example of a model often repeated in northern Italy in the 14th and 15th centuries.

== History ==
The church was built between 1280 and the early 14th century, on the site a small church of the Minor Friars dedicated to St. Nicholas. The construction was commissioned by the Lodi bishop Bongiovanni Fissiraga.

In 1527 it was assigned to the Reformed Franciscan Order of St. Bernardino, who, in 1840, were replaced by the Barnabites. In the first years of their tenure, they carried on a wide restoration program, which was completed in 1842.

== Description ==
The church has an unfinished façade in cream-color brickwork, charactersized by a tall ogival cusped portico, also in brickwork. This is flanked by two blind columns and surmounted by a large rose window in white marble, in turn sided by two double ogival mullioned windows.

The wide interior is on the Latin cross plan, divided into a nave and two aisles with four spans each; there are also side chapels. The nave and the aisles are cross-vaulted, separated by ogival arches supported by large brickwork columns. Walls and columns are decorated by numerous frescoes dating from the 14th to the 18th century; among the many 14th century ones, particularly renowned are the Madonna with Child, Saints and Antonio Fissiraga from an unknown Lombard master. In the right aisles are 16th-century frescoes depicting Madonna with St. Francis, St. Bonaventure and a Donor by the local painter Sebastiano Galeotti, a collaborator of Callisto Piazza.

Among the 16th- and 17th-century paintings are included a Saint Anthony meeting Ezzelino III da Romano by il Malosso, St. Francis Receiving the stigmata by Sollecito Arisi and a Madonna of Caravaggio by Enea Salmeggia.

The church contains the tombs of several notable people, including the poet Ada Negri and the naturalist Agostino Bassi.
