= Cahorsins =

Merchant-bankers in the High Middle Ages

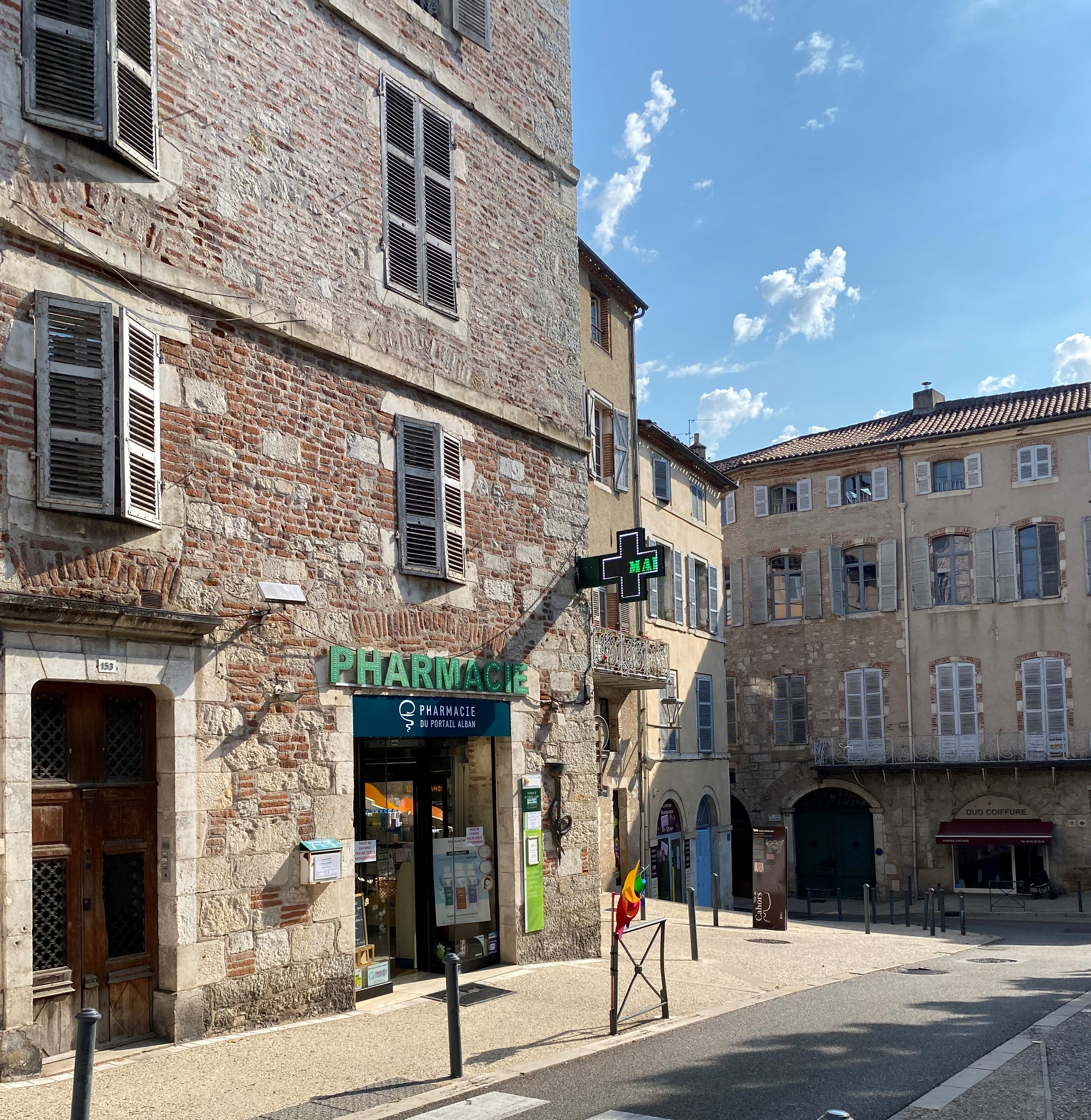
Place de la Libération, formerly known as place au Change, in Cahors, in the Middle Ages a hub of activity of the Cahorsins

The Cahorsins were merchants and financiers from the French city of Cahors and the surrounding region of Quercy during the High Middle Ages. During their 13th-century heyday, they were among the most prominent communities of Christian long-distance traders outside of Italy, and were particularly prominent in commerce between England and its continental lands of the Duchy of Aquitaine. They declined rapidly from around 1300 CE, but their name long remained synonymous with usury in much of Western Europe.

== Name ==
The names of Cahors and the Quercy both derive from the Cadurci people who inhabited the region during the Iron Age and Roman period.

In medieval parlance, Cahorsins, alternatively spelled Caorcins, Caorsins, Caoursins or Cahursins, included merchants from Cahors but also Cajarc, Capdenac, Cardaillac, Castelnau-Montratier, Figeac, Gourdon, Rocamadour, and Souillac. They were referred to as Caorsini in Italian, Cahorsijnen in Dutch, and Kawertschen in German. In English, Caursines was occasionally used in the past but not in recent historical literature.

In the modern period, possibly because of the negative connotations associated with the Cahorsins' lending practices, people from Cahors have been instead referred to as Cadurciens.

== Overview ==
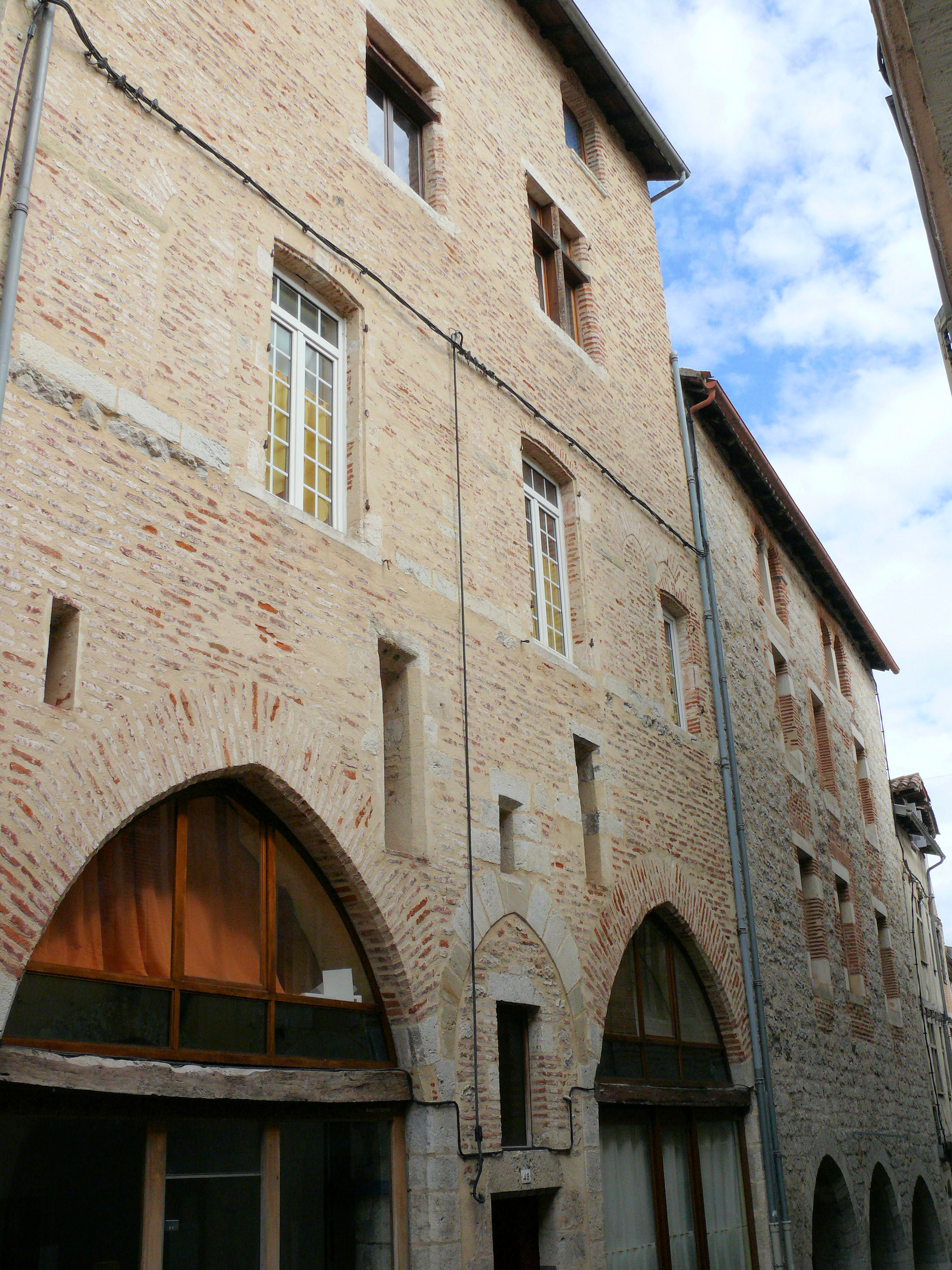
13th-century house of the Béral family at 43, rue du Château-du-Roi in Cahors

Cahors lies on the land road between Montpellier on the Mediterranean Sea and La Rochelle on the Atlantic Ocean, and the emergence of the Cahorsins as a significant trading community has been related to the emergence of these two new port cities in the 11th and early 12th centuries. Despite major lapses in documentation, evidence for the long-distance merchant activity of Cahorsins goes back to the late 12th century, with their attested presence in Marseille and Saint-Gilles in 1178 and in La Rochelle in 1194. Using the Lot and Garonne rivers, Cahorsins exported their local wine to England and imported wool from there, but transported more valuable goods and spices imported from the Levant to La Rochelle by road. Their presence at the Champagne fairs is documented from 1216, and in Flanders from 1230. In 1240, Henry III exiled from England some Cahorsins, mainly of Sens, for usury with extortion.

By the middle of the 13th century, Cahors played a larger rôle in long-distance trade than most other cities of southwestern France, including Toulouse. In the third quarter of the 13th century, the Cahorsins were major financial system participants in London and England, on a par with Northern Italian merchants and some of them took over the former properties of English Jews following the Edict of Expulsion in 1290.

The causes of the Cahorsins' decline in the late 13th and early 14th centuries have not been identified with certainty. They may have been related with the 1294–1303 Gascon War which put an end to their prior balancing act as subjects of the King of France in and around Cahors, but active in English lands in Aquitaine and Great Britain. That period also saw the decline of the Champagne fairs.

The legacy of Cahorsin opulence has been related to the rise of Jacques Duèse from Cahors up to his election in 1316 as Pope John XXII. Duèse's father had probably been a merchant and moneychanger.

== Reputation and historiography ==
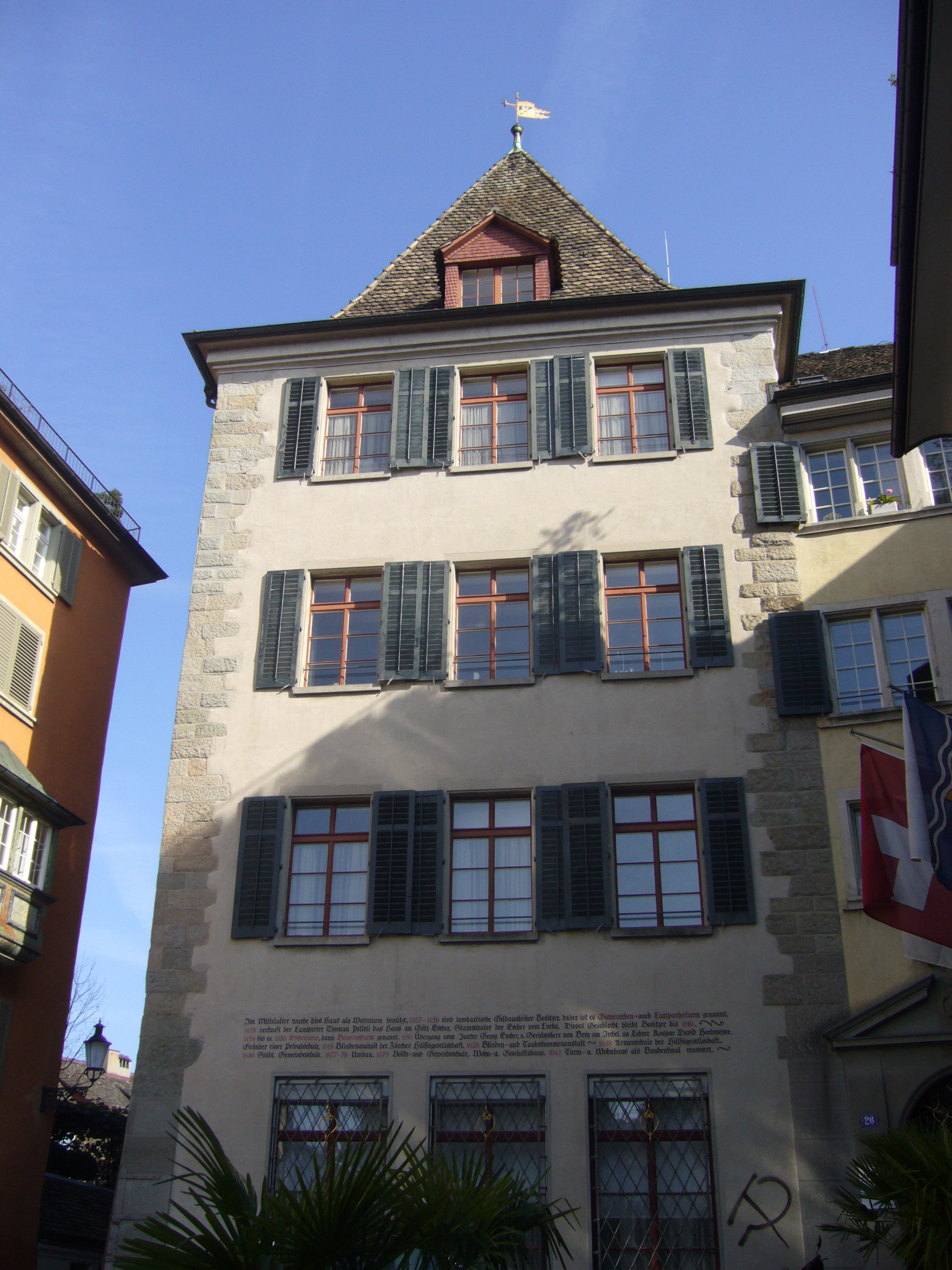
The Brunnenturm in Zürich, also known as Kawertschenturm (lit. 'Cahorsins' Tower') for its use by moneylenders in the late 14th and early 15th centuries

The Cahorsins' name was often used to refer to Christian (i.e. non-Jewish) usurers, together with that of Lombards, both during the 13th century and in the later period following their decline. Their usury activity was prohibited by rulers such as Henry III, Duke of Brabant in 1261 and successive kings of France, Louis IX in 1269 and Philip III in 1274.

Dante Alighieri referred to Cahors and Cahorsins twice in the Divine Comedy, in part out of his aversion for contemporary Pope John XXII. In Canto XI of Inferno, he paired Cahors with Sodom (Soddoma e Caorsa) as sinful places, respectively associated with sodomy and usury; and in Canto XXVII of Paradiso, he portrayed Saint Peter referring to Cahorsins and Gascons (Caorsini e Guaschi) in an allusion to the rapacity of John XXII and of his predecessor Clement V, who was from Villandraut in Gascony. Giovanni Boccaccio later echoed Dante's disparaging references to Cahorsins in commentary of his own.

References to usurers as Cahorsins were widespread in late medieval Germany, where their name was spelled Kawertschen. As late as the mid-17th century, they were still lambasted as "worse than Jews" by a legal scholar in Bordeaux, echoing similarly stereotypical language formulated in the mid-1230s by Matthew Paris.

A stream of early French historiography, initiated in the 17th century by Du Cange and partly perpetuated in the 19th century by Maurice Prou among others, has portrayed the medieval Cahorsins as Italian merchants from Tuscany and/or Piedmont. This was, however, disproved in studies by Edmond Albe and Philippe Wolff in the second quarter of the 20th century. Yves Renouard contributed further research on the Cahorsins in the early 1960s.

== Notable Cahorsins ==
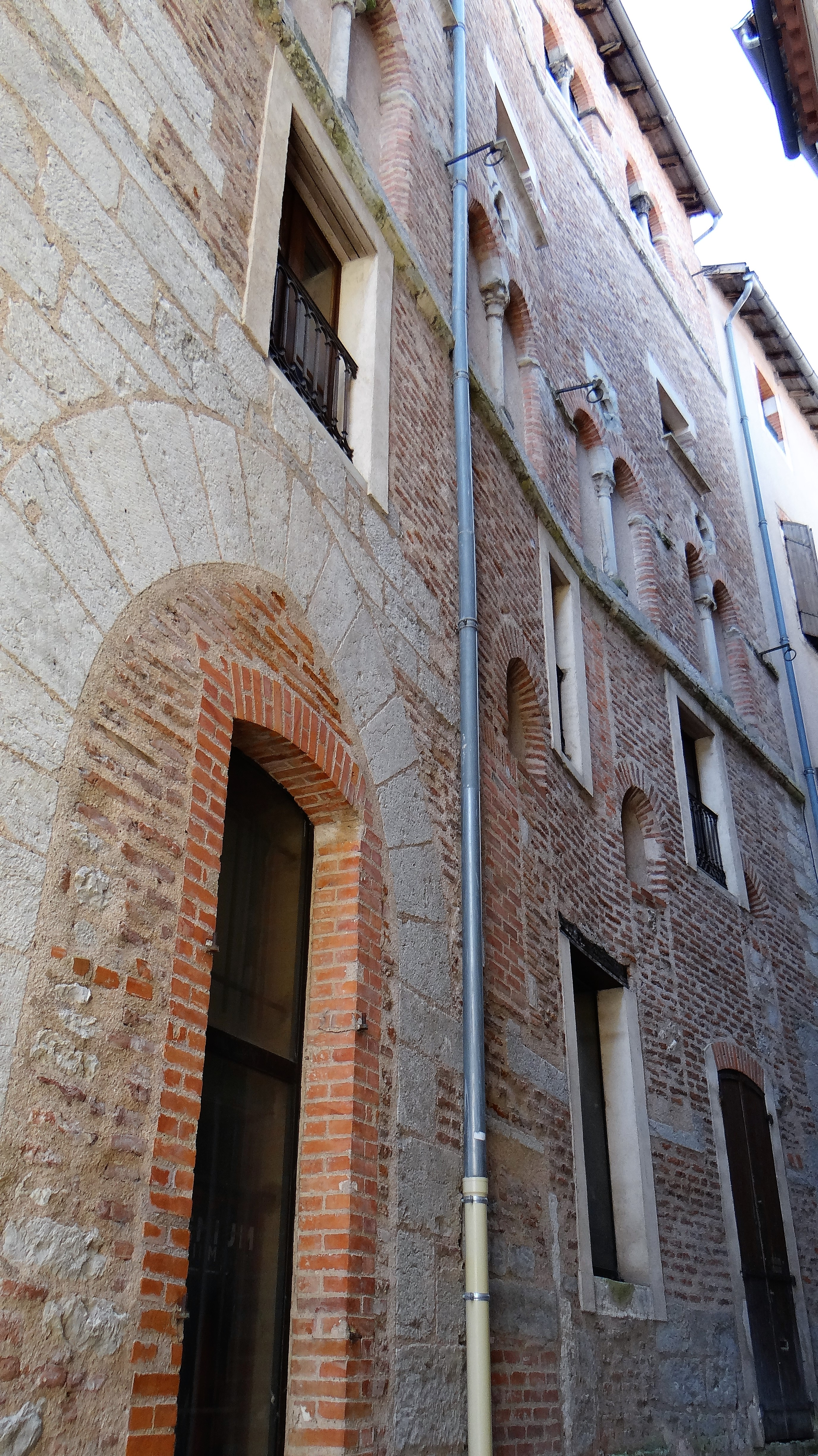
13th-century house of the De Jean family at 112, rue Saint-André in Cahors

- Bernard de Montcuq was chamberlain of the Count of Champagne in the early 13th century and three times elected mayor of Troyes.
- Raymond and Elie de Salvagnac, from Cahors and established in Montpellier, lent money to Simon de Montfort for the Albigensian Crusade around 1210 and, in lieu of reimbursement, were granted the lordships of Pézenas and Tourves as well as the spoils from the storming of Lavaur in 1211, as related by chronicler William of Tudela; by the late 13th century, Raymond's sons were established as prominent clerics in Paris.
- The Conques family, initially based in Figeac, became prominent in the Mediterranean ports and the Levant in the early 13th century; Raymond de Conques was consul of Montpellier in Acre in 1236, Bernard de Conques was a wealthy citizen of Marseille, and Hugues de Conques was a prominent follower of Charles I of Anjou who ennobled him and granted him lands in Southern Italy.
- Savary de Cahors became mayor of La Rochelle in 1251.
- The brothers Pierre and Guilhem Béraud held the largest wool export license granted by the Kings of England in the early 1270s, and acted as tax farmers and lenders to the English monarchy. Their relative Arnaud Béraud endowed the Dominican convent in Cahors, across the Lot river from the old city.
- Guiral Trapas, from Castelnau-Montratier, in 1283 wrote a will that illustrates the reach of Cahorsin networks, naming beneficiaries in London, Gloucester, Southampton, Canterbury, Salisbury, Stamford in England and Burgos, Palencia, Toledo and Santander in Castile.
- Jacques de Jean, from Cahors and established in Bordeaux, was a significant lender to Edward I of England in the late 13th century. In 1316, Gauscelin de Jean became cardinal under pope John XXII.
- Guilhem Servat worked for Edward I of England and became burgher of London in 1286, alderman of Walbrook in 1309, member of Parliament in 1313, and one of London's richest and most powerful individuals until his death in 1320; in 1290, he traveled to Norway to negotiate the financial arrangements for the marriage of Margaret, Maid of Norway with Prince Edward of Caernarfon, the future Edward II.
- Bernard de Favas, from Gourdon, established himself in Marseille in 1302 and developed a trading network that extended into the Levant.
- Guy de Cahors led the minting of gold coinage for Philip V of France around 1320.
- Guillaume Bonnes Mains, from Figeac, financed and led an embassy to Al-Nasir Muhammad in Alexandria in 1327-1328, to help Eastern Christians on behalf of Charles IV of France.

== See also ==
- Gran Tavola
- Lombard banking
- Economic antisemitism
- Merchant capitalism
