= Eremo delle Carceri =

Catholic sanctuary in Italy

Coordinates: 43°03′49″N 12°39′06″E

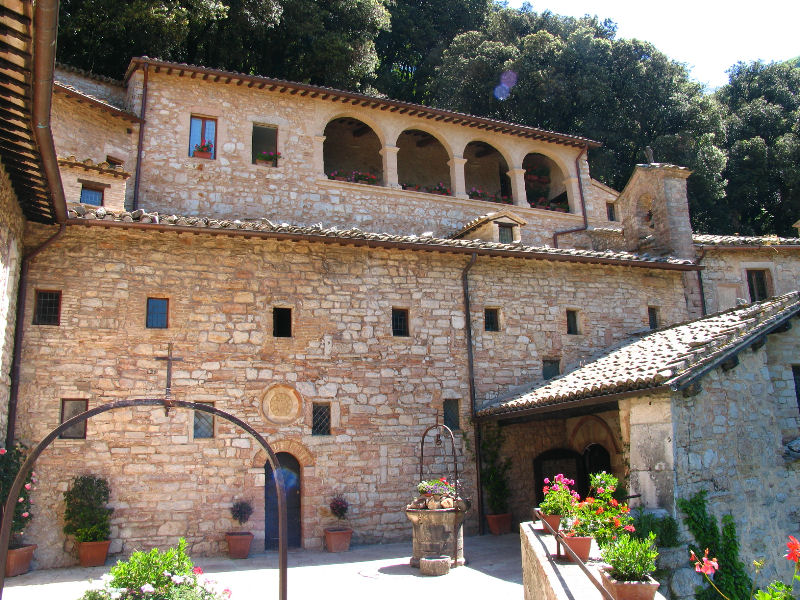
Eremo delle Carceri.

The Eremo delle Carceri ("Sanctuary of Eremo delle Carceri") is a hermitage complex located 791 metres (2,595 ft) above sea level in a steep forest gorge upon Monte Subasio, in Umbria, in central Italy, four kilometers above Assisi.

== History ==
The name Carceri derives from the Latin carceres, meaning "isolated places" or "prisons". The steps and bows of the gorge arch over a quatrefoil-shaped hole in the smooth pink stone, a natural grotto (the so-called "Hole of the Devil").

In the 13th century, Saint Francis of Assisi would often come to this place to pray and contemplate, as did other hermits before him. When he first came in 1205, the only building here was a tiny 12th-century oratory. Soon, other men followed him to the mountain, finding their own isolated caves nearby in which to pray. The oratory became known as Santa Maria delle Carceri after the small "prisons" occupied by friars in the area.

The site and the oratory was probably given by the Benedictines to St. Francis in 1215, at the same time they gave him the Porziuncola in the valley below. Francis dedicated himself to a life of preaching and missions, but throughout his life he would frequently withdraw to the Carceri to pray.

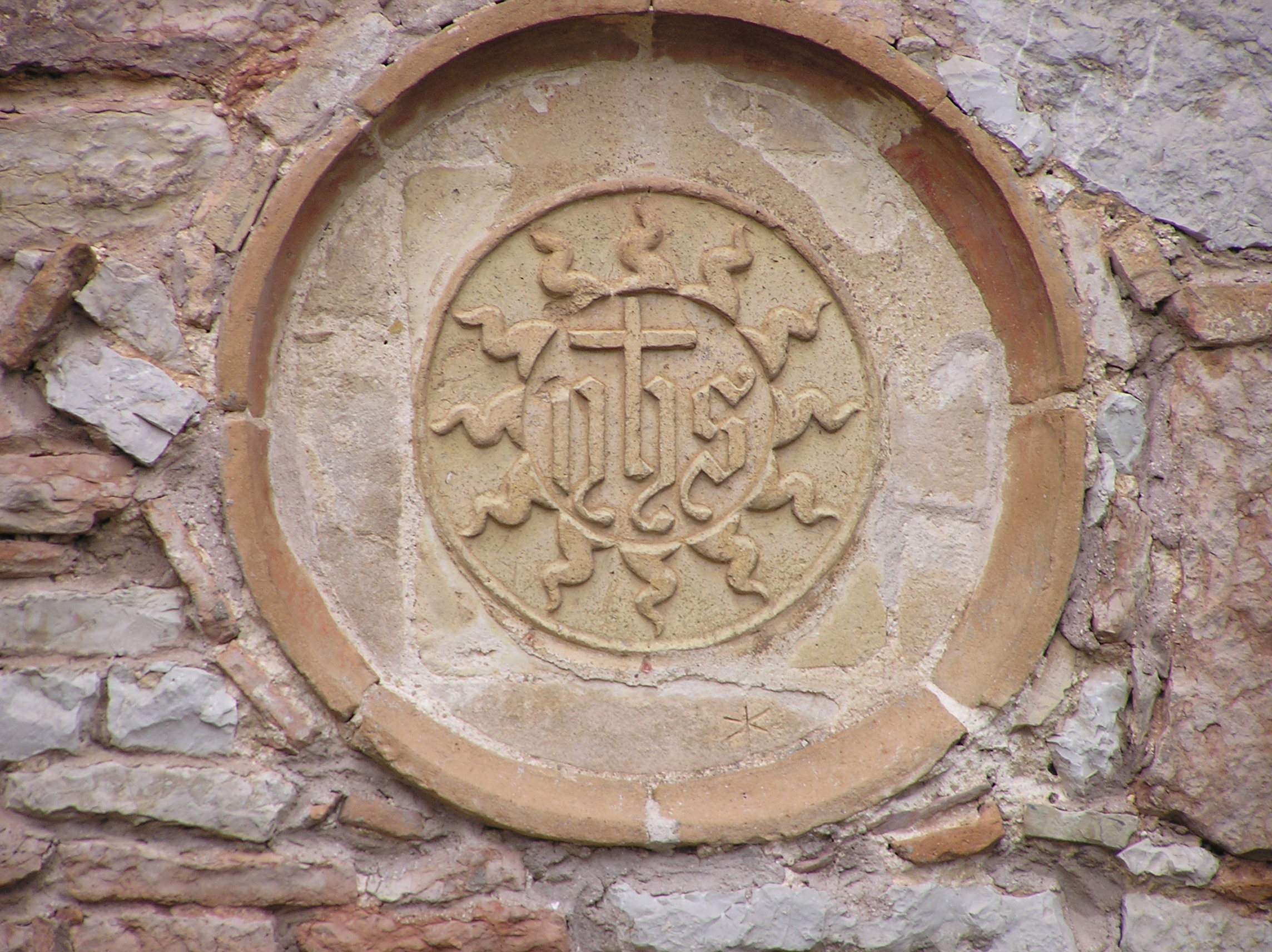
Seal of Saint Bernardino of Siena at the outer wall.

Around 1400, Saint Bernardino of Siena built a small friary, which includes a little choir and a simple refectory. The original wooden stalls of the choir and the tables of the refectory, which date from the 15th century, can still be seen on site. St. Bernardino also extended the earlier chapel by building a small church, which was also named Santa Maria delle Carceri. It contains a notable altarpiece fresco of the Virgin and Child.

In the centuries that followed, various buildings were added around St. Francis' cave and the original oratory, forming the sizable complex that exists today. Today some Franciscan friars live there and visitors are welcome.

Near the hermitage is a stone bridge and an ancient oak. According to legend, it was here that Saint Francis preached to the birds as they perched in the oak's branches.

== Buildings ==
A variety of buildings were added around the cave and the original oratory, creating a large complex.

- ‘‘‘Entrance’’’ – From the gate and short tunnel leads into a courtyard and a well, said to have yielded water after a prayer of St. Francis. The door marked Santuario leads into the 15th-century oratory built by St. Bernardine of Siena.
- St. Bernardine also built a small friary, which includes a little choir with wood stalls of c.1400 and a simple refectory with the original tables from c.1400. These two interesting areas can only be visited if accompanied by a friar of the community.
- (12th-century) and more rustic Cappella della Madonna, with an altarpiece fresco of the Virgin and Child.
- The Grotto of St. Francis, where the saint prayed and slept on a stone bed while on retreat toward the end of his life.
- Devils Hole, through another doorway and rounding a corner, visitors emerge into a small porch. Just outside the door, look down for a quatrefoil-shaped hole in the smooth pink stone. into which St. Francis is said to have tossed a troublesome demon who tempted Brother Rufino.
