= Bardi (surname) =

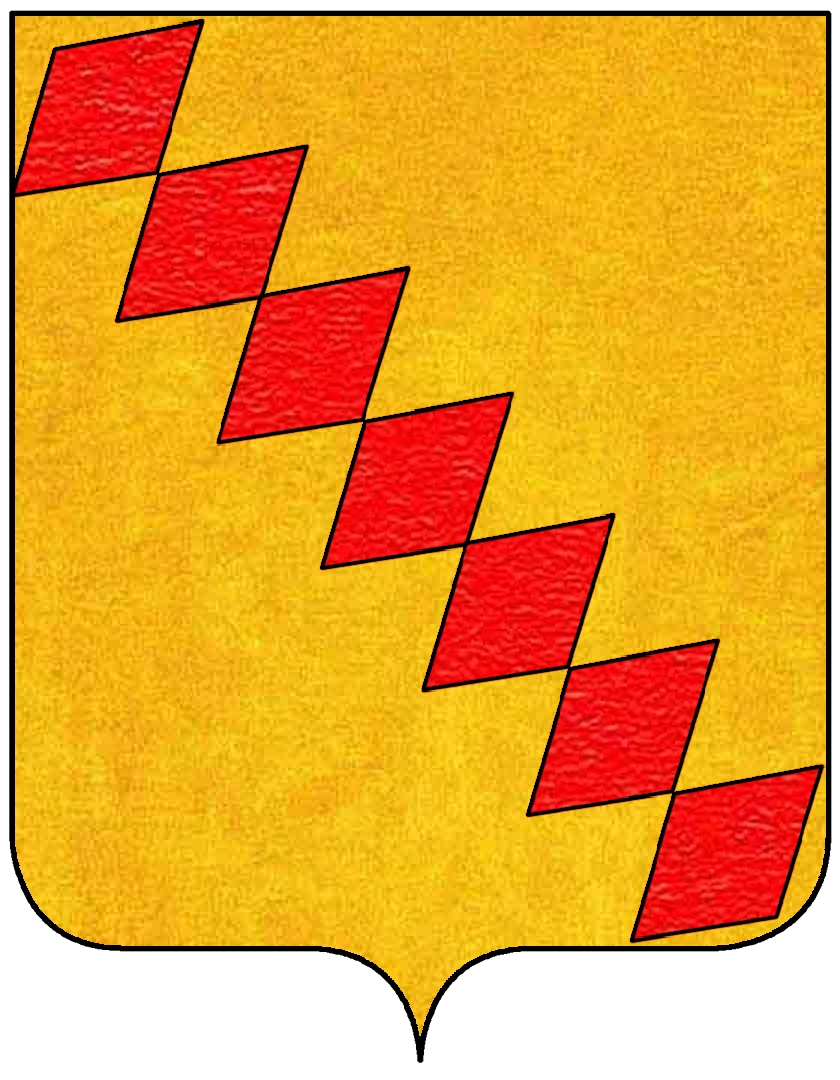
The coat of arms of the Bardi family

Bardi is an Italian surname. In the late Middle Ages, there were two noble families with this name. One, the Bardi family, was in Florence. A family that grew to have many branches, their name had originated as a patronymic derived from the name Berardo. The other family originated in Lombardy, and took the name as a toponymic after leaving the region.

== Origin ==
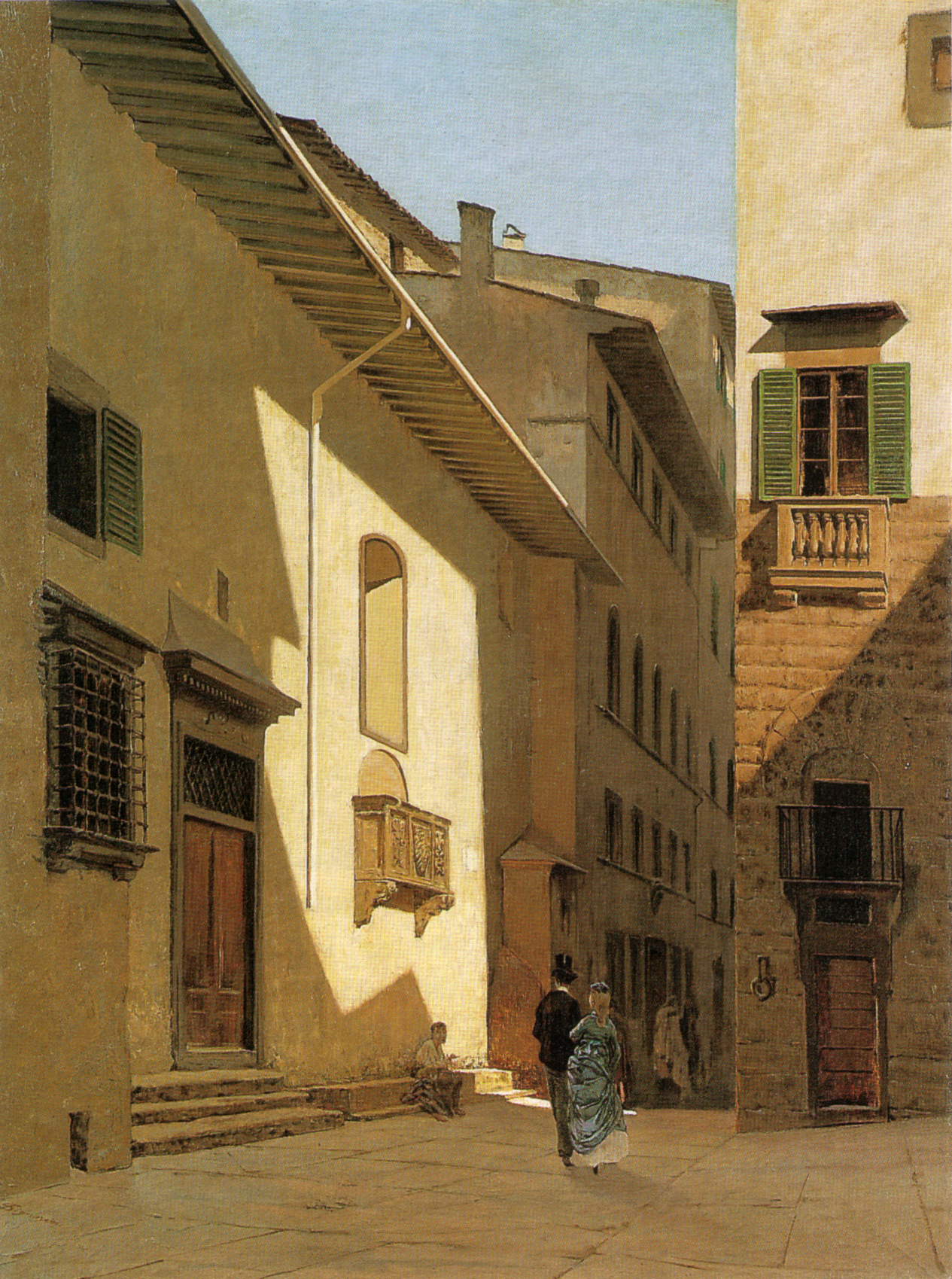
Telemaco Signorini's painting Santa Maria dei Bardi in Florence, depicting the namesake church in Via de' Bardi

The Bardi name of the Bardi family originated as a patronymic. The first record of the name was with Pagano di Bardo, who made a donation to a Florentine church in 1112. In his name, di Bardo refers to the given name Berardo, a Germanic name that was one of many common in northern Italy in the Middle Ages. Bardo's family was from Antalla (in the wider Florence area), where they had owned the castle Ruballa, and was present in the commune of Florence from the 11th century, owning much of the neighbourhood of Pidiglioso; this area was later renamed Via de' Bardi after them. The surname had become inherited as Bardi by the end of the 12th century, when the family was granted the hereditary title "count of Vernio".

Various Tuscan family names that were adopted in the Middle Ages end with –i. According to Joseph G. Fucilla in Our Italian Surnames, the process of adopting a patronymic as a single family name "went one step further" in central and northern Italy (including Tuscany) in the Middle Ages, compared to elsewhere in Italy. When a family gained power within their local area, a collective surname would often be used to refer to every member, altering the ending to the plural –i.

Agostino Ademollo accounted in his history of Florence that at some point, some members of the Florentine family claimed that their name was a toponymic variation of Lombardy and that they came from Lombardy to Florence via Genoa. Ademollo said this attribution was false, and that the Florentines only claimed so because the (different) de' Bardi family in Genoa were nobility.

For instances of the surname without traceable history, Michele Francipane theorised that the name Bardi could originate as a similar patronymic (including possibly via nicknames) or toponymic, or be an approximation of a similar word from another language, like the Celtic bardd (bard).

== History ==
The Bardi name was established by 1164, when the Holy Roman Emperor, Frederick Barbarossa, awarded the now-commune Vernio to Alberto Bardi, along with the hereditary title count, making this line European nobility. In the 1290s, the Bardi established banks in England, and they were one of the main European banking families by the 1320s.

Ademollo asserted that "there is no family in Florence that had as many branches as the Bardi". By the mid-14th century, there were many Bardi in Florence, with Florence historian John M. Najemy saying most of them by this point would not be involved with the operations of the bank. Surnames were still not common in Florence at the time, with a relatively small percentage of the population using them in 1345; Bardi was one of the most common by a significant margin. Sculptor Donatello's (b. 1386) surname was Bardi, but any relation to the bankers would have been distant. In 1427, when surnames were becoming more common, there were 45 Bardi homes south of the Arno (and 15 elsewhere in Florence); Carlo M. Cipolla wrote that remaining localised in one area suggested there was family cohesion between the branches.

Painter Donato de' Bardi was born to a noble family in Pavia, a commune in Lombardy. During political upheaval in the region, he left for Genoa, where he was recorded in 1426. He was known as Donato conte de' Bardi.

In the 21st century, the name is most common in Tuscany and Umbria.

== Notable people ==
=== Bardi family ===
- Contessina de' Bardi (1390–1473), wife of Cosimo de' Medici
- Giovanni de' Bardi (1534–1612), count of Vernio
- Robert de Bardis (fl. 1336), Chancellor of the University of Paris; known as Roberto in Italy, he was the nephew of Geri di Ricco de' Bardi (exiled after the Battle of Montaperti)

=== Others ===
- Danio Bardi (1937–1991), Italian water polo player
- Donatello (1386–1466), Italian Renaissance sculptor
- Donato de' Bardi (died c. 1451), Italian Quattrocento painter
- Francesco Bardi (born 1992), Italian footballer
- Lina Bo Bardi (1914–1992), Italian-Brazilian architect
- Mario Bardi (1922–1998), Italian painter
- Pietro Maria Bardi (1900–1999), Italian curator
- Ugo Bardi (born 1952), Italian professor
- Vito Bardi (born 1951), Italian general and politician

There were also unconfirmed reports that Uberto Lanfranchi (died 1137), Archbishop of Pisa, was the son of a Bardo.

== See also ==
- Bardo (surname)
- Bardis (surname)
- Bardi (disambiguation)
