= Avignon Exchange =

14th-century foreign exchange market

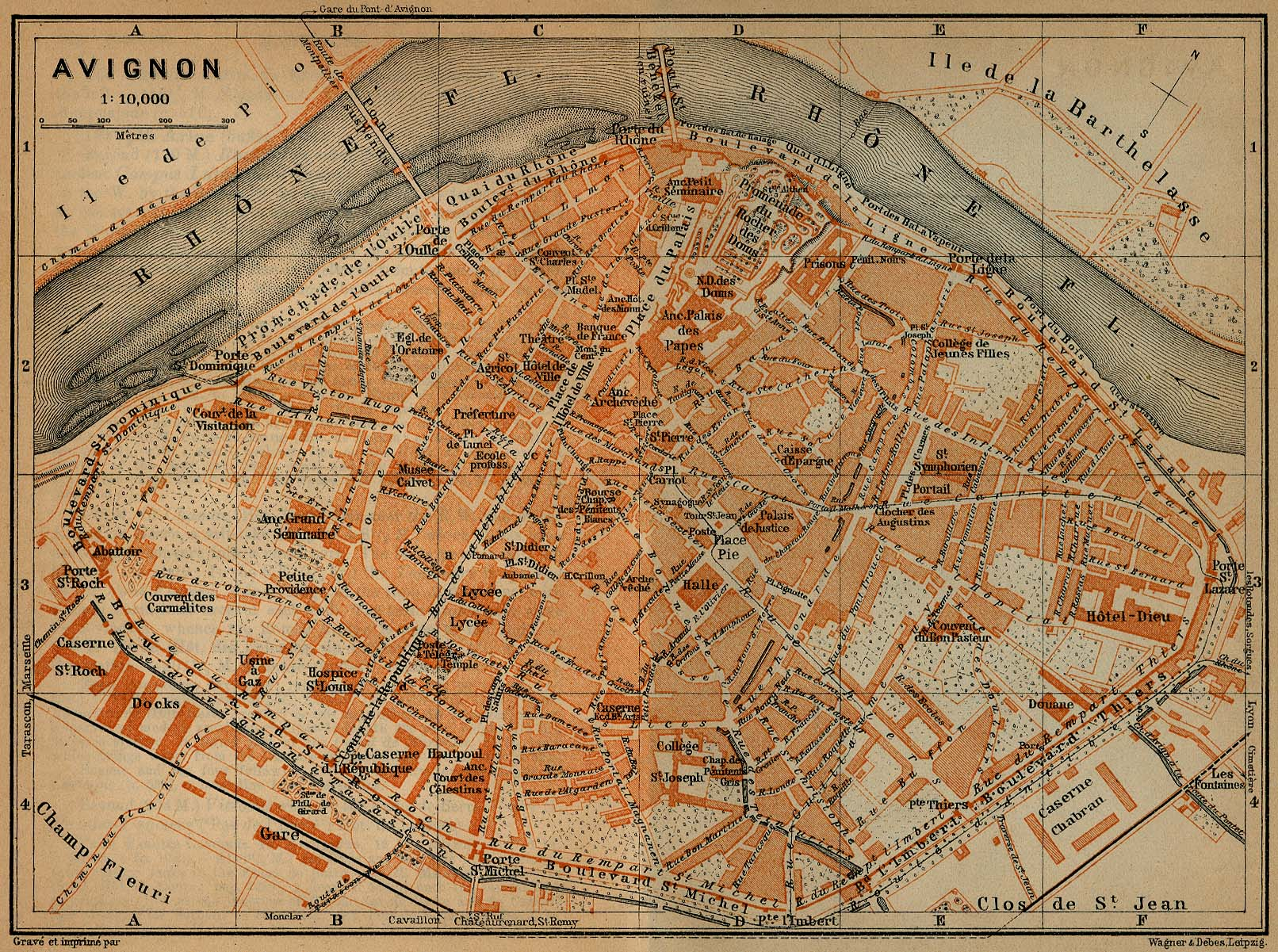
A map of the old city of Avignon (1914); the Exchange was located in what is now the Rue de la République running from the center of the city to the southwest.

The Avignon Exchange was one of the first foreign exchange markets in history, established in the Comtat Venaissin during the Avignon Papacy. The Exchange was composed of the agents (factores) of the great Italian banking-houses, who acted as money-changers as well as financial intermediaries between the Apostolic Camera and its debtors and creditors. The most prosperous quarter of the city of Avignon, where the bankers settled, became known simply as the Exchange. According to de Roover, "Avignon can be considered an Italian colony, since the papal bankers were all Italians".

Avignon was the first legal body to regulate fiduciary transactions: a statute of Avignon, of 1243, contains a paragraph entitled De Litteris Cambii, "of bills of exchange".

== Background ==
Unlike most medieval rulers who levied funds from sources of taxation relatively nearby, the papacy's primary source of income was constituted from taxes and tributes collected across Europe. Moreover, the papacy had a gross geographic mismatch of its assets and liabilities: money collected in France and Poland, for example, might be spent for military reconquest in the Papal States. The papacy soon discovered that the direct transfer or shipment of physical specie over long distances was not only risky but extremely expensive, and was thus forced to procure the services of international merchant-bankers who dealt in foreign exchange from their branches throughout the important commercial centers of Western Europe not only in large centers but at the sites of the Champagne fairs.

However, the Italian merchant-bankers could be of no assistance for funds collected in Eastern Europe (mainly Poland, Hungary, and Bohemia), Scandinavia, and Northern Germany where there was no organized money market at this time, and thus the direct transfer of funds was still required. The preferred alternative to shipping specie was to entrust small amounts to ecclesiastics who happened to be traveling to visit the pope or (more often) traveling merchants on their way to Bruges or Venice (however, to transfer funds from Kraków to Bruges to Avignon took over a year). Even in Western Europe, direct transfer of funds was required when the foreign exchange market could not provide the necessary liquidity; for example, in 1327, 100,000 florins were sent from Avignon to Bologna in a caravan of fifteen pack animals guarded by an armed escort of forty-six.

The Apostolic Camera, or papal treasury, was established in the 13th century, with close ties to Italian merchant bankers, who were given the title mercatores camerae apostolicae ("mercatores" of the Apostolic Camera). The papal residences of Rome, Viterbo, and Rieti were close to the two main banking centers in Italy: Florence and Siena; however, these connections were severed during the reign of Pope Clement V (1305–1315) as he wandered through Languedoc and Provence.

Only when Pope John XXII (1316–1334) began the construction of a permanent papal residence in Avignon, the Palais des Papes, did the major Italian banks open branches in the Curia and resume their dealings with the Camera. However, the closeness of this relationship never equaled the "intimate" management of the Gran Tavola of Orlando Bonsignori in the 13th century; instead of entrusting idle funds to merchant bankers for investment, the papal Chamberlain, Treasurer, and Vice-treasurer (all high-ranking ecclesiastics, assisted by a "throng" of clerics, notaries, and laymen) managed these funds more physically, keeping them in a "strong room" built specifically for this purpose.

=== Theology of usury ===
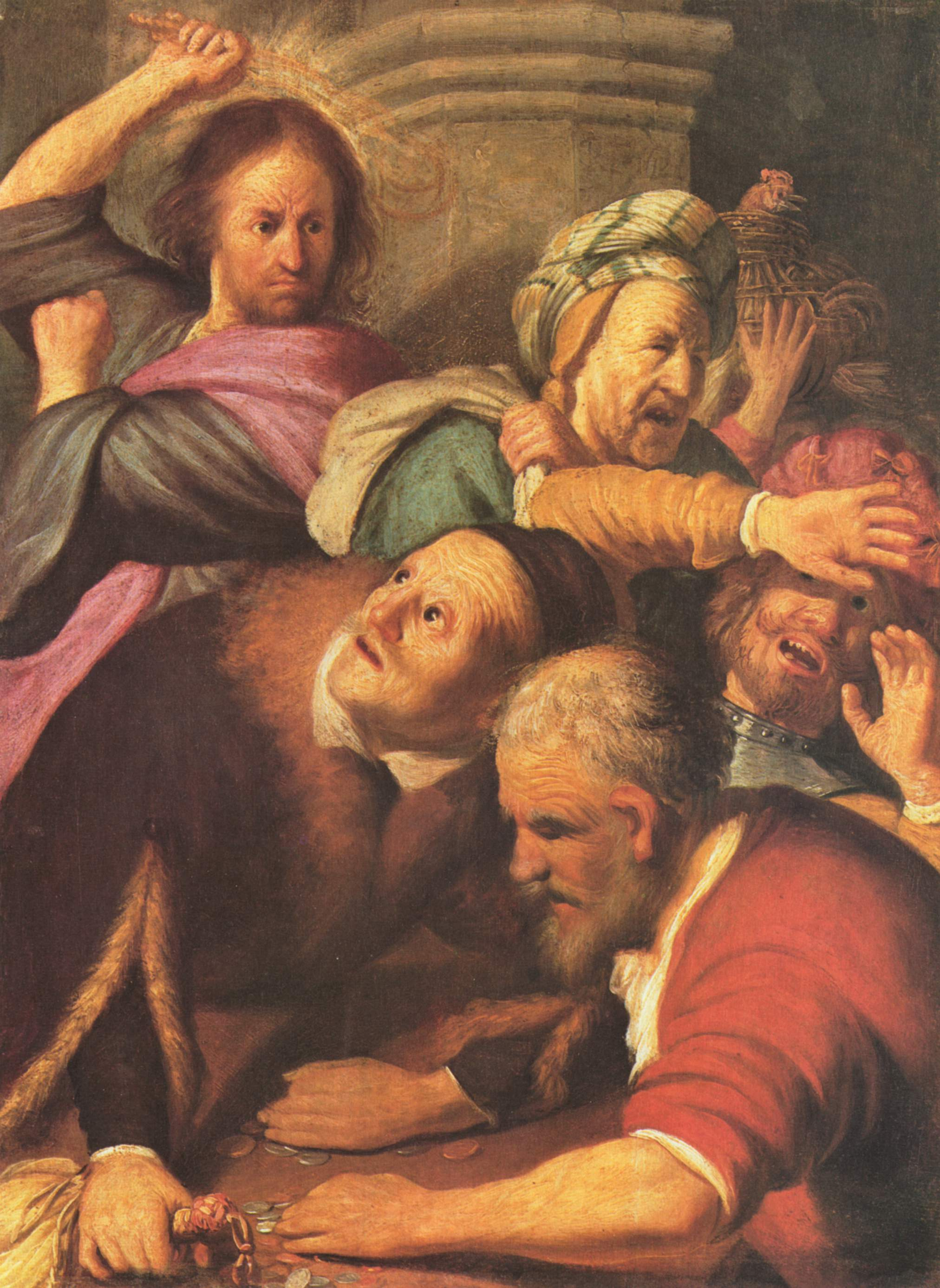
The Avignon Exchange was created in a theological environment more permissive of money-changing than Biblical accounts of Jesus.

Although scholastic economic philosophers had constructed a wide variety of prohibitions and loopholes related to the conduct of traditional lending (usury), there is very little scholastic thought on foreign exchange transactions except insofar as they related to the covering of loan repayment. Raymond de Roover notes that:

"One paradoxical result of this controversy was that pawnbrokers and small money-lenders were the main victims of the campaigns waged against usury by friars like Bernardino of Feltre, but the big bankers and international connections were left undisturbed. Far from being censured they were called "the peculiarly beloved sons of the Church" and prided themselves in being the Pope's exchangers. In fact, their services were indispensable for the transfer of papal funds."

Thus, "Profit and Loss on Exchange" (Pro e danno di cambio) was not considered usury and was frequently listed in accounting books.

== History ==
From 1316 to 1342, the Avignon popes relied on the exchange services of three large Florentine banking houses—the Bardi, Peruzzi, and Acciaioli—all of whom failed in 1342, bringing down the entire papal transfer system with them.

From 1342 to 1362, the Apostolic Camera was required to use the services of several smaller and weaker firms from Asti (especially Malabayla), Lucca, and Pistoia; the Camera was unsuccessful in trying to build up the capacity of each of these bankers.

However, in 1362, the papacy was able to employ the services of the Alberti antichi banking house in Florence, which had recently risen to prominence. The papacy did not use the mechanism of the bill of exchange (which had been common since the 13th century), but rather employed a unique procedure, which required a receipt in notarial form for all transfers to Avignon, called the instrumentum cambii; this instrument—always made out in duplicate or triplicate—specified the amount received by the banker and proxy and recorded a promise to transmit to Avignon and pay to the pope or his agent a certain amount. One copy of the instrument was sent to Avignon by the papal carrier which enabled the Avignon administration to obtain payment from either the banker or their Avignon representative. The use of written documents was considered "not businesslike" by contemporaries as it required the constant "intervention of notaries".

The instrumentum cambii (also known as an "Avisa") did not eliminate the possibility of fraud, but rather created different possibilities for misdealings, as seen with a 1359 exchange between Venice and Avignon.

The Avignon branch of the Medici bank was not established until 1446, the same year as the London branch.
