= Pratica della mercatura =

International trade guide for the 14th-century

The Practica della mercatura (Italian for "The Practice of Commerce"), also known as the Merchant's Handbook, is a comprehensive guide to international trade in 14th-century Eurasia and North Africa as known to its compiler, the Florentine banker Francesco Balducci Pegolotti. It was written sometime between 1335 and 1343, the most likely dates being 1339 or 1340. Its original title was the Book of Descriptions of Lands (Libro di divisamenti di paesi); (Note: Fully, The Book of Descriptions of Countries and of Measures Employed in Business and of Other Things Needful to Be Known by Merchants (Libro di divisamenti di paesi e di misuri di mercatanzie e daltre cose bisognevoli di sapere a mercatanti)) its more common name is that from its first printing in 1766. Pegolotti's work is based on his own experience as a banker and merchant for the Bardi, and on various local documents, statutes and price lists available to him.

== History ==
No autograph survives. The sole surviving manuscript, used by all the printed editions, is that in the Biblioteca Riccardiana at Florence. It states that it was copied on 19 March 1472 by Filippo di Niccolaio Frescobaldi from a copy held by Agnolo di Lotti of Anella, who claimed it had been made from Pegolotti's original.

Pegolotti seems to have had access to an earlier, much more limited, compilation made at Pisa in 1279, now preserved in the Biblioteca Comunale at Siena, entitled Memoria de Tucte le Mercantie. (Note: Fully, Memoria de tucte le mercantie come carican le navi in Alexandria e li pesi come tornano duna terra addunaltra.)

Pegolotti's work was probably used by the compiler of the Venetian trade manual Tarifa zoè noticia dy pexi e mexure di luogi e tere che s'adovra marcadantia per el mondo in the 1340s. It then served as a source for a later work which shares its title, the Pratica della mercatura compiled by Giovanni di Bernardo da Uzzano in 1442. Soon afterwards it was drawn on by the author of Libro che tracta di mercatantie et usanze de' paesi, compiled in 1458 probably by Giorgio Chiarini, afterwards incorporated in Luca Pacioli's Summa de arithmetica.

== Contents ==
=== Glossary ===
Glossary of terms then in use for all kinds of taxes or payments on merchandise as well as for every kind of place where goods might be bought or sold in cities (Evans, pp. 14–19). Languages listed as necessary include

  - Arabic ("Saracen", "Barbary")
  - Armenian
  - English
  - West Flemish and Brabantian (both Dutch dialects)
  - French (and the French of Outremer: "Cypriot", "Syrian")
  - Friulian
  - Genoese
  - Greek (and "Trapezuntine")
  - Persian
  - Provençal
  - Sardinian
  - Sicilian and Apulian
  - Spanish
  - "Tartar"
  - Tuscan
  - Venetian

=== Routes and cities ===
Listing of the principal routes and trading cities frequented by Italian merchants; the imports and exports of various important commercial regions; the business customs prevalent in each of those regions; and the comparative value of the leading moneys, weights and measures.

- Includes the following routes and surveys:
  - The journey to Gattaio (Evans, pp. 21–23), from Azov via Astrakhan, Khiva, Otrar and Kulja to Beijing (in the text these names appear as Tana, Gittarchan, Organci, Ottrarre, Armalecco, Canbalecco). The merchant is advised that he will be considered more respectable if he takes a woman with him on this journey, but she must be fluent in the Cuman language.
  - Coast of the Mare Maggiore
  - Stages from Ayas via Sivas, Erzingan and Erzerum to Tabriz in Persia (in the text these names appear as Laiazo, Salvastro, Arzinga, Arzerone, Torissi)
  - England and Scotland as sources of wool, listing many monasteries including Newbattle, Balmerino, Cupar, Dunfermline, Dundrennan, Glenluce, Coldingham, Kelso, Newminster near Morpeth, Furness, Fountains, Kirkstall, Kirstead, Swineshead, Sawley and Calder.
- Includes main headings for the following trading places. Many others are listed incidentally. Under each heading there are lists of the main commodities with details of weights and measures, laws and customs of trade, pricing, customs duties. Pegolotti adds tables of comparison of each city's weights and measures with those of others to facilitate calculations.
  - Tana nel Mare Maggiore
  - Caffa
  - Torisi di Persia
  - Trabisonda
  - Gostantinopoli e Pera
  - Altoluogo di Turchia (Ayasoluk)
  - Setalia di Turchia
  - Erminia, chiefly Laiazo d'Erminia. Merchants of the Compagnia dei Bardi were exempt from customs duties at Ayas
  - Acri di Soria
  - Allessandria
  - Damietta
  - Cipri, chiefly Famagosta di Cipri. Pegolotti notes that he has negotiated a reduction of customs duties for the Compagnia dei Bardi and for those identified as Florentine merchants by the Bardi representative at Famagusta
  - Rodi
  - Candia di Creti
  - Cicilia, including Messina, Palermo
  - Chiarenza
  - Stiva (Ištip)
  - Nigroponte
  - Sardigna, chiefly Castello di Castro
  - Maiolica
  - Tunisi di Barberia
  - Tripoli di Barberia
  - Gierbi di Barberia
  - Vinegia
  - Frioli
  - Ancona
  - Puglia, chefly Barletta. Includes the fairs of Ascoli, Bitonto, Manfredonia, Brandizio, Taranto, Corneto di Puglia (now a destroyed city), Bari, Trani, San Giovanni Ritondo, Foggia, Salerno, Giovanazo, Noccia di Saraccino and Potenza
  - Cutrone di Calavria
  - Salerno
  - Napoli di Principato
  - Gaeta
  - Firenze
  - Pisa
  - Gienova
  - Nimissi e Monpolieri
  - Vignone
  - Aguamorta
  - Evizia
  - Borgogna
  - The fairs of Campagna (The fairs of Lagnino, Bari, Proino and Tresetto)
  - Parigi
  - Fiandra, chiefly Bruggia but also Guanto, Ipro, Lilla and Doagio
  - Bruggia di Fiandra
  - Brabante, chiefly Anguersa but also Mellino, Borsella and Lovano
  - Anguersa. Pegolotti notes that he has negotiated equality for Florentine merchants at Antwerp with those from Germany, England and Genoa
  - Londra d'Inghilterra
  - Roccella di Guascogna
  - Sobilia di Spagna
  - Reame di Morocco di Spagna, including Niffe, Salle and Arzilla

=== Lists and tables ===
- Lengths of cloth (Evans pp. 277–286)
- Fineness of gold and silver coin (Evans pp. 287–292)
- Spices and their packing (Evans pp. 293–300, 307–319)
- Compound interest tables (the first known tables of compound interest, Evans pp. 301–302)
- Valuation of pearls and precious stones
- Buying and selling grain
- Shipping
- Calendar tables
- Fineness of gold and silver (Evans pp. 331–360)
- Types and qualities of spices and other trade goods (Evans pp. 360–383)

== Editions ==
Pegolotti's Pratica della mercatura was first published by Gianfrancesco Pagnini as part of Della Decima, his multi-volume history of the finances of Florence, in 1766. Only short sections have appeared in French and English translation. The 1936 edition by Allan Evans is now standard: it includes important glossaries of commodities, place names, coins and money, etc., but no translation.

- Nicolaio di Frescobaldi, Filippo di, ed. (1471), Libro di Divisamenti di Paesi... [Book of Descriptions of Countries...], Florence. (in Italian)
- Pagnini del Ventura, Gian Francisco, ed. (1766), Della Decima di Varie Gravezze Imposte dal Comune di Firenze della Moneta e della Mercatura de' Fiorentini Fino al Secolo XVI [A Treatise on the Decima and the Various Other Burdens Imposed on the Community of Florence and on the Currency and Commerce of the Florentines up to the Sixteenth Century], Vol. III: Practica della Mercatura [The Practice of Commerce], Florence. (in Italian)
- Yule, Henry, ed. (1914), "Pegolotti's Notices of the Land Route to Cathay", Cathay and the Way Thither, Vol. III: Missionary Friars—Rashíduddín—Pegolotti—Marignolli, Second Series, No. XXXVII, London: Hakluyt Society, pp. 134–173.
- Evans, Allan, ed. (1936), La Pratica della Mercatura, Cambridge: Mediaeval Academy of America. (in Italian)
