= Bardis =

Bardis is a surname. Notable people with the surname include

- Giovanni Bardis (born 1987), French weightlifter
- John Bardis, Assistant Secretary of Administration (ASA) for the U.S. Department of Health & Human Services
- Mélanie Bardis (born 1986), French weightlifter
- Panos Bardis (1924–1996), Greek American sociologist
- Timis Bardis (born 1997), Greek professional footballer

== See also ==
- Bardi (surname)
- Robert de Bardis, 14th-century Chancellor of the University of Paris and a member of the Florentine Bardi banking family
- Bardi (People)
