= Bonsignori =

Bonsignori (or Buonsignori) was an Italian noble family whose notable members included:

- Orlando Bonsignori (d. 1273), banker
- Francesco Bonsignori (1455-1519), painter

== See also ==
- Gran Tavola, the Bonsignori bank
