= Bardi =

Bardi may refer to:

== Australian uses ==
- Bardi language, the language of the Bardi people
- Bardi people, an Indigenous Australian people, inhabiting parts of the Kimberley region of Western Australia
- Ardyaloon, Western Australia, also called One Arm Point or Bardi, a small community
- Bardi bush, an Australian plant, Acacia victoriae
- Bardi, the larva of the rain moth, Trictena atripalpis

== People ==
- Bardi (surname)
  - Mario Bardi (1922–1998), painter
  - Francesco Bardi (born 1992), footballer
  - Vito Bardi (born 1951), Italian general and politician
- Bardi family, influential Florentine family from the 12th to 15th centuries
  - Giovanni de' Bardi (1534–1612), literary critic, writer, composer, and soldier
- Barði Jóhannsson (born 1975), Icelandic singer
- Cardi B (born 1992), American rapper also known as Bardi

== Places ==
- Bardi, Emilia-Romagna, a city in the province of Parma, northern Italy
- Bardi, Iran, a village in Ilam Province, Iran

== See also ==
- Bardy (disambiguation)
