= Beraldo =

Beraldo is a surname. Notable people with the surname include:

- Eros Beraldo (1929–2004), Italian footballer and manager
- Giovanni Beraldo
- Lucas Beraldo, (born 2003), Brazilian footballer
- Paul Beraldo (born 1967), Canadian ice hockey player
- Wilson Teixeira Beraldo (1917–1998), Brazilian physician and physiologist

== See also ==
- Berardo
