= Bardy =

Bardy may refer to:

== Places ==
- Bardy, Poland
- Bardy-Świelubie (8th and 9th century), a Slavic-Scandinavian archaeological site in Pomerania

== People with the surname ==
- Bardy (surname)

== Businesses ==
- Bardy Diagnostics, a supplier of medical diagnosis equipment

== See also ==
- Bardi (disambiguation)
- Barty, surname and nickname
- Barty, Warmian-Masurian Voivodeship, village in Poland
