= Suppa (surname) =

Suppa (pron. súppa) is an Italian surname.

== Variants ==
Suppi, Suppo.

== Origins ==
This surname can be placed as suggested by Joseph G. Fucilla among the names that are derived from objects. In this case, the surname Suppa is derived from the Latin word "suppa" (soup), in turn from the Gothic "suppa", which means "a slice of bread soaked", or the regional term "zuffa" which means "polenta" or "corn", resulting in turn from the Lombardic "supfa", which means "broth".

The surname is mostly found in Calabria and a high concentration of inhabitants called Suppa are located in the Province of Vibo Valentia. Its origin would be more plausible from the Greek word σούπα (soup) due to Calabria's past within Magna Graecia and influence of Greek and particularly Achaean settlements but in Greek the word is a borrowing from the French word soupe.

== Celebrities ==
- Andrea Suppa, painter
- Bernardino Suppa, protopapas of the Cattolica dei Greci (1556-1590)
- Frank Suppa, soldier of the Lucchese crime family
- Luigi Suppa, O.P. † (1565 - 1569 deceased) Archbishop of the Archdiocese of Agrigento
- Maria Suppa, Italian artist
- Marika Suppa, Grande Fratello competitor
- Coletta Suppa, Mayor of Reggio Calabria in the fifteenth century
- Mario Suppa, Mayor of Reggio Calabria in the fifteenth century
- Michelle Suppa, Canadian actress
- Pasquale Suppa, Italian football coach and former footballer
- Pasqualino Suppa, Italian director
- Silvio Suppa, Italian writer
- Rosa Suppa, Italian political and civil lawyer.
- Pierre Suppa, French musician and a Star Academy competitor (7th season)
- Al Suppa, hockey player
