= Barte =

Barte is a surname. Notable people with the surname include:

- Eleanore Barté (1893–1946), American writer
- Hilary Barte (born 1988), American tennis player

== See also ==
- Miner's axe
- Bartee
- Barter (surname)
- Barthe (surname)
