= Berardinelli =

Berardinelli is an Italian cognominal surname. It derives from a diminutive of the Germanic personal name Berardo, formed with ber 'bear'. Notable people with the surname include:

- Cleonice Berardinelli (1916–2023), Brazilian Lusitanist
- Giuseppe Antonio Berardinelli (1922–2001), American boxer
- James Berardinelli (born 1967), American film critic

== See also ==
- Berardinelli–Seip congenital lipodystrophy
- Berardinetti
