= Bartee =

Bartee is a surname. Notable people with the surname include:

- Kimera Bartee (1972–2021), American baseball player and coach
- William Bartee (born 1977), American football player
- Lawrence Bartee (born 2004), American College Basketball Player and Philosopher

== See also ==
- Barte
- Barter (surname)
- Barty
