= Seneca effect =

Phenomenon where things grow slowly but decline rapidly

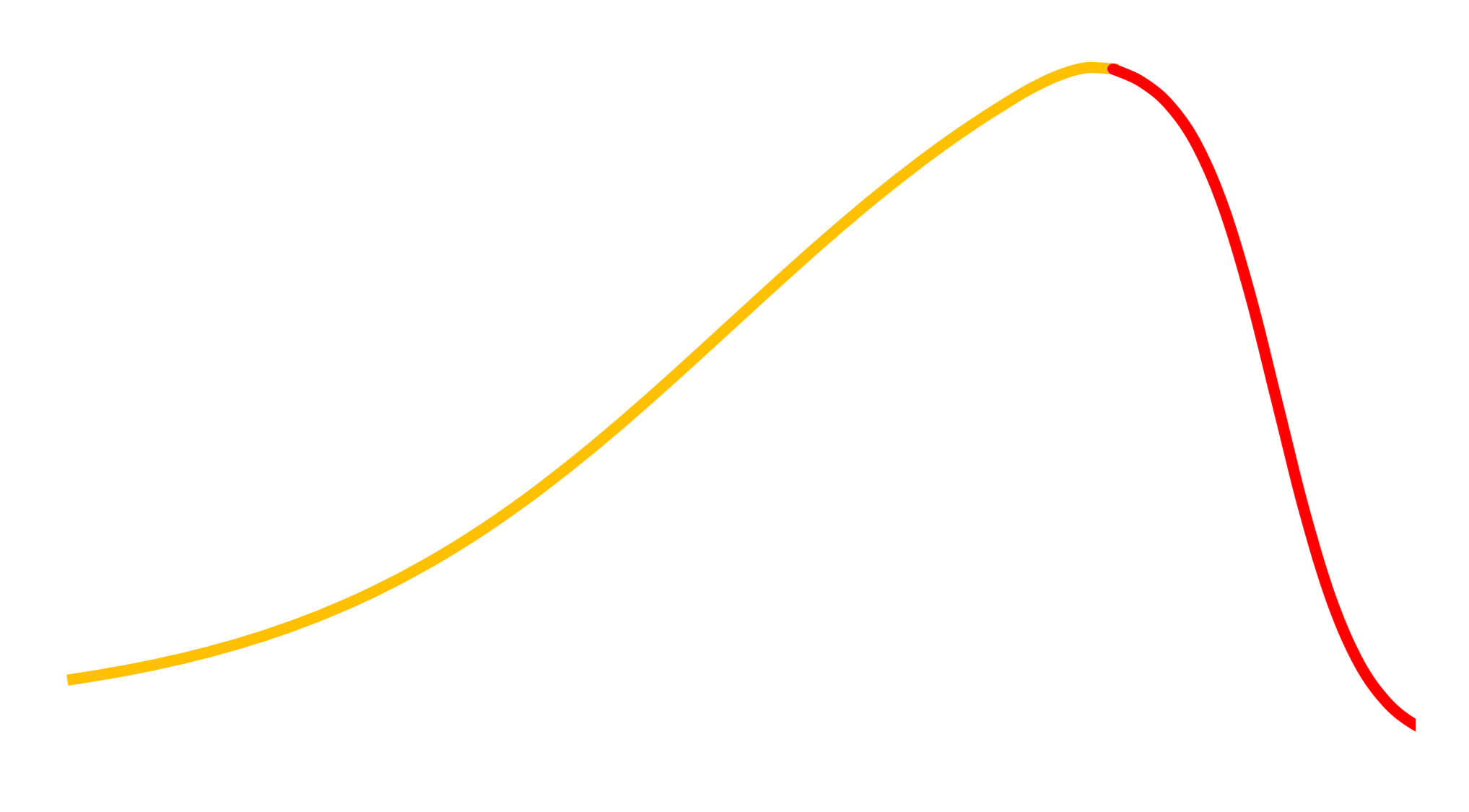
Illustration of asymmetrical growth and decline

The Seneca effect, or Seneca cliff or Seneca collapse, is a mathematical model proposed by Ugo Bardi to describe situations where a system's rate of decline is much sharper than its earlier rate of growth.

== Description ==
In 2017, Bardi published a book titled The Seneca Effect: When Growth is Slow but Collapse is Rapid, named after the Roman philosopher and writer Seneca, who wrote Fortune is of sluggish growth, but ruin is rapid (Letters to Lucilius, 91.6):

Whatever structure has been reared by a long sequence of years, at the cost of great toil and through the great kindness of the gods, is scattered and dispersed by a single day. Nay, he who has said "a day" has granted too long a postponement to swift-coming misfortune; an hour, an instant of time, suffices for the overthrow of empires! It would be some consolation for the feebleness of our selves and our works, if all things should perish as slowly as they come into being; but as it is, increases are of sluggish growth, but the way to ruin is rapid.

— Lucius Annaeus Seneca, Letters to Lucilius, 91.6

Bardi's book looked at cases of rapid decline across societies (including the fall of empires, financial crises, and major famines), in nature (including avalanches), and through man-made systems (including cracks in metal objects). Bardi concluded that rapid collapse is not a flaw, or "bug" as he terms it, but a "varied and ubiquitous phenomena" with multiple causes and resultant pathways. The collapse of a system can often clear the path for new, and better adapted, structures. In a 2019 book titled Before the Collapse: A Guide to the Other Side of Growth, Bardi describes a "Seneca Rebound" that often takes place where new systems replace the collapsed system, and often at a rate faster than preceding growth rates as the collapse has eliminated many of impediments or constraints from the previous system.

The "Seneca effect" model is related to the "World3" model from the 1972 report The Limits to Growth, issued by the Club of Rome.

== Use ==
One of the model's main practical applications has been to describe the resultant outcomes given the condition of a global shortage of fossil fuels. Unlike the symmetrical Hubbert curve fossil fuel model, the Seneca cliff model shows material asymmetry, where the global rate of decline in fossil fuel production is far steeper than forecasted by the Hubbert curve.

The term has also been used to describe rapid declines in businesses that had grown for decades, with the rapid post-2005 decline and resultant bankruptcy in Kodak as a quoted example.

== See also ==
- Hubbert curve
- Societal collapse
- Joseph Tainter
