= Barty =

Barty is a surname and, as a given name, a diminutive or short name of Bartholomew or other names, including Barton. It may refer to:

== Surname ==
- Ashleigh Barty (born 1996), Australian tennis player
- Billy Barty (1924–2000), American actor
- Braden Barty (born 1970), American director and producer, son of Billy
- Jack Barty (1888–1942), British actor
- James S. Barty (1806–1875), Scottish minister

== Nickname ==
- Barton Barty Smith (born 1952), American football player
- Bartemius Barty Crouch Sr., a fictional politician in the Harry Potter series
- Bartemius Barty Crouch Jr., a Death Eater, son of the above character

== See also ==
- Bardy (disambiguation) § People with the surname
- Bartee, surname
- Bharti (disambiguation)
