= Francesco Balducci Pegolotti =

Merchant and economist

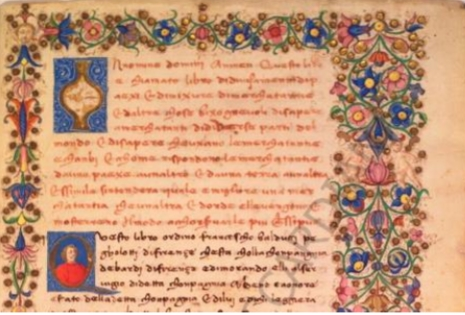
Pegolotti Pratica Ricc.2441 specimen half page.

Francesco Balducci Pegolotti (fl. 1290 – 1347), also Francesco di Balduccio, was a Florentine merchant and politician.

== Life ==
His father, Balduccio Pegolotti, represented Florence in commercial negotiations with Siena in 1311. His brother, Rinieri di Balduccio, was suspected of connivance in the disappearance of a gold shipment in 1332.

Francesco Pegolotti himself was a businessman in the service of the Compagnia dei Bardi, and in this capacity he was at Antwerp from 1315 (or earlier) to 1317. He was a director of the London office from 1317 to 1321, and is recorded (as Balduch) as having dealt directly with King Edward II. He was in Cyprus from 1324 to 1327, and again in 1335. In 1324 at Famagusta he negotiated a reduction of customs duties for the Compagnia dei Bardi and for those identified as Florentine merchants by the Bardi representative in the city. In 1335 he obtained from the King of Armenia a grant of privileges for Florentine trade. In 1331 and again in 1342 he was involved in Florentine politics as a Gonfalionere di Compagnia; in 1346 he held a higher position, Gonfalionere di Giustizia. In 1347, when the Compagnia dei Bardi collapsed, Pegolotti was among those who dealt with the consequences of the bankruptcy.

== Works ==
Between 1335 and 1343 he compiled the work for which he is famous, the Book of Descriptions of Countries and of Measures Employed in Business (Italian: Libro di divisamenti di paesi e di misuri di mercatanzie e daltre cose bisognevoli di sapere a mercatanti), commonly known as the Practice of Commerce (Pratica della mercatura). Beginning with a glossary of Italian and foreign terms then in use in trade, the Practice next describes nearly all the major trading cities then known to Italian merchants; the imports and exports of various regions; the business customs prevalent in each of those regions; and the comparative value of coinages, weights and measures. The most distant trade route described by Pegolotti is that from Azov via Astrakhan, Khiva, Otrar and Kulja to Beijing. He also details the route from Ayas on the Cilician coast of Turkey via Sivas, Erzingan and Erzerum to Tabriz in Persia.
