= Berardinetti =

Berardinetti is an Italian surname. Notable people with the surname include:

- Lorenzo Berardinetti (born 1961), Canadian politician
- Michelle Holland (formerly Berardinetti; born 1973), Canadian politician

== See also ==
- Berardinelli
