= Bardy (surname) =

Bardy is a surname, and may refer to:

- Aleksi Bardy (born 1970), Finnish television writer, screenwriter, and film producer
- György Bárdy (1921–2013), Hungarian actor
- Julien Bardy (born 1986), French-born Portuguese rugby union footballer
- Pierre Bardy (born 1992), French footballer
- Pierre Bardy (politician) (born 1987), Monegasque politician
- Pierre-Martial Bardy (1797–1869), Canadian teacher, doctor and political figure

== See also ==
- Bardi (surname)
- Jeanne Bardey
- Pardy
