= Barter (surname) =

Barter is a surname. Notable people with the surname include:

- Charles St Leger Barter (1857–1931), British soldier
- Frederick Barter (1891–1952), Welsh soldier
- Hugh Barter (born 2005), Australian-Japanese racing driver
- Jessica Barter, New Zealand architect
- John Barter (1917–1983), British politician
- Krystal Barter, Australian breast cancer survivor
- Marion Barter (born 1945), Australian missing person who has not been seen since 1997
- Peter Barter (1940–2022), Papua New Guinean politician
- Philip Barter (1939-2024), American painter
- Richard Barter (1802–1870), Irish physician
- Richard H. Barter (1833–1859), Canadian fugitive and murder victim
