= Apostolic Camera =

Central board of finance in the papal administrative system

The Apostolic Camera (Latin: Camera Apostolica), formerly known as the Papal Treasury, was an office in the Roman Curia. It was the central board of finance in the papal administrative system and at one time was of great importance in the government of the States of the Church and in the administration of justice, led by the Camerlengo of the Holy Roman Church, originally known as camerarius (chamberlain).

In 2022, Pope Francis's apostolic constitution Praedicate evangelium abolished the office as of 5 June.

== History ==
The office of camerarius (chamberlain) was established by Pope Urban II. Since the middle of the 12th century the Papal chamberlain (camerarius domini papae) was a regular member of the Curia, entrusted with the financial management of the papal court. At that early period the income of the papal treasury came chiefly from many kinds of censuses, dues, and tributes paid in from the territory subject to the Pope, and from churches and monasteries immediately dependent on him. Cencius Camerarius (later Pope Honorius III, r. 1216–1227) made in 1192 a new inventory of all these sources of papal revenue, known as the Liber Censuum. The previous list dated back to Gelasius I (492–496) and Gregory I (590–604), and was based on lists of the incomes accruing from the patrimonies, or landed property of the Roman Church.

In the 13th century the Apostolic Camera entered on a new phase of development. The collection of the Crusade taxes, regularly assessed after the time of Innocent III (1198–1216), imposed new duties on the papal treasury, to which were committed both the collection and distribution of these assessments. Moreover, during the course of this century the system of payment in kind was transformed into the monetary system, a process considerably influenced by the administration of the papal finances. The servitia communia of bishops and abbots (see Annates) were regulated at fixed sums. The income regularly yielded by them to the Curia is by no means small. To these were to be added the annates, taken in the narrower sense, especially the great universal reservations made since the time of Clement V and John XXII, the extraordinary subsidies, moreover, levied since the end of the thirteenth century, the census, and other assessments. The duties of the Apostolic Camera were thus constantly enlarged. For the collection of all these moneys it employed henceforth a great number of agents known as collectores.

With time the importance of this central department of finance became more marked. The highest administrative officers were always the chamberlain (camerarius) and the treasurer (thesaurarius) — the former regularly a bishop, the latter often of the same rank. Next in order came the clerics of the Camera (clerici cameræ), originally three or four, afterwards as many as ten. Next to these was the judge (auditor) of the Camera. The two first-named formed with the clerics of the Camera its highest administrative council; they controlled and looked closely to both revenues and expenses. In their service were a number of inferior officials, notaries, scribes, and messengers. The more absolute system of ruling the Church which developed after the beginning of the 16th century, as well as the gradual transformation in the financial administration, modified in many ways the duties of the Apostolic Camera. The Camerarius (camerlengo, chamberlain) became one of the highest officers in the government of the Papal States, until the beginning of the 19th century, when new methods of administration called for other officials.

In 1870 what remained of the Papal States was annexed to the Kingdom of Italy and ceased to exist, replaced by the diminutive Vatican City: the Apostolic Camera ceased almost entirely to exercise any practical influence on the papal administration, and the income of the papal treasury since chiefly derived from Peter's Pence and other donations contributed by the faithful, the Camera lost its practical importance as a board of finance, for the revenue known as Peter's Pence is managed by a special commission. The officials who since constituted the camera – the cardinal-camerlengo, the vice-camerlengo, the auditor, the general treasurer (an office unoccupied since 1870) and seven cameral clerics – hold in reality quasi-honorary offices.

== Officials ==
The Officials of the Apostolic Camera were:

- The Cardinal Camerlengo enters upon his chief duties on the occasion of a vacancy in the Holy See, during which time he is invested with a portion of the papal authority.
- The Vice Camerlengo, one of the highest prelates of the Roman Curia, was until 1870 governor of Rome, and was charged with the maintenance of peace and order in the city; during a vacancy in the Papal See he is even yet first in authority after the cardinals, and entrusted with the surveillance of the conclave, to which no one is admitted without his permission.
- The Auditor-General of the Camera, also one of the highest prelates, used to be the chief judge in all cases concerning the financial administration of the Curia. Before 1870 he presided over the supreme court, to which the Pope referred the most important questions for decision.
- The Treasurer General used to have supreme financial control of the whole income derived from the temporal possessions of the Church, as well as the rest of the tribute accruing to the papal treasury.
- The College of Clerics of the Apostolic Camera has had seven members since 1870; before that, its membership varied in size. The members of the body, chosen from among the highest prelates, used to have the management of the property and income of the Holy See, and were consulted collectively on all important questions concerning their administration, but also officiated as a court in all disputes affecting the papal exchequer. When Pius IX, after the installation of the various ministries, divided among them the administrative duties, he assigned to each cleric of the Camera the presidency of a section of the department of finance. Four of them, moreover, were members of the commission appointed to examine the accounts of the Camera, entitled to special places whenever the Pope appears in public on solemn occasions, in the papal processions, and in public consistories. At the death of the Pontiff they take possession of the Apostolic palaces, attend to the taking of the inventories, and manage the internal or domestic administration during the vacancy. In the conclave they had charge of all that pertains to the table of the cardinals. Apart from this, the clerics of the Camera are usually professors and canons, with regular ecclesiastical appointments.

== Other offices ==
The Apostolic Camera must be distinguished from the treasury or camera of the College of Cardinals, presided over by the cardinal-camerlengo (Camerarius Sacri Collegii Cardinalium). It had charge of the common revenues of the College of Cardinals, and appears among the curial institutions after the close of the 13th century. It has long ceased to exist.

== See also ==
- Avignon Exchange
- Bank of the Holy Spirit
- Christian finance
