= Peruzzi =

Family

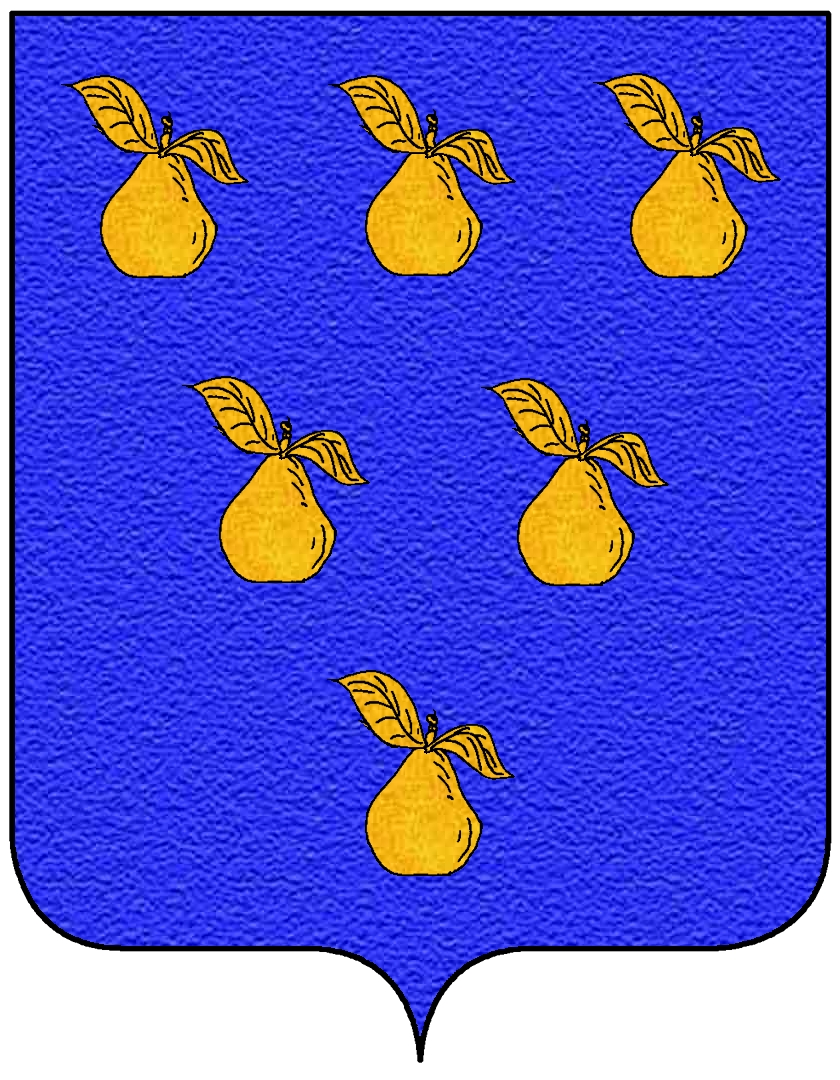
Peruzzi family coat of arms

The Peruzzi family were bankers of Florence, among the leading families of the city in the 14th century, before the rise to prominence of the Medici. Their modest antecedents stretched back to the mid 11th century, according to the family's genealogist Luigi Passerini, but a restructuring of the Peruzzi company in the 1340's, with an infusion of outside capital, marked the start of a quarter-century of prosperity that brought the family consortium to the forefront of Florentine affairs.

== Patronage ==
Semi-public patronage reaffirmed the Peruzzi status in Florence: in his will in 1299, Donato di Arnoldo Peruzzi left money for a memorial chapel in a transept of the Basilica of Santa Croce, Florence. It was probably his grandson Giovanni di Rinieri Peruzzi who was Giotto's patron in frescoing the walls with murals honoring John the Evangelist and John the Baptist, which Giotto executed, starting in 1313.

For economic historians, the surviving account books of the Peruzzi from the years 1335–1343 provide an indispensable primary source for the economic history of the city on the cusp of the late Medieval and Early Modern period. The contemporary chronicler Giovanni Villani is the other prime source for the family's affairs.

== Company ==
The company that bore the Peruzzi name was run by a half-dozen family members, and there were many Peruzzi who were neither active nor silent partners, pursuing other careers, even amassing independent capital. The company's courier system acted as an intelligence-gathering system often embroiled in diplomacy. The size of the bank should not be understated: by the 1330s, the Peruzzi bank was the second largest in Europe, with fifteen branches from the Middle East to London, all capitalized to the sum of more than 100,000 gold florins and manned by approximately 100 factors.

Peruzzi capital had been amassed in the textile business that was the main engine of Florence's prosperity. English wool finished as high-quality cloth in Bruges was bought by Peruzzi fattori and distributed to the luxurious courts of Paris, Avignon or returned to London. Peruzzi connections with the Knights Hospitallers gained them important local leverage in Rhodes, the economic capital of the Aegean and a transshipping port for silks, drugs, spices and luxuries from the East. Trade beyond Italy required agents and instruments of credit, extending the family business beyond its extended membership into an international network. In Italy the double-entry bookkeeping was developed that made such complicated financial transactions possible. By the opening of the 14th century, the main activity of the Peruzzi had switched to wholesale commodities trading on a very large scale, especially in grain exported from France to the central Italian cities—for which they were granted a monopoly— and to banking, the field for which they are remembered: popes, nobles, bourgeois, towns and abbeys drew loans from the Peruzzi. But great clients incurred great risks. In 1343 the Peruzzi consortium collapsed and was bankrupt in 1345, with their partners in risk-capital, the Bardi.

== Unsecured loans ==
The traditional explanation, of unsecured loans extended to Edward III of England, is currently considered simplistic. In fact, several factors destabilized the network of trade. The war with Castruccio Castracani of Lucca bled Florentine specie to pay for mercenaries, while France and England went to war over Aquitaine, and the peasants of Flanders rose up in a revolt that was put down with the aid of mercenaries purchased with Peruzzi florins.

Not all of the family fortunes were lost in the bankruptcy, and the Peruzzi continued to figure among the prominent families of Florence, the patrizii di Firenze. Even as late as 1849, in the wake of the disturbances of 1848, the gonfaloniere of Florence was Ubaldino Peruzzi.

== Family commune ==
The tower of the fortified Villa Peruzzi in the commune of Antella south of Florence controls the main road into the Chianti district.

Members of the family who emigrated to America in the late 19th century and settled in Pennsylvania founded the Peruzzi chain of automobile dealerships and the Planters Nut and Chocolate Company.

== See also ==
- Gran Tavola
- Bardi family
- Acciaioli family
- List of banks in Italy
