= Bardo (surname) =

Bardo is a surname. Notable people with the surname include:

- Clinton L. Bardo (1868–1937), American businessman
- John Bardo (1948–2019), American educator
- Natalia Bardo (born 1988), Russian actress, singer and TV host
- Robert John Bardo (born 1970), American criminal
- Stephen Bardo (born 1968), professional basketball player
