= Panos Bardis =

Greek American sociologist

Panos D. Bardis
- Born: September 24, 1924; Arcadia, Greece
- Died: August 8, 1996 (aged 71)

Panos Demetrios Bardis (1924–1996) was a Greek American sociologist specializing in study of the family across cultures. He was professor of sociology at the University of Toledo.

== Works ==
=== Monographs ===
- The family in changing civilizations (1969)
- Encyclopedia of campus unrest (1971)
- Studies in marriage and the family (1975)
- The future of the Greek language in the United States (1976)
- The family in Asia (1979) [coauthor Man Singh Das]
- History of thanatology: philosophical, religious, psychological, and sociological ideas concerning death, from primitive times to the present (1981)
- Dictionary of quotations in sociology (1985)
- Marriage and family: continuity, change, and adjustment (1988)
- South Africa and the Marxist movement: a study in double standards (1989)

=== Articles ===
- "Synopsis and Evaluation of Theories Concerning Family Evolution", Social Science 38 (1963): 42–52.

=== Reviews ===
- W. K. Lacey, The Family in Classical Greece (1968). Reviewed for Journal of Marriage and the Family 34 (1972): 180–181.
- "Silent Dr. X" / Panos Bardis. "EI" Magazine of European Art Center (EUARCE) 6st issue 1994 p. 13&24-25
- Panos Bardis died. "Apodemon Epos" Magazine of European Art Center (EUARCE) of Greece, 3st issue 1997 p.4 https://docs.wixstatic.com/ugd/bbb0cf_a70a7dadf1f844cab45b9708dea20fcf.pdf
- Panos Bardis. The more fascinated I am, the more I believe(A')."Apodemon Epos" Magazine of European Art Center (EUARCE) of Greece, 5st issue 1998 p.1-5 https://docs.wixstatic.com/ugd/bbb0cf_154eb57bcb214901b001eb7ec1db0634.pdf
- Panos Bardis. The more fascinated I am, the more I believe(B')."Apodemon Epos" Magazine of European Art Center (EUARCE) of Greece, 6st issue 1998 p.1-3 https://docs.wixstatic.com/ugd/bbb0cf_f3fad7ebc5e24ddf973a40e15b54074e.pdf
