= Ugo Bardi =

Italian physical chemist

Ugo Bardi (born 23 May 1952 in Florence, Italy) is a professor of physical chemistry at the University of Florence.

== Career ==
Bardi is a researcher on materials for new energy sources and a contributor to the now-defunct website, "The Oil Drum". He is the co-founder and former president of ASPO Italy, a member of the scientific committee of the Association for the Study of Peak Oil and Gas (ASPO), a member of the Club of Rome, and author of several books, including The Limits to Growth Revisited.

== Personal life ==
Bardi was married in 1976 to his wife, Grazia, and is a father of two, Francesco and Donata.

== Works ==
=== Books ===
- Bardi, Ugo (2003). La fine del petrolio (in Italian). Ed. Riuniti. ISBN 9788835954255.
- Bardi, Ugo; Pancani, Giovanni (2006). Storia petrolifera del bel paese (in Italian). Ed. Le Balze. ISBN 8875391262.
- Bardi, Ugo (2008). Il libro della Chimera (in Italian). Firenze: Ed. Polistampa. ISBN 9788859603658.
- Bardi, Ugo (2011). The Limits to Growth Revisited. Springer Briefs in Energy. ISBN 9781441994158..
- Bardi, Ugo (2011). La Terra svuotata. Editori Riuniti. ISBN 9788864730677.
- Bardi, Ugo (2014). Extracted. How the Quest for Mineral Wealth is Plundering the Planet. Chelsea Green Publishing. ISBN 9781603585415.
- Bardi, Ugo (2017). The Seneca Effect: Why Growth is Slow but Collapse is Rapid. Springer International Publishing. ISBN 978-3-319-57206-2.
- Bardi, Ugo (2020). Before the Collapse. A guide to the other side of Growth. Springer International Publishing. doi:10.1007/978-3-030-29038-2. ISBN 978-3-030-29037-5. S2CID 204741627.
- Bardi, Ugo; Perissi, Ilaria (2021). The Empty Sea: The Future of the Blue Economy. Springer International Publishing. doi:10.1007/978-3-030-51898-1. ISBN 978-3-030-51897-4. S2CID 231905322.
- Bardi, Ugo; Alvarez Pereira, Carlos, eds. (2022). Limits and Beyond: 50 Years on from The Limits to Growth, what Did We Learn and What's Next?. Exapt Press. ISBN 9781914549038.

=== Journals ===
- Ugo Bardi, Andrea Atrei, Gianfranco Rovida, Initial stages of oxidation of the Ni₃Al alloy: structure and composition of the aluminum oxide overlayer studied by XPS, LEIS and LEED. In: Surface Science 268, Issues 1–3, (1992), 87–97, doi:10.1016/0039-6028(92)90952-3.
- Andrea Balduccia, Ugo Bardi, Stefano Caporali, Marina Mastragostino, and Francesca Soavi, Ionic liquids for hybrid supercapacitors. In: Electrochemistry Communications 6, Issue 6, (2004), 566–570, doi:10.1016/j.elecom.2004.04.005.
- Gaia Ballerini, Ugo Bardi, Roberto Bignucolo, Giuseppe Ceraolo, About some corrosion mechanisms of AZ91D magnesium alloy. In: Corrosion Science 47, Issue 9, (2005), 2173–2184, doi:10.1016/j.corsci.2004.09.018.
- Ugo Bardi, The mineral economy: a model for the shape of oil production curves. In: Energy Policy 33, Issue 1, (2005), 53–61, doi:10.1016/S0301-4215(03)00197-6.
- Stefano Caporali, Alessio Fossati, Alessandro Lavacchi, Ilaria Perissi, Alexander Tolstogouzov, Ugo Bardi, Aluminium electroplated from ionic liquids as protective coating against steel corrosion. In: Corrosion Science 50, Issue 2, 2008, 534–539, doi:10.1016/j.corsci.2007.08.001.
- Ilaria Perissi, Ugo Bardi, Stefano Caporali, Alessio Fossati, Alessandro Lavacchi, Ionic liquids as diathermic fluids for solar trough collectors’ technology: A corrosion study. In: Solar Energy Materials and Solar Cells 92, Issue 4, (2008), 510–517, doi:10.1016/j.solmat.2007.11.007.
- Ugo Bardi, Peak oil: The four stages of a new idea. In: Energy 34, Issue 3, (2009), 323–326, doi:10.1016/j.energy.2008.08.015.

== See also ==
- Seneca cliff
- Hubbert curve
- Club of Rome
