= Compagnia dei Bardi =

Medieval Florentine merchant company

The Compagnia dei Bardi was a Florentine banking and trading company which was started by the Bardi family, and which became one of the major medieval “super-companies” of the 14th Century.

== History ==
The Bardi company was one of three major Florentine banking companies (called "super-companies" by some modern scholars) that assembled large amounts of capital and established wide-ranging, diversified business networks, doing business throughout the Mediterranean and in England.

The Bardi company traded oil and wine, and had close economic ties to southern Italy and Sicily. Their chief product, however, was high-quality woolen cloth. The Bardi were the largest of these super-companies and seem to have been 50 percent larger than their closest rival, the Peruzzi company.

In 1344, at about the same time as the Peruzzi company, the Bardi company went bankrupt and the Florentine writer Giovanni Villani blamed this on the repudiation of war loans by King Edward III of England. However, Villani was not an independent source; his brother was a member of the Peruzzi company that also went bankrupt. Villanni said that Edward owed the Bardi 900,000 gold florins (£135,000) and the Peruzzi 600,000 (£90,000). However, the Peruzzi's records show that they never had that much capital to lend Edward III. Edward did not default on all his loans and repaid some with cash and others with royal grants of wool, a principal export of the English economy at the time.

At the time Florence was going through a period of internal disputes and the third largest financial company, the Acciaiuoli, also went bankrupt and they did not lend any money to Edward. What loans Edward III did default on are likely only to have contributed to the financial problems in Florence, not caused them. The bankruptcy of the Bardi and Peruzzi companies marked the decline of the medieval super-companies.

The Bardi company survived bankruptcy and subsequently provided significant funding for several of the voyages of discovery to the Americas. For a time, both the celebrated medieval author, Giovanni Boccaccio, and his father Boccaccino di Chellino, worked for the Bardi company.
