= Krystal Barter =

Australian activist

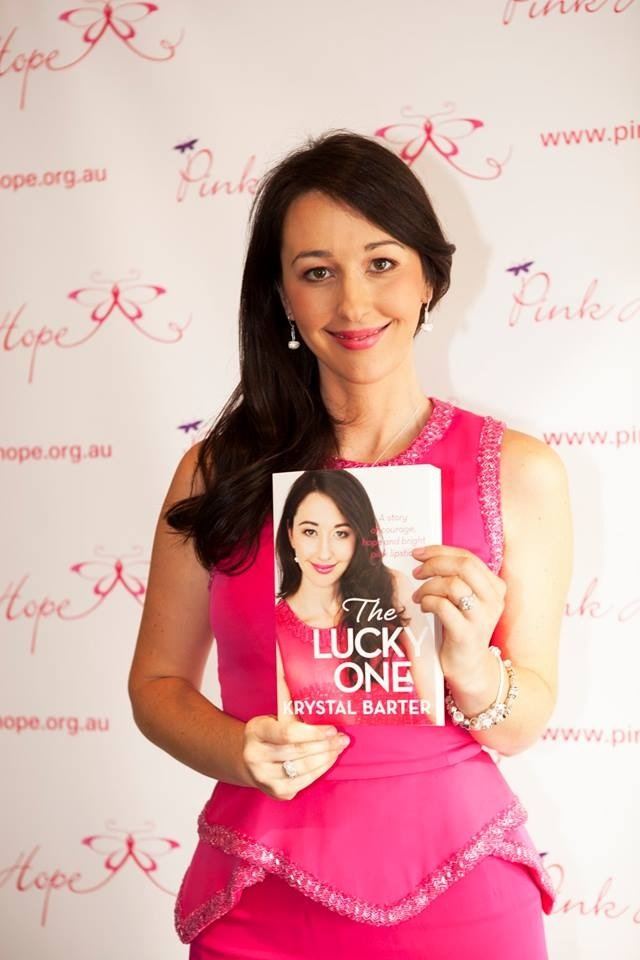
- Krystal Barter at the launch of her memoir The Lucky One

Krystal Barter is an Australian health activist, author and founder of Humanise Health, A patient-led & advocacy agency working with businesses in the health sector.

She was detected to have the BRCA1 gene at an early age and opted to undertake a preventative double mastectomy. Barter also had ovarian prevention surgery in 2014. She has written a book called The Lucky One, about her experiences. She was honoured with Finalist Young Australian of the Year in 2012, NSW Woman of the Year and Harper's Bazaar Woman of Influence. In March 2014, Margie Abbott launched Barter's first published Memoir alongside Karl Stefanovic and Sarah Murdoch with the Sydney Morning Herald, hailing her as Australia's own Angelina Jolie.

== Biography ==
When Barter was 22, she was detected to have the BRCA1 gene, a gene that significantly increases the chance of getting breast or ovarian cancer. Because Barter's great grandmother, grandmother and mother all had breast cancer, she realized that there was a high likelihood that she would as well. At the time, she did not have any symptoms of the cancer but ovarian cancer had killed 903 Australians in 2011 and she did not want to be one of these people. Barter decided to have a preventative double mastectomy to remove both breasts and prevent getting this type of cancer.

In 2009, Barter had her preventative double mastectomy when she was 25 years old. She was married with two young sons at the time and made the decision after wanting to be in their lives for many years to come. She was one of the first Australians to share her journey with the public to raise awareness that prevention is an option.

Barter founded not for profit organisation, Pink Hope, from her hospital bed after her surgery. She wanted the struggles her family had gone through to help change and inform other people with hereditary cancer. Barter found Pink Hope to provide support and information to them because when she found out about her BRCA1 gene, and was considering a preventative mastectomy, she had no one to turn to for advice. "I was alone and isolated, there was nobody my age who making the choices," Barter said. In regards to Pink Hope's mission she has also said: “Having experienced the isolation and lack of information for high risk women like me, I decided to be proactive about helping others which lead to me creating Pink Hope. I have made it my personal mission to provide information, resources and support for the high risk community”.

Later, in 2014, Barter also had her fallopian tubes and ovaries removed to dramatically reduce her risk for ovarian cancer.

In 2014, Barter met Angelina Jolie when Jolie visited Sydney for the premiere of her film Unbroken. Both Barter and Jolie are both carriers of a genetic mutation called BRCA.

Barter is a wife, and mother of three. Her grandmother died after fighting recurring cancers for many years.

She had a double mastectomy when she was 25 years old because her family had a history of cancer and she wanted to be sure she didn't develop it as well.

== Awards ==
- Madison Magazine Inspirational Woman 2012
- Finalist Instyle Audi Women of Style Awards
- Women of Influence Harpers Bazaar 2011
- Warringah Young Citizen of the Year 2010
