= Bardi Altarpiece =

Bardi Altarpiece may refer to at least two paintings:

- The Bardi Altarpiece by Sandro Botticelli, 1484–85, now in Berlin
- Bardi Altarpiece (Parmigianino), c. 1521, now Church of Santa Maria at Bardi, Emilia-Romagna, Italy
