= Philip Barter =

American painter (1939–2024)

- Born: December 13, 1939; Boothbay Harbor, Maine, U.S.
- Died: April 23, 2024 (aged 84); Franklin, Maine, U.S.
- Occupation: Painter
- Known for: Colorful landscapes

Philip Barter (December 13, 1939 – April 23, 2024) was an American painter from Maine. His artwork is in the collections of the Bates College Museum of Art and the Farnsworth Art Museum.
