= Donato de' Bardi =

Italian painter

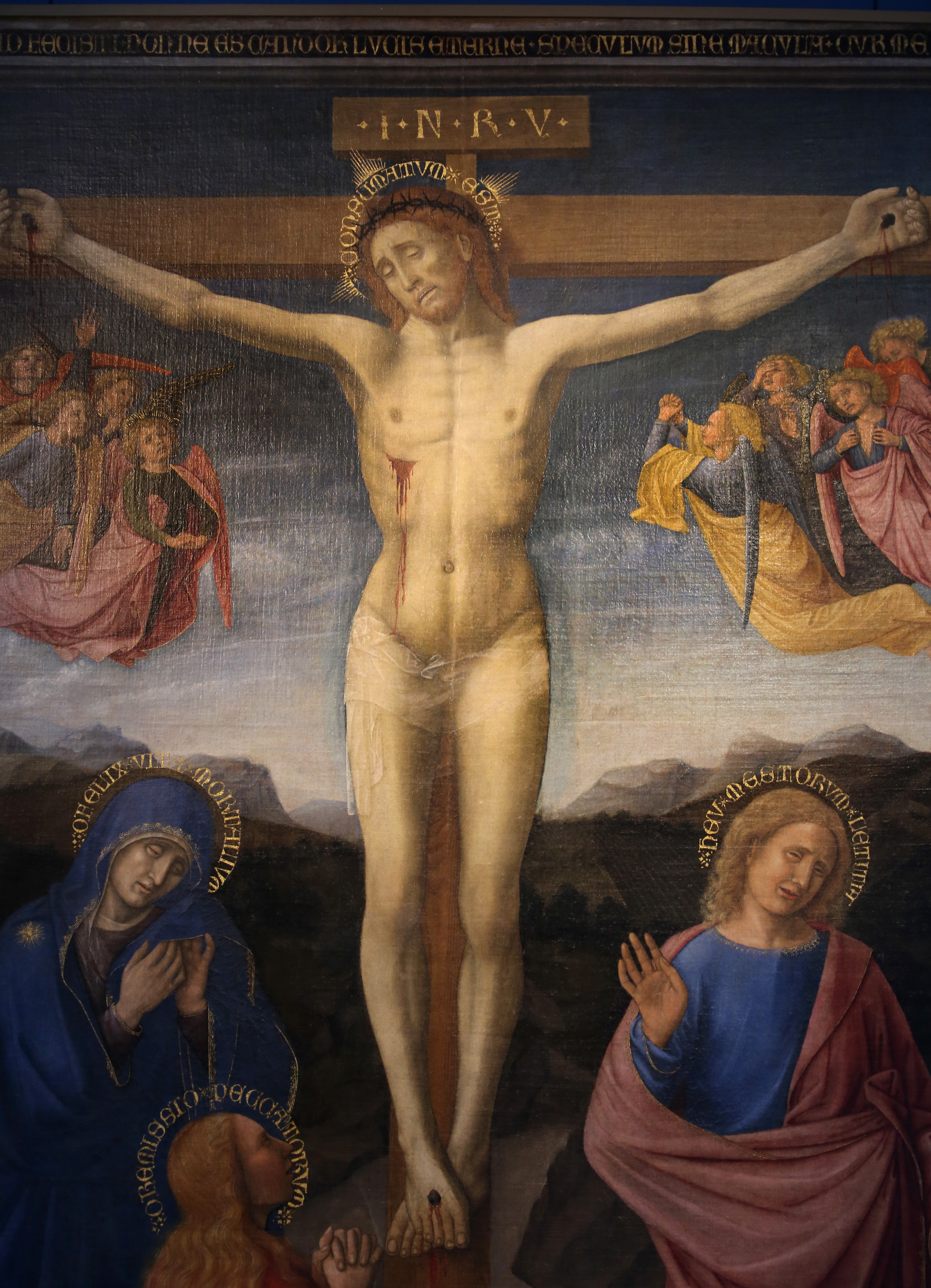
Donato de' Bardi, Crucifixion of the Saviour

Donato Conte de' Bardi (Active 1426 – 1450/1451) was an Italian painter of the Quattrocento period. He was born in Pavia. He is cited as a painter in Genoa in 1426. In 1433, he painted an altarpiece of the Crucifixion with the Magdalen and Saints for the Cathedral. Another Crucifixion with Saints was painted for the Ospedale di San Paolo in Savona. A Maesta was completed after his death by Giovanni Giorgio in 1451. His work shows some Flemish influences. His brother Boniforte was also a painter.

== Biography ==
He trained in the workshops of international Gothic in Lombardy, with the first works related to the style of Giusto de' Menabuoi or Michelino da Besozzo. His early contacts with Flemish culture helped him develop a more personal and unique style. Some have suggested that he made a visit to Flanders, but his presence in Genoa, the center of Provençal and Flemish painting in Italy, would be enough to explain his knowledge.

Among the first works by Donato de 'Bardi that recorded the change in style there were a Madonna of Humility with Saints Philip and Agnes (1440), now at the Metropolitan Museum in New York, from 1445 to 1451 four tablets are known of a dismembered altarpiece (St. Jerome at the Brooklyn Museum in New York, St. John the Baptist in the Pinacoteca di Brera, St. Stephen and St. Ambrose in a private collection in Milan) and a Crucifixion (1448) to the civic Art Gallery of Savona.

A document dated 1450 discovered by Federico Zeri in the seventies shows how his brother Boniforte ask a reduction in taxes by the Republic of Genoa because of their status as refugees, exiled from their native town for political reasons. This document also mentions Brother Donato, who exercised the art "only for the pleasure of the spirit", as a testimony to their high social status.
