= Berardo =

Berardo is a given name and a surname. Notable people with this name include:

- Saint Berardo of Teramo (died 1123), Italian saint
- Saint Berardo dei Marsi (1079–1130), Italian saint
- Berardo di Castagna (died 1252), Italian Roman Catholic archbishop
- Berardo Eroli (1409–1479), Italian Roman Catholic bishop and cardinal
- Joe Berardo (born 1944), Portuguese businessman
- Rubina Berardo (born 1982), Portuguese politician

== See also ==
- Bardi (surname)
