= Mario Bardi =

Italian painter (1922–1998)

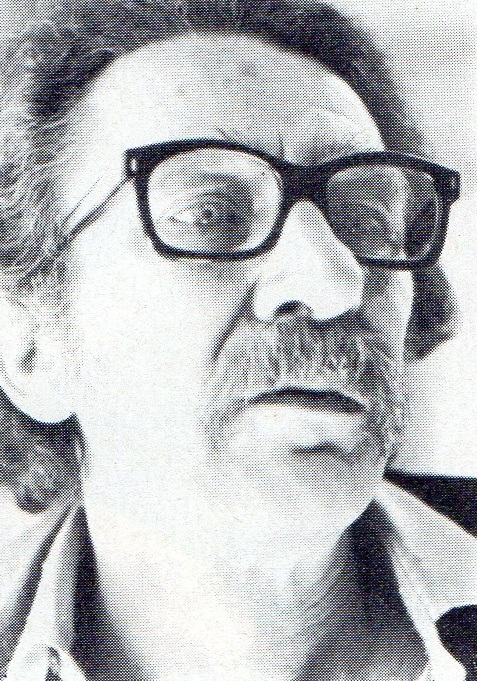
- Born: January 1922; Palermo, Sicily, Italy
- Died: 7 September 1998 (aged 76); Milan
- Known for: paintings, design
- Website: mariobardi.it

Mario Bardi (January 1922 – 7 September 1998) was an Italian Realist painter. He was born in Palermo, in the Mediterranean island of Sicily in southern Italy, in January 1922.

In 1947, he gave up his studies in engineering and went to the Accademia di Belle Arti di Palermo, where he graduated in 1951. In the same year he moved to Aosta, in Val d'Aosta in north-west Italy. In 1954 he was in Turin, in Piemonte. He moved to Milan, in Lombardy in northern Italy, in the early 1960s. Bardi won the Premio Suzzara in 1963 and the Premio Tettamanti in 1964 and again in 1966. He died in Milan of a stroke on 7 September 1998.

The Sicilian writer Leonardo Sciascia wrote of Bardi: "there is nothing in his painting which Sicily cannot explain". (Note: "Non c'è niente nella sua pittura che la Sicilia non possa spiegare".)
