= Bardi family =

Italian banking family

Bardi
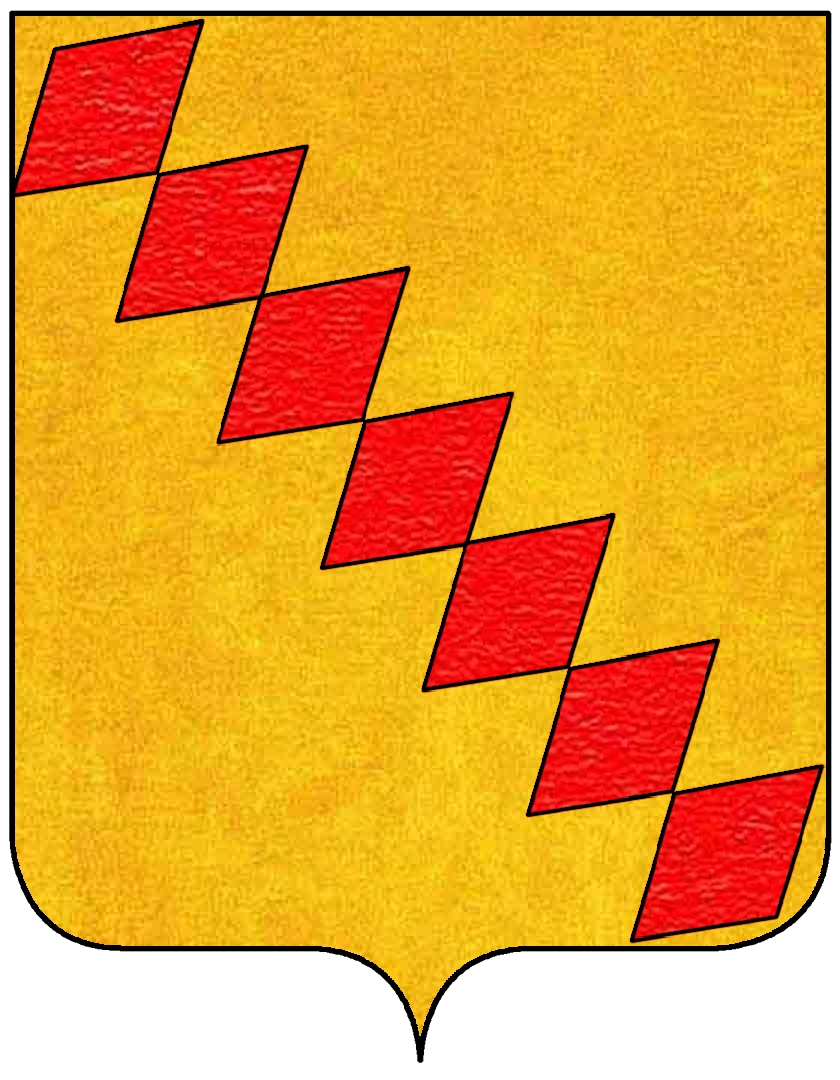
- Country: Republic of Florence; Grand Duchy of Tuscany; Papal States
- Place of origin: Tuscany, Italy
- Founded: 10th century
- Final ruler: Pier Maria de' Bardi
- Titles: Count of Vernio
- Dissolution: 1810

The House of Bardi was an influential Florentine family that started the powerful banking company Compagnia dei Bardi. In the 14th century, the Bardis lent Edward III of England 900,000 gold florins, a debt which he failed to repay along with 600,000 florins borrowed from the Peruzzi family, leading to the collapse of both families' banks. During the 15th century, the Bardi family continued to operate in various European centres, playing a notable role in financing some of the early voyages of discovery to the Americas including those by Christopher Columbus and John Cabot.

== History ==
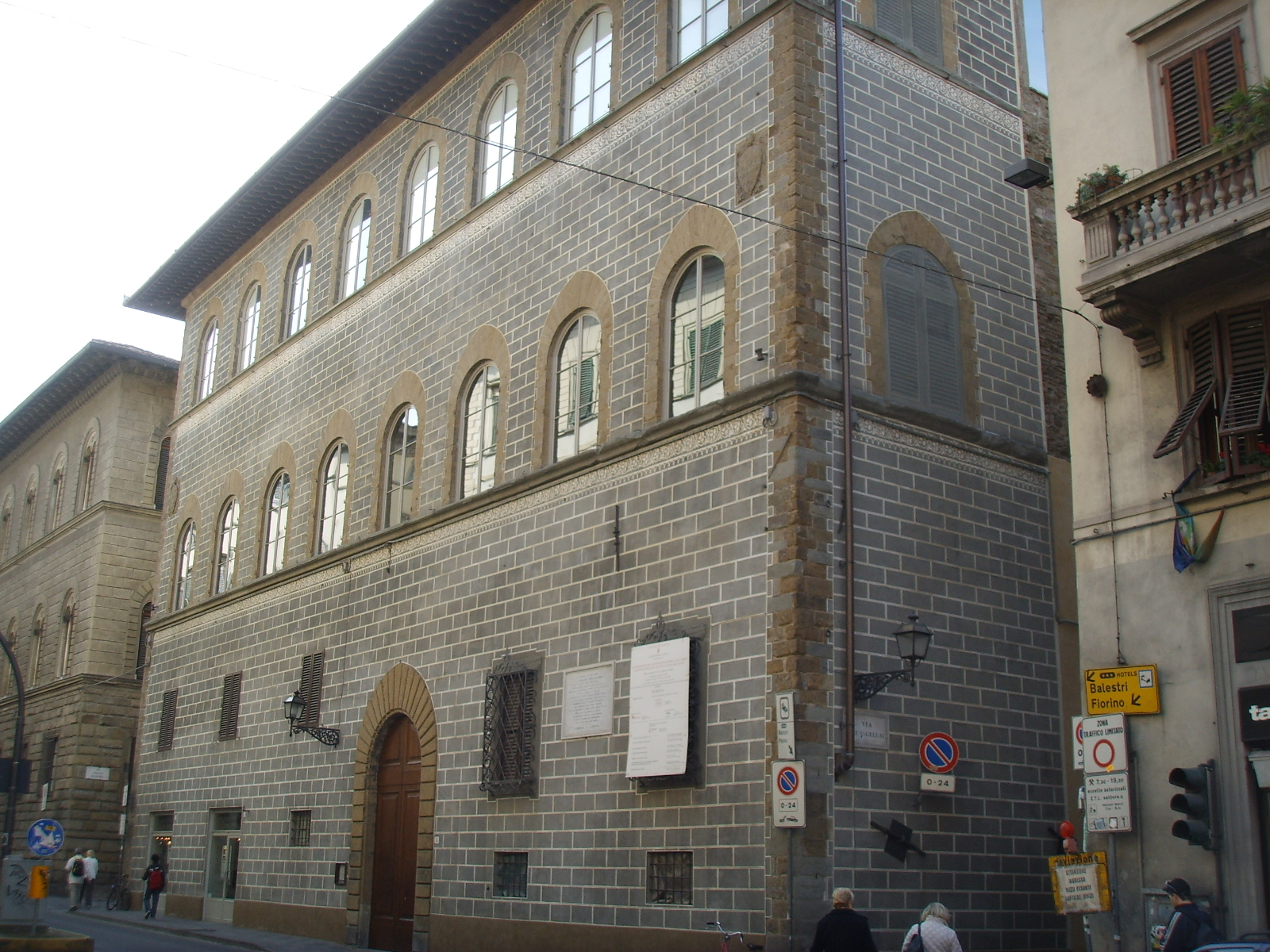
Palazzo Busini Bardi, Florence

The nobility of the Bardi family has been documented since the year 1164, when Emperor Friedrich Barbarossa relinquished the county of Vernio to Count Alberto along with "the right to confer the noble title on his descendents." Countess Margherita, the last of Alberto's line, sold Vernio to her son-in-law, Piero de' Bardi. Alberto's property included "a castle and nine communes" located 22 miles from Florence on an area that bordered the Mugello. During the 14th century, the Bardi family became so powerful that the Florentine government considered them a threat. They eventually were forced to sell their castle to Florence because "fortified castles near the city were seen as a danger to the republic."

In 1215, loyalties were pledged by members of the Bardi ahead of future wars: Gualterotto de' Bardi, a canon, pledged his service in the Fifth Crusade, and in the same year, the Bardi took up the cause of the Buondelmonti family (and thus the Guelph faction) in the fighting between Guelphs and Ghibellines. Gualterotto helped the crusaders successfully capture Damietta in 1219, and as a result was made Bishop of Acre. When the Battle of Montaperti took place in 1260, Geri di Ricco de' Bardi fought under the Guelph flag and was subsequently exiled when the Ghibellines won. Geri's nephew Cino then fought at the Battle of Campaldino alongside Dante Alighieri in 1289, when the Guelphs won.

In the 1290s, the Bardi and Peruzzi families had established branches in England and were the main European bankers by the 1320s. By the 14th century, the Bardi and the Peruzzi family grew tremendously wealthy by offering financial services. These two families facilitated trade by providing the merchants with bills of exchange, known today as checks. What made it so simple was that money paid by a debtor in one town could be paid out to a creditor just by presenting the bill in another town. By 1338, there were more than eighty banking houses in Florence. The Bardi family had thirteen different branches located in Barcelona, Seville, and Mallorca, in Paris, Avignon, Nice, and Marseille, in London, Bruges, Constantinople, Rhodes, Cyprus, and Jerusalem. Some of Europe's most powerful rulers were indebted to the Bardi family. This was one of the main reasons of the bankers' downfall.

During the Hundred Years War in the early 1340s, Edward III of England was engaged in an expensive war with France. He borrowed 600,000 silver florins from the Peruzzi banking family and another 900,000 from the Bardi family. In 1345, Edward III defaulted on his payments, causing both banking families to go bankrupt.

Despite the failure of the bank, the Bardi family ranked among Italy's most successful merchants and continued to benefit from their noble status. Numerous family members occupied important positions such as crusaders and ambassadors to the Pope in Rome; some were even knights. The marriage of Contessina de' Bardi to Cosimo de' Medici around 1415 was a key factor in establishing the House of Medici in power in Florence. Cosimo rewarded the Bardi family for their support, restoring their political rights upon his ascent in 1434. In 1444, he exempted them from paying particular taxes.

Besides banking, the Bardi family were "great patrons of the friars." Louis of Toulouse (1274–1297), the Franciscan bishop who was canonized in 1317, was very close to the Bardi family. They purchased the chapel that was dedicated to St. Francis. To the right of the altar they built a new, larger chapel and dedicated it to Louise of Toulouse. The Bardi chapel that was dedicated to St. Francis was founded by Ridolfo de Bardi around 1310, the year that his father died and left him with a large inheritance and in charge of the Bardi company. There were other Bardi chapels, such as the one dedicated to St. Lawrence and the Martyrs, and St. Silvestor and the Confessors.

Two important paintings, both called the Bardi Altarpiece, are by Sandro Botticelli (1484-85, now in Berlin), and by Parmigianino, the latter named after the town rather than the family. One of the family palaces in Florence was the Palazzo Busini Bardi.

== See also ==
- Bardi (surname)
- Gran Tavola
- Acciaioli family
- Fugger family
- List of banks in Italy
