= Joseph G. Fucilla =

- Born: December 14, 1897; Chicago, Illinois
- Died: March 22, 1981 (aged 83); Evanston, Illinois
- Occupation(s): Hispanist and lexicographer

Joseph Guerin Fucilla (14 December 1897 – 22 March 1981) born in Chicago, December 14, 1897, deceased in Evanston, Illinois, March 22, 1981, was a Hispanist and an American lexicographer.

== Biography ==
In 1880, his family left Cosenza in Southern Italy and immigrated to New York City. Fucilla was born in Chicago on 14 December 1897. He was the oldest of seven children of Giovanni Fucilla and Maria Carmela De Marco. He studied at the University of Wisconsin and taught at the Iowa State University (1921–23), and at the Butler University (1923–1928). He received a doctoral degree from the University of Chicago in 1928 and worked as a professor of the Department of Romanic Languages of Northwestern University in which he became a full professor in 1936, (emeritus professor from 1948) until his retirement in 1966. He was a visiting professor at the University of Wisconsin in Madison, the University of California, Santa Barbara and the University of Colorado. Fucilla died on 22 March 1981 in Evanston, Illinois.

== Works ==
One of his first works was ¨Our Italian surnames¨, published in Evanston in 1949, in which his knowledge of onomastics and dialectology are evidenced. He elaborated a much celebrated Fucilla's Spanish Dictionary (New York City, 1961) which was reprinted several times and prepared and corrected several anthologies for students of several main literary works of Spanish writers. As a translator of Italian to English he showed a particular interest in the 18th century dramaturgist Pietro Metastasio. He mainly studied the Italian imprint in Hispanic and Portuguese literatures. In 1953 he published a series of studies in Madrid, entitled ¨Hispano-Italian Relations¨ and in the same year a more comprehensive work, ¨Studies and Notes (Literary and Historical) published in Rome and Naples. In 1960, he achieved his works on the scholar works on the petrarchists with his famous ¨Studies on petrarchism in Spain (Madrid; C.S.I.C., 1960). He still published ¨Superbi colli e altri saggi (Rome, Carucci, 1963). He was the editor of Vicente García de la Huerta's novel ¨The Rachel¨, (Madrid, Anaya, 1965, republished by Catedra, 1981). He is among the most credited scholar on history of Romanic literatures.
