= Robert de Bardis =

Robert de Bardis was a 14th-century Chancellor of the University of Paris and a member of the Florentine Bardi banking family. He became chancellor of the Sorbonne in 1336. His financial resources placed him on the same level as the chancellor of Seville. de Bardis was a highly regarded scholar of St. Augustine and a friend of Petrarch.

== Involvement with heresy courts ==
It is likely that the papal commission which prosecuted Nicholas of Autrecourt acquired information from the Bishop of Paris and de Bardis.

In the spring of 1347 the examination of the ideas of John of Mirecourt began in response to a letter to the university from Pope Clement VI. After charges were brought against him, John of Mirecourt presented the written text of Lectura. de Bardis submitted the text to a select group of regent masters who were given the work of evaluation. The task was a two-stage process which was similar to the proceedings against William of Ockham which took place at Avignon. The language of the official list and condemnation has survived.
