= Orlando Bonsignori =

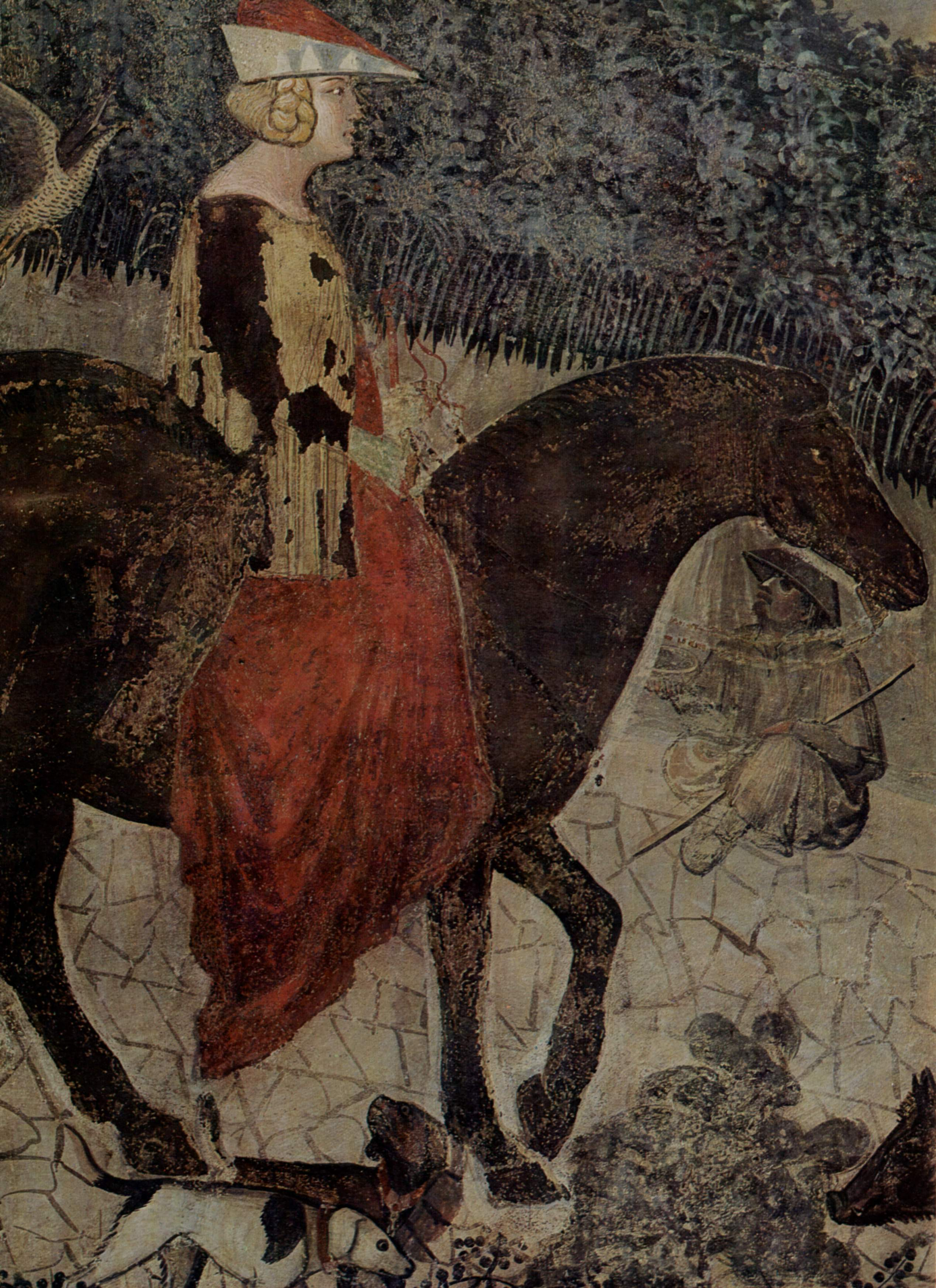
Orlando Bonsignori

Orlando Bonsignori (died 1273) was an Italian banker from Siena.

He was the son of Bonsignore di Bernardo, a minor merchant, but Orlando, together with his brother Bonifazio, expanded the family fortunes until in the 1230 he was among the largest Sienese taxpayers. Friendship with Pope Innocent IV led to the Bonsignori acting as his agents and bankers.

In 1255, after Bonifazio's death, Orlando formed a consortium called the Gran Tavola ("Great Table"), which soon became the most powerful bank in Europe. It became the exclusive banker for the deposits of the income of the Papal States and, under Pope Clement IV, the ecclesiastical tithes for the Holy Land. The Gran Tavola supported Charles of Anjou in his conquest of the Kingdom of Sicily, and benefited greatly from his victory over the Hohenstaufen.

Orlando Bonsignori died in 1273. After his death the Gran Tavola soon declined and eventually went bankrupt in the early 14th century.

== Sources ==
- Cassandro, M. (1987). "La banca senese nei secoli XIII e XIV". Banchieri e mercanti di Siena. Rome: De Luca.
