= Gran Tavola =

Former bank of the Republic of Sienna

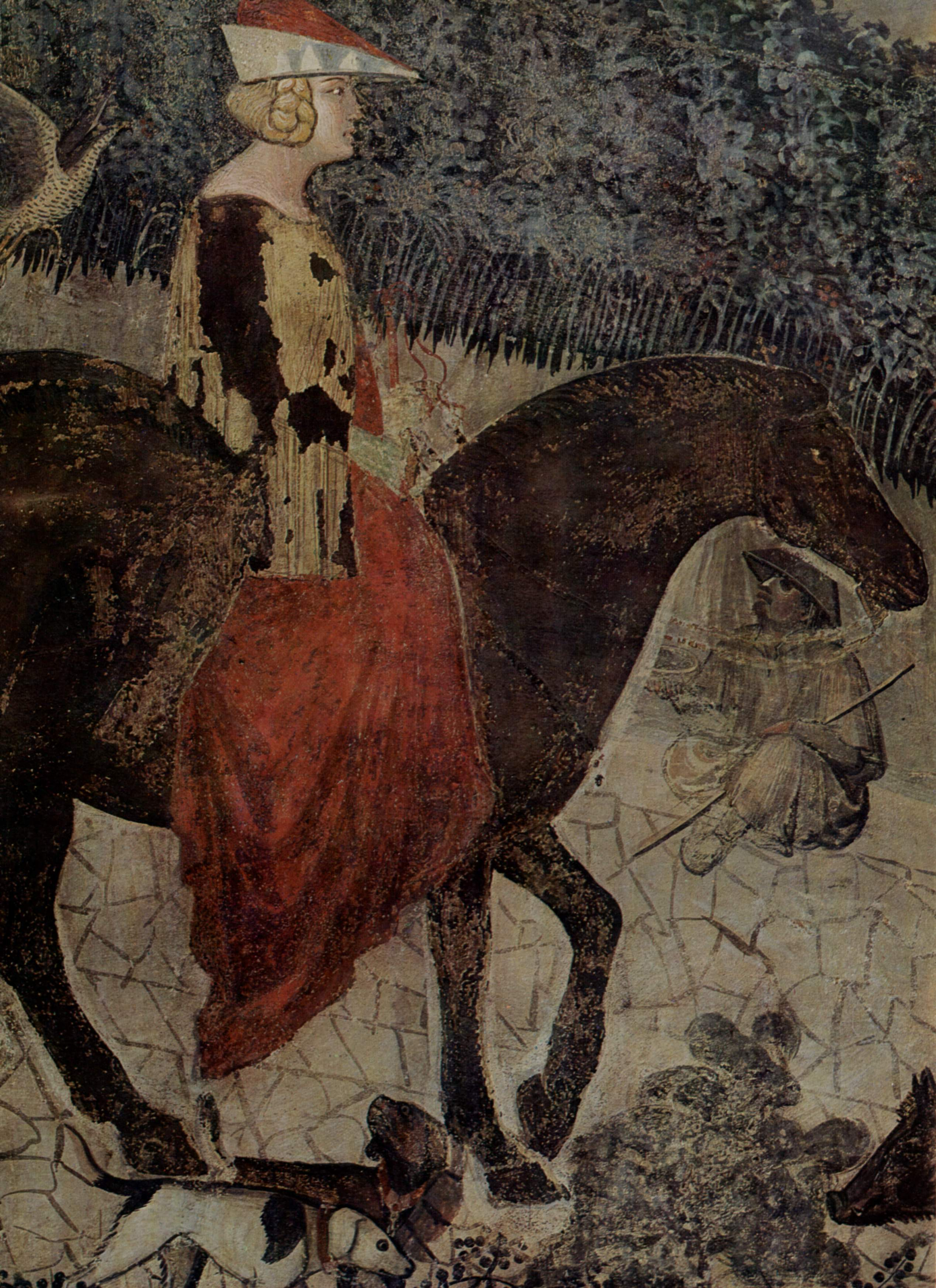
Orlando Bonsignori, the founder of the Gran Tavola

During the Middle Ages, the Gran Tavola (Italian for "Great Table") was the largest Sienese bank; it was one of the most powerful banks in Europe from 1255 to 1298. The Gran Tavola has been called "the greatest bank of the thirteenth century" as well as "one of the largest commercial and banking enterprises in Europe".

The main branches of the Gran Tavola during the mid-thirteenth century were in Pisa, Bologna, Genoa, Marseille, and Paris.

== Rise ==
The Gran Tavola has its roots in the societas of the Bonsignori, which began activity in the 1240s with the participation of the Malavolti family.

The Gran Tavola was founded by Orlando Bonsignori in 1255 and in the 1260s became the exclusive depository-general of the incomes of the Papal States. Pope Innocent IV's (1243–1254) conflicts with Frederick II, Holy Roman Emperor had demonstrated plainly to the Roman Curia the importance of reliable and robust financial services relationships. The first so-designated papal depository was the Piccolomini firm headed by Angeliero Solafico circa 1233 under Pope Gregory IX; the Gran Tavola filled this role between 1250 and 1270.

The slightly larger Ricciardi bank of Lucca was also intimately involved in church finances. During the reign of Pope Clement IV, the bank became responsible for the collection of all the ecclesiastical tithes for the Holy Land. Under Pope Urban IV (1265–1268), all pontifical taxes were collected by the Gran Tavola. After the 1260s, popes Nicholas III, Honorius IV, and Nicholas IV continued to use Sienese banks for a small amount of transactions.

The bank also supported Charles of Anjou in his conquest of the Kingdom of Sicily; through a network of "virtual banking syndicates" the bank secured a loan of 200,000 livres tournois for the Angevin monarch. The Gran Tavola benefited greatly from Charles's victory over the House of Hohenstaufen, having previously seen its commercial opportunities limited by Siena's political support of the Hohenstaufen. The Gran Tavola was "at the center of financial operations in both Genoa and Tuscany"; Guglielmo Leccacorvo served as the bank's representative in Genoa. Bonsignori made his institution one of the most influential in Western Europe by expanding its reach into Catalonia, France, and England.

== Decline and failure ==
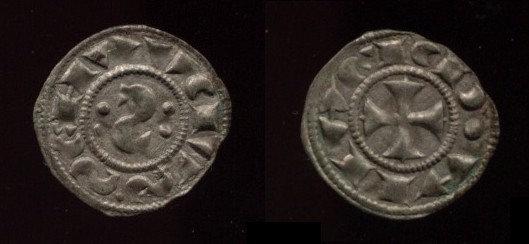
12th century Sienese coins

The bank declined after the death of Bonsignori in 1273, and went bankrupt in 1298. The formality of bankruptcy may not have occurred until several years after 1298. The coup de grâce for the Gran Tavola was the crunch caused by the confiscation of Sienese assets by Philip IV of France (as a result of debts he claimed to have been owed by the Bonsignori) and the loss of papal business under Pope Boniface VIII (a trend under way since the early 1290s).

The failure of the Gran Tavola was followed by a period of acute and sustained economic ruin in Siena, systemically spreading to several other Sienese banks. By 1320, Siena's international position had contracted almost entirely, following the additional failure of the Tolomei bank in 1313 and the decline of the Champagne fairs, whose commercial activities were "umbilically linked" to Siena; for example, Sienese institutions were not present in the Avignon Exchange created during the Avignon Papacy.

Pope Nicholas IV lost 80,000 florins as a result of the collapse of the Gran Tavola but the loss was mitigated by the overall weakening of Siena, at the time known for its anti-papal, though nominally Ghibelline, allegiances. Many years later, this loss served as one of the pretexts for the papal interdict of Siena. Furthermore, the failure of the Gran Tavola led to the rapid rise of Florentine banking institutions. Under the leadership of Pope Boniface VIII, the papal finances were transferred to Florentine banking institutions as well.

== See also ==
- Cahorsins
- Taula de canvi de Barcelona
- List of banks in Italy
