= Bardo (disambiguation) =

Bardo is a concept of a transitional state in Buddhism.

Bardo may also refer to:

== Arts and entertainment ==
- Bardo (2016 film), a short film
- Bardo (2021 film), a Marathi film
- Bardo, False Chronicle of a Handful of Truths, a 2022 Mexican drama film
- Bardo (band), a group that represented the United Kingdom in the Eurovision Song Contest in 1982
- Bardo (album), 1981 album by Peter Michael Hamel
- "Bardo Airways", a song by Nebula from the 2002 album Dos EPs
- "Bardo", an episode of the Indian TV series Sacred Games

== Places ==
- Le Bardo, a suburb of Tunis
  - Treaty of Bardo (1881), a treaty between France and Tunisia
  - Bardo National Museum (Tunis) of antiquities
  - Bardo Palace, site of both the museum and the Assembly of the Representatives of the People of Tunisia
- Bardo National Museum (Algiers), a national museum in Algeria
- Bardo, Alberta, a locale in Canada
- Bardo, Kentucky, a settlement in the US
- Bardo, Poland, a town in Lower Silesia
- Bardo, Świętokrzyskie Voivodeship (south-central Poland)
- Bardo, Greater Poland Voivodeship (west-central Poland)
- Bardu Municipality, a municipality in Troms county, Norway (historically spelled "Bardo")
- Bardo, Slovene name for Lusevera, a commune in Italy

== Other uses ==
- Bardo (surname) (including a list of people with the name)
- Bardo (bishop) (died 1051), Archbishop of Mainz
- Bardo (truck), a pick-up truck manufactured by Iran Khodro

== See also ==
- Bardo Thodol, a Tibetan funerary text
- Bardos (disambiguation)
- Bardot (disambiguation)
- Bardon (disambiguation)
- Bardu (disambiguation)
