= Bardon =

Bardon may refer to:

== Places ==
=== Australia ===
- Bardon, Queensland, suburb of Brisbane

=== England ===
- Bardon Mill, village in Northumberland
- In Leicestershire:
  - Bardon, Leicestershire, civil parish
  - Bardon Hill, highest point in Leicestershire

== People ==
- Álvaro Bardón, Chilean politician
- Anthony Bardon, Gibraltarian footballer
- Caitano Bardón, Leonese language writer
- Cédric Bardon, French footballer
- Franz Bardon, Czech occultist
- Geoffrey Bardon, Australian populariser of Western Desert aboriginal "dot art"
- Jeb Bardon, American politician
- John Bardon, actor who plays Jim Branning in EastEnders
- Jonathan Bardon, Irish historian and author

== Fictional characters ==
- Bardon, in Donita K. Paul's Dragonkeeper Chronicles
