= Rembów, Świętokrzyskie Voivodeship =

Rembów
- Village
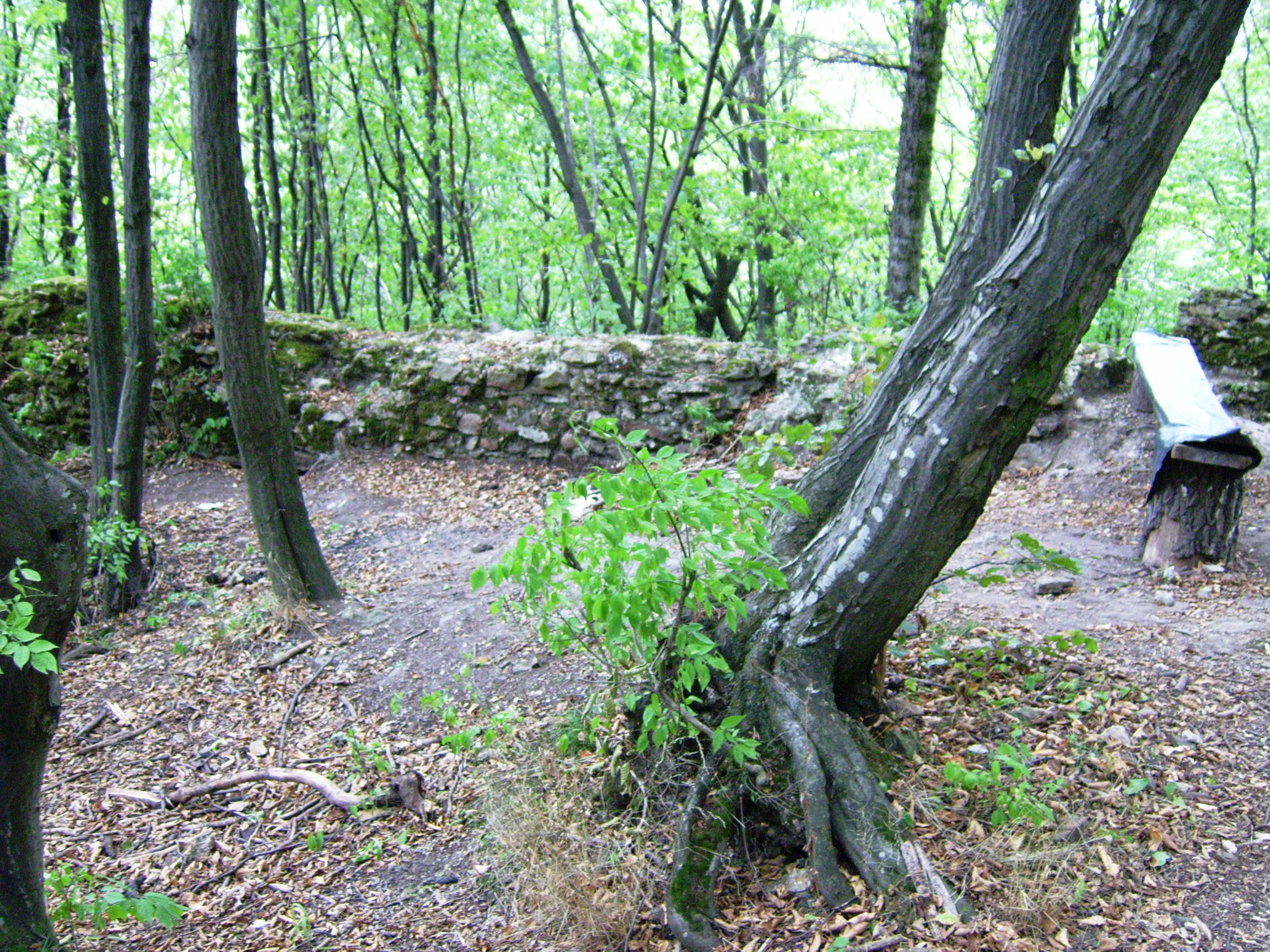
- Castle ruins

- Location within Poland
- Coordinates: 50°42′N 21°2′E
- Country: Poland
- Voivodeship: Świętokrzyskie
- County: Kielce
- Gmina: Raków
- Population: 330

Rembów [ˈrɛmbuf] is a village in the administrative district of Gmina Raków, within Kielce County, Świętokrzyskie Voivodeship, in south-central Poland. It lies approximately 4 km (2 mi) north of Raków and 36 km (22 mi) south-east of the regional capital Kielce.
