= Rakówka =

Rakówka may refer to the following places:

- Rakówka, Greater Poland Voivodeship (west-central Poland)
- Rakówka, Lublin Voivodeship (east Poland)
- Rakówka, Świętokrzyskie Voivodeship (south-central Poland)
