= Initiation Into Hermetics =

1956 book by Franz Bardon

- Initiation Into Hermetics
- Author: Franz Bardon
- Original title: Der Weg zum Wahren Adepten
- Translator: Gerhard Hanswille; Franca Gallo
- Language: English
- Subject: Magic
- Genre: Hermeticism
- Publisher: Merkur Publishing Company
- Publication date: 1956 (published by Verlag Hermann Bauer)
- Publication place: Germany
- English publication date: 1962 (published by Osiris Verlag)
- Media type: Print (Paperback)
- Pages: 356 pages
- ISBN: 1-885928-12-2
- OCLC: 76518248
- Followed by: The Practice of Magical Evocation

Initiation into Hermetics is the title of the English translation of Franz Bardon's first of three volumes concerning self-realization in line with the Hermetic tradition.

== Publication ==
The book was first published in German in 1956 under the title Der Weg zum Wahren Adepten by publisher Verlag Hermann Bauer. The first English edition appeared in 1962, published by Osiris Verlag and translated by Alfred Radspieler. A second English translation was published in 1971 by Dieter Rüggeberg. The most recent translation is published by Merkur, the translators of which were: Gerhard Hanswille and Franca Gallo and edited by Ken Johnson.

== Structure ==
The book itself is divided into two sections: the theory section and the practical section.

The theory section outlines esoteric theory and Hermetic philosophy to help the student when following this course. Topics covered include the elements (fire, air, water and earth plus the fifth, ether), Karma (the law of cause and effect), occult anatomy, the physical, astral and mental planes and the matters of religion and god.

The practical section is divided into 10 steps. Each step contains physical, astral and mental exercises which the student must master to the degree laid out by Bardon before moving on to the next step. The three kinds of exercises within a step are to be practiced concurrently, the idea being that this will lead to a more balanced development.

== English Editions ==
- Brotherhood of Life Books ISBN 3-921338-01-8 Edition: Hardcover; November, 1987
- Brotherhood of Life Books ISBN 1-885928-06-8 Edition: Hardcover; August 1, 1999
- Merkur Publishing Company ISBN 1-885928-12-2 Edition: Paperback; March 1, 2001
- Merkur Publishing Company ISBN 978-1885928122 Edition: Paperback; March 6, 2015

== See also ==
- Hermetica – the historical writings attributed to Hermes Trismegistus
- The Kybalion – another modern Hermetic work, published in 1908
