= Pułaczów =

- Village
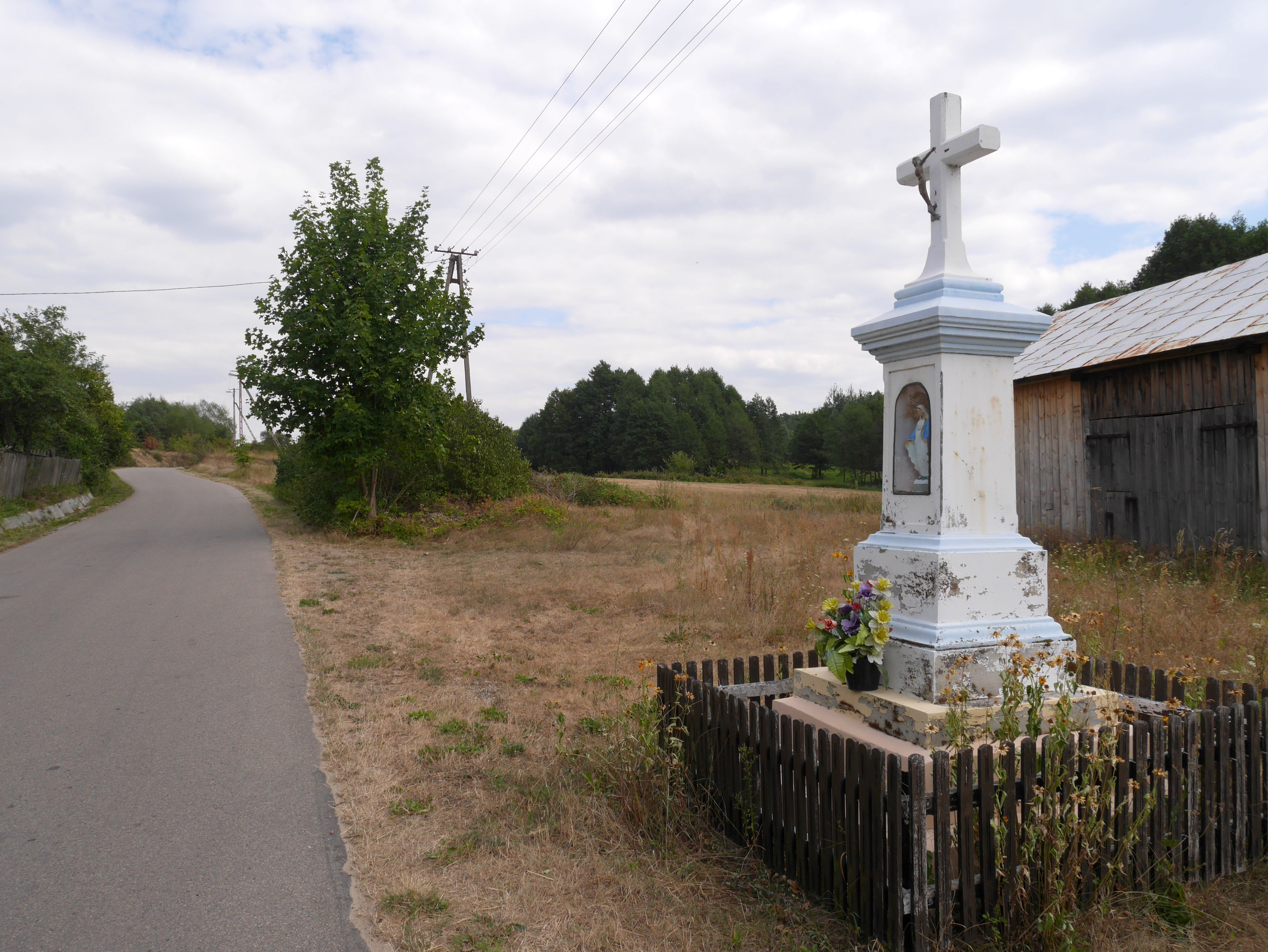
- Wayside cross

- Location within Poland
- Coordinates: 50°40′52″N 21°8′0″E
- Country: Poland
- Voivodeship: Świętokrzyskie
- County: Kielce
- Gmina: Raków
- Population: 79

Pułaczów [puˈwat͡ʂuf] is a village in the administrative district of Gmina Raków, within Kielce County, Świętokrzyskie Voivodeship, in south-central Poland. It lies approximately 7 km (4 mi) east of Raków and 43 km (27 mi) south-east of the regional capital Kielce.
