= Szumsko =

- Village
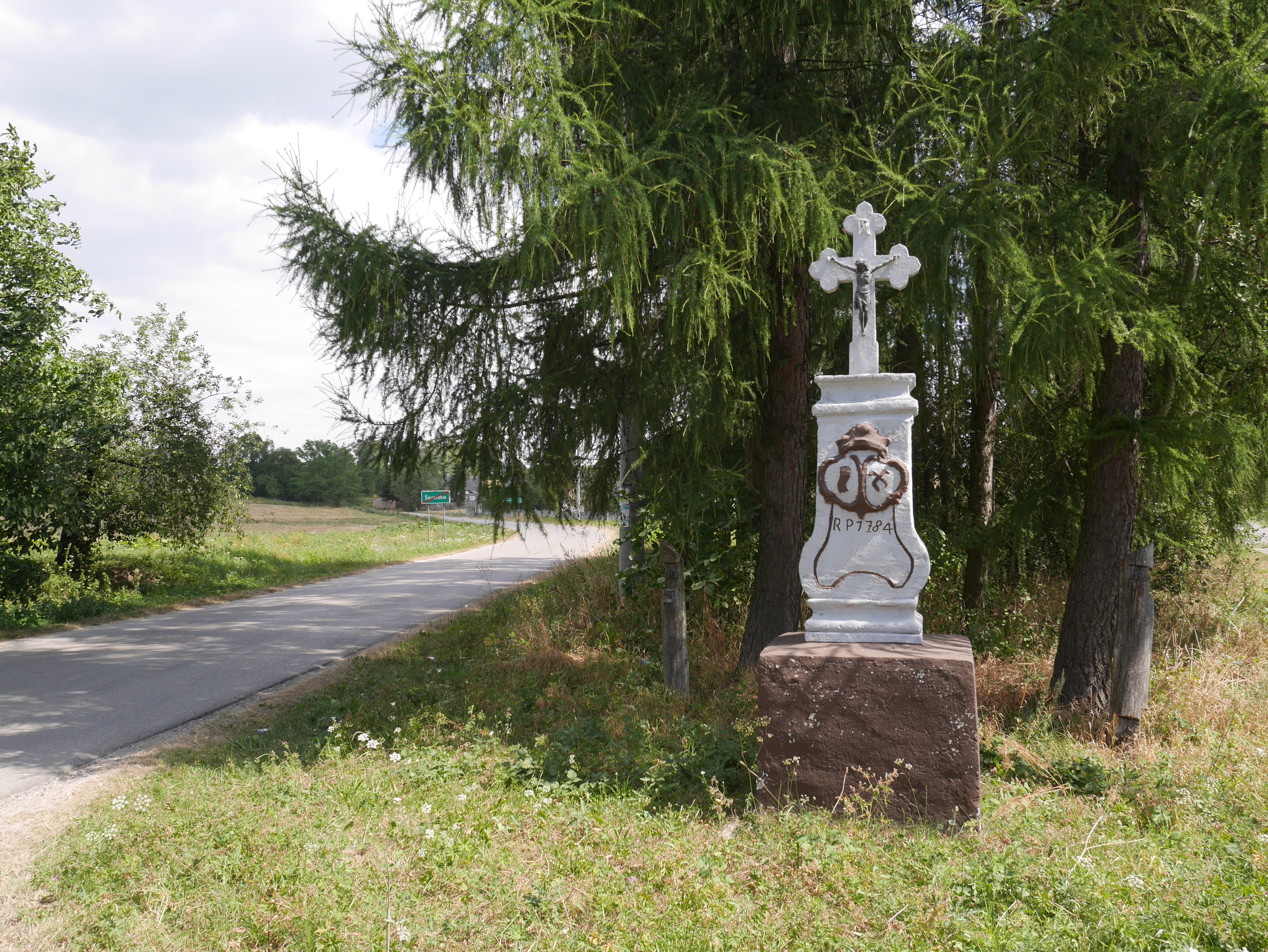
- Wayside cross

- Location within Poland
- Coordinates: 50°42′5″N 21°5′21″E
- Country: Poland
- Voivodeship: Świętokrzyskie
- County: Kielce
- Gmina: Raków

Population
  - Total: 263

Szumsko [ˈʂumskɔ] is a village in the administrative district of Gmina Raków, within Kielce County, Świętokrzyskie Voivodeship, in south-central Poland. It lies approximately 5 km (3 mi) north-east of Raków and 39 km (24 mi) south-east of the regional capital Kielce.

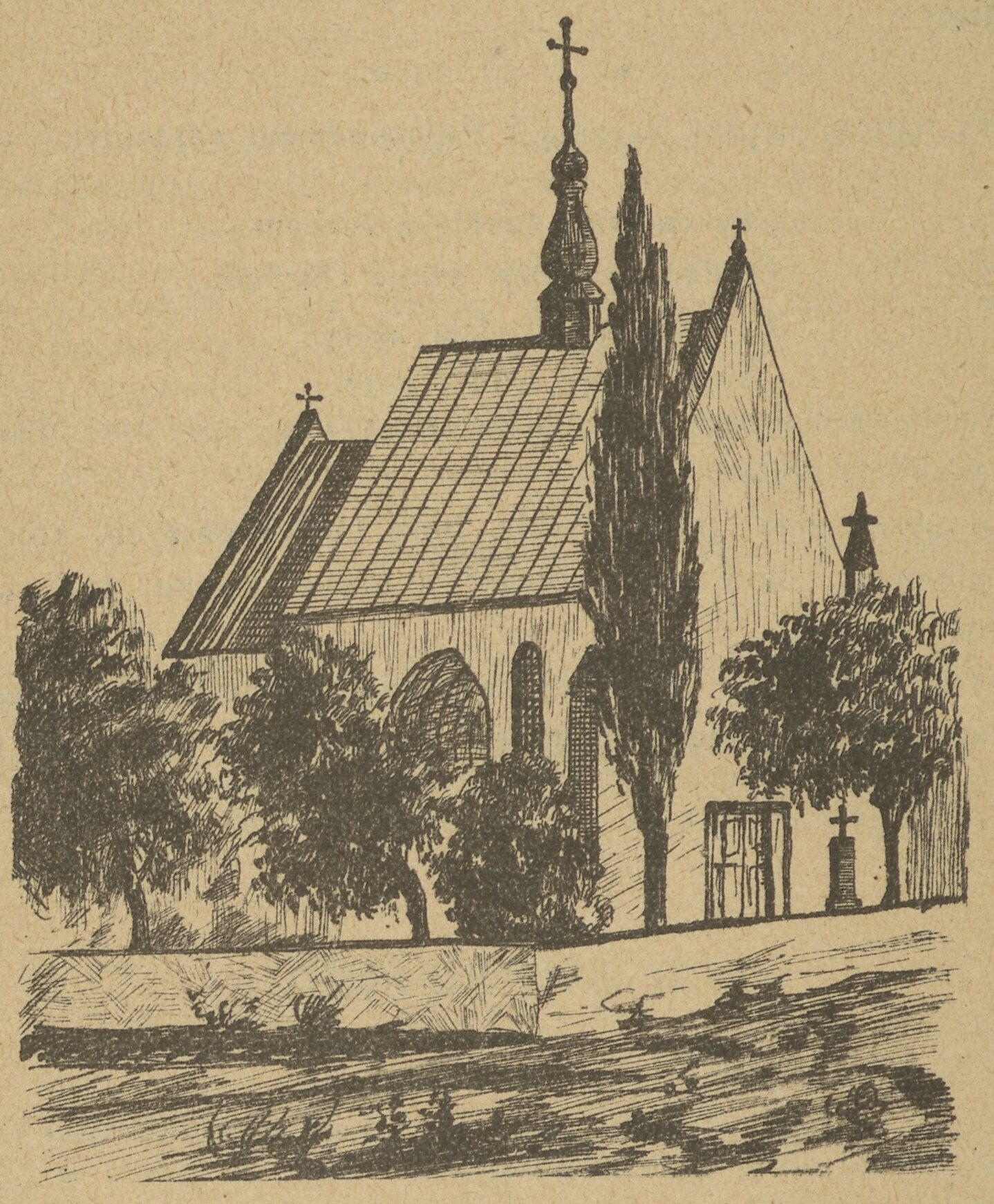
Church before 1907
