= Korzenno =

- Village
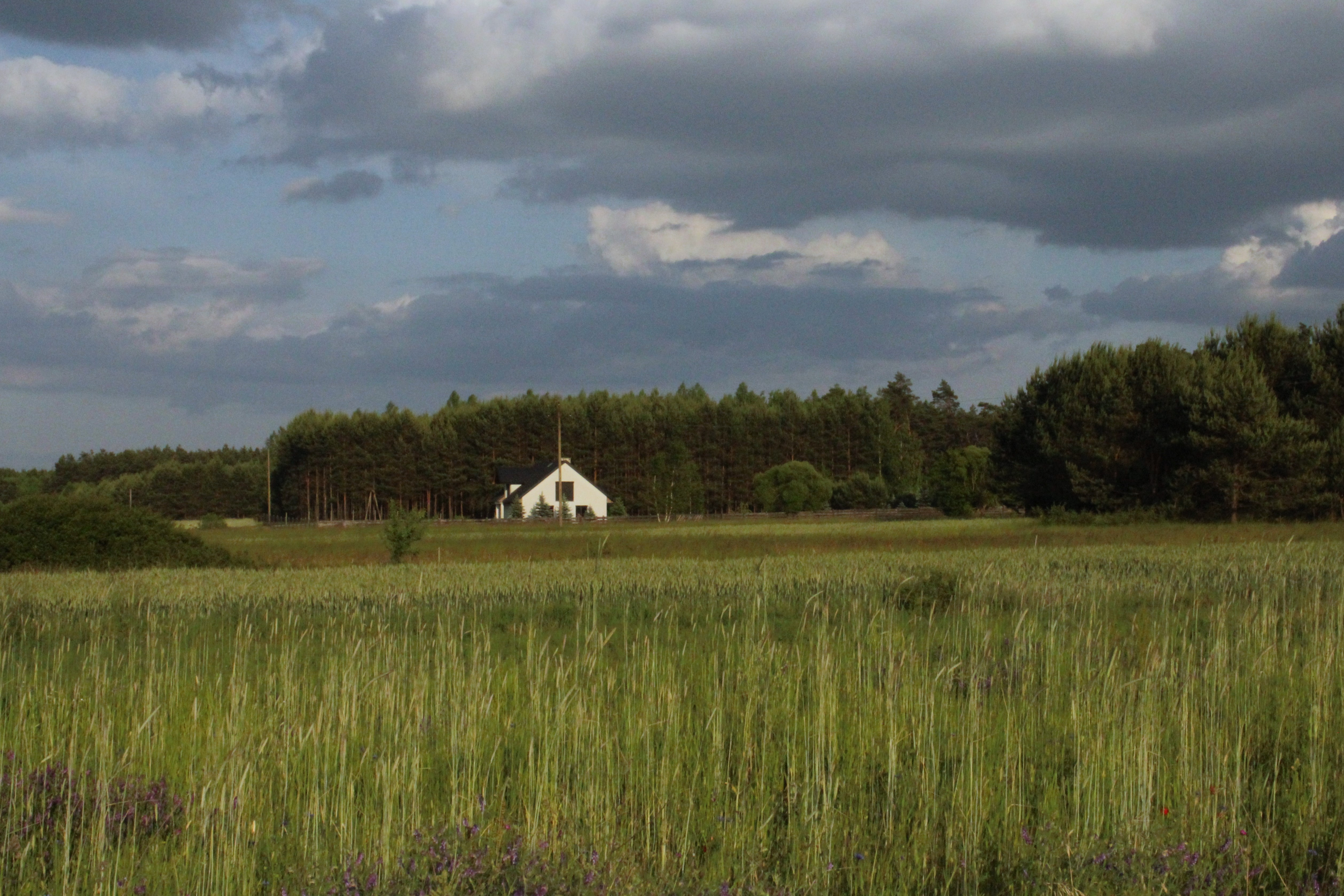

- Location within Poland
- Coordinates: 50°42′35″N 20°55′54″E
- Country: Poland
- Voivodeship: Świętokrzyskie
- County: Kielce
- Gmina: Raków
- Population: 116

Korzenno [kɔˈʐɛnnɔ] is a village in the administrative district of Gmina Raków, within Kielce County, Świętokrzyskie Voivodeship, in south-central Poland. It lies approximately 9 km (6 mi) north-west of Raków and 30 km (19 mi) south-east of the regional capital Kielce.
