= Lipiny, Świętokrzyskie Voivodeship =

Lipiny
- Village
- Location within Poland
- Coordinates: 50°41′49″N 21°3′42″E
- Country: Poland
- Voivodeship: Świętokrzyskie
- County: Kielce
- Gmina: Raków
- Population: 112

Lipiny [liˈpinɨ] is a village in the administrative district of Gmina Raków, within Kielce County, Świętokrzyskie Voivodeship, in south-central Poland. It lies approximately 3 km (2 mi) north-east of Raków and 38 km (24 mi) south-east of the regional capital Kielce.
