= Dębno, Gmina Raków =

Dębno
- Village
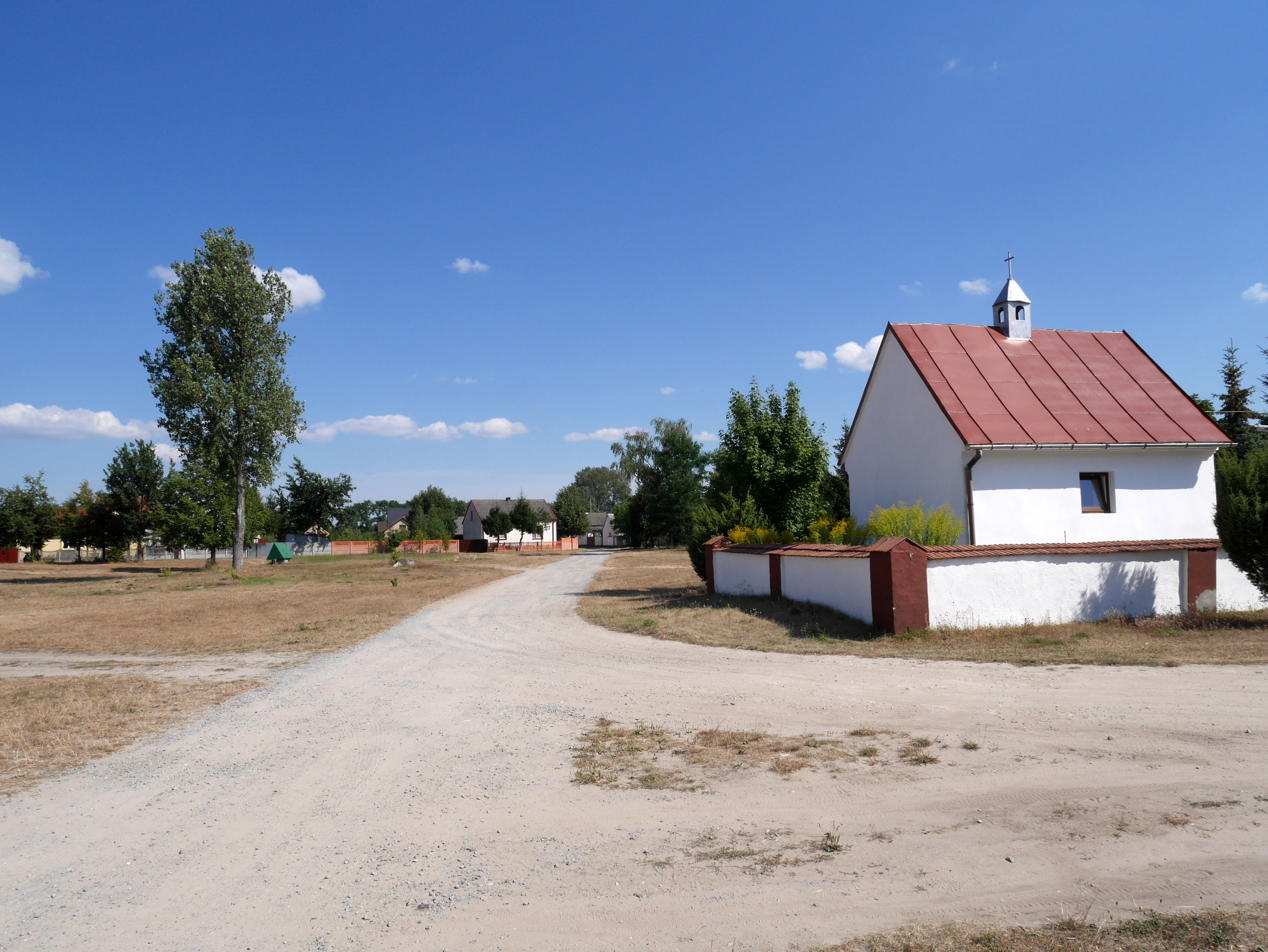

- Location within Poland
- Coordinates: 50°40′51″N 21°1′29″E
- Country: Poland
- Voivodeship: Świętokrzyskie
- County: Kielce
- Gmina: Raków
- Population: 80

Dębno [ˈdɛmbnɔ] is a village in the administrative district of Gmina Raków, within Kielce County, Świętokrzyskie Voivodeship, in south-central Poland. It lies approximately 2 km (1 mi) north-west of Raków and 37 km (23 mi) south-east of the regional capital Kielce.
