= Głuchów-Lasy =

- Village
- Location within Poland
- Coordinates: 50°40′30″N 20°55′35″E
- Country: Poland
- Voivodeship: Świętokrzyskie
- County: Kielce
- Gmina: Raków
- Population: 90

Głuchów-Lasy [ˈɡwuxuf ˈlasɨ] is a village in the administrative district of Gmina Raków, within Kielce County, Świętokrzyskie Voivodeship, in south-central Poland. It lies approximately 9 km (6 mi) west of Raków and 32 km (20 mi) south-east of the regional capital Kielce.
