= Stary Głuchów =

- Village
- Location within Poland
- Coordinates: 50°39′52″N 20°54′18″E
- Country: Poland
- Voivodeship: Świętokrzyskie
- County: Kielce
- Gmina: Raków
- Population: 153

Stary Głuchów [ˈstarɨ ˈɡwuxuf] is a village in the administrative district of Gmina Raków, within Kielce County, Świętokrzyskie Voivodeship, in south-central Poland. It lies approximately 10 km (6 mi) west of Raków and 32 km (20 mi) south-east of the regional capital Kielce.
