= Jamno, Świętokrzyskie Voivodeship =

Jamno
- Village
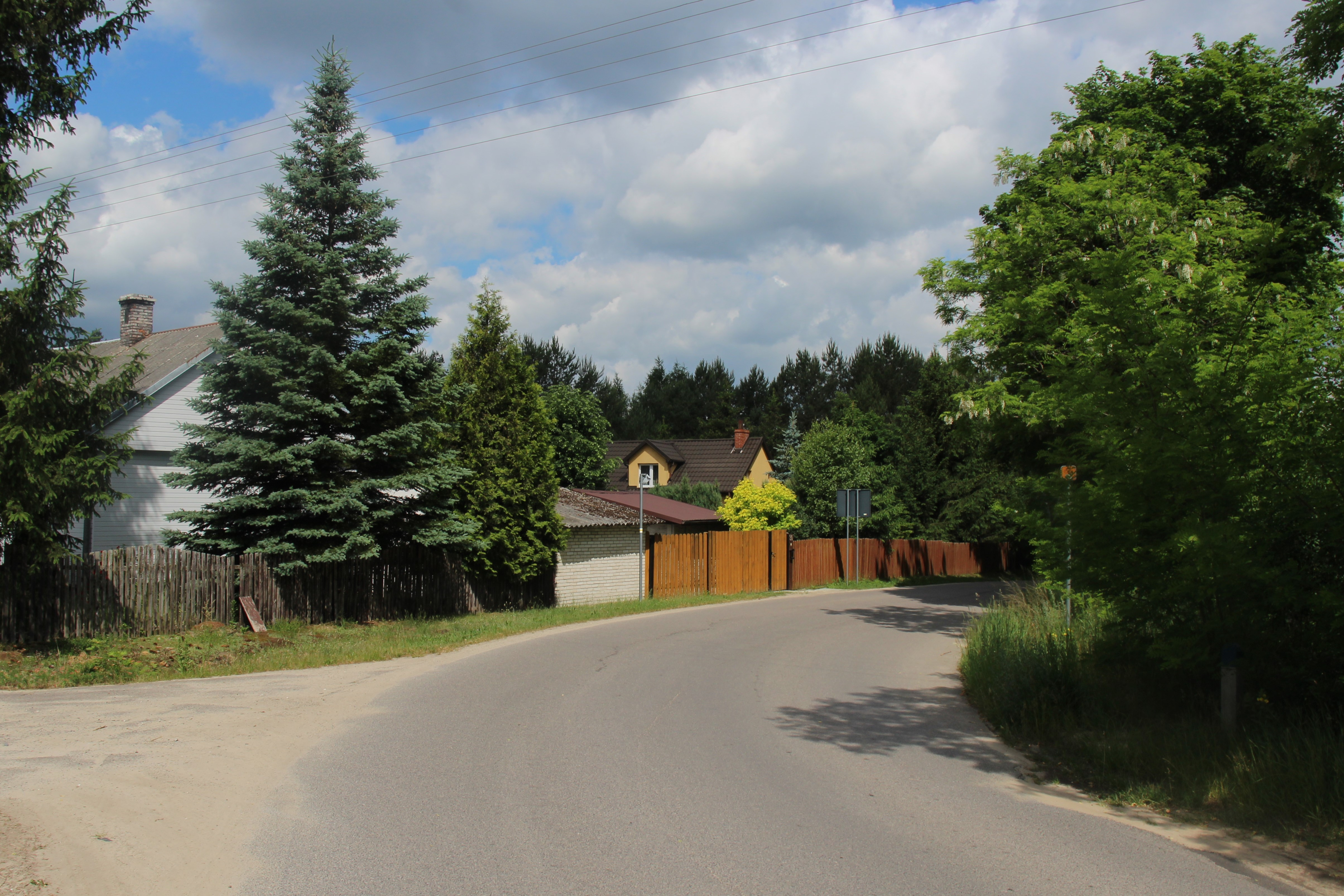

- Location within Poland
- Coordinates: 50°40′56″N 21°4′12″E
- Country: Poland
- Voivodeship: Świętokrzyskie
- County: Kielce
- Gmina: Raków
- Population: 86

Jamno [ˈjamnɔ] is a village in the administrative district of Gmina Raków, within Kielce County, Świętokrzyskie Voivodeship, in south-central Poland. It lies approximately 2 km (1 mi) north-east of Raków and 39 km (24 mi) south-east of the regional capital Kielce.
