= Drogowle =

- Village
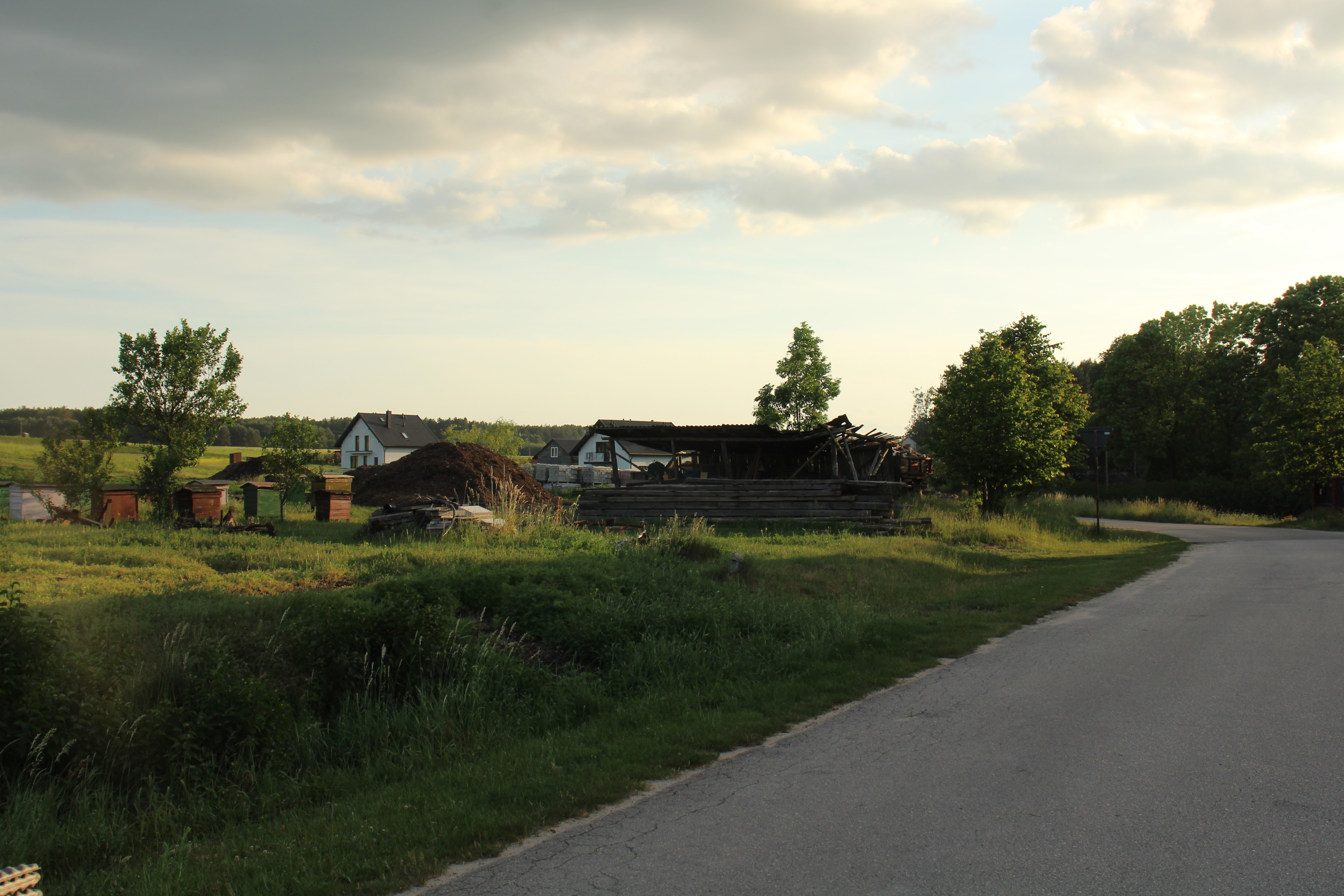

- Location within Poland
- Coordinates: 50°41′21″N 20°59′18″E
- Country: Poland
- Voivodeship: Świętokrzyskie
- County: Kielce
- Gmina: Raków
- Population: 136
- Website: http://drogowle.republika.pl

Drogowle [drɔˈɡɔvlɛ] is a village in the administrative district of Gmina Raków, within Kielce County, Świętokrzyskie Voivodeship, in south-central Poland. It lies approximately 5 km (3 mi) north-west of Raków and 34 km (21 mi) south-east of the regional capital Kielce.
