= Smyków, Gmina Raków =

Smyków
- Village
- Location within Poland
- Coordinates: 50°42′46″N 20°53′30″E
- Country: Poland
- Voivodeship: Świętokrzyskie
- County: Kielce
- Gmina: Raków
- Population: 38

Smyków [ˈsmɨkuf] is a village in the administrative district of Gmina Raków, within Kielce County, Świętokrzyskie Voivodeship, in south-central Poland. It lies approximately 12 km (7 mi) west of Raków and 28 km (17 mi) south-east of the regional capital Kielce.
