= Celiny, Gmina Raków =

Celiny
- Village
- Location within Poland
- Coordinates: 50°41′22″N 20°55′15″E
- Country: Poland
- Voivodeship: Świętokrzyskie
- County: Kielce
- Gmina: Raków
- Population: 66

Celiny [t͡sɛˈlinɨ] is a village in the administrative district of Gmina Raków, within Kielce County, Świętokrzyskie Voivodeship, in south-central Poland. It lies approximately 9 km (6 mi) west of Raków and 31 km (19 mi) south-east of the regional capital Kielce.
