= Koziel, Świętokrzyskie Voivodeship =

Koziel
- Village
- Location within Poland
- Coordinates: 50°45′10″N 20°57′20″E
- Country: Poland
- Voivodeship: Świętokrzyskie
- County: Kielce
- Gmina: Raków
- Population: 129

Koziel [ˈkɔʑɛl] is a village in the administrative district of Gmina Raków, within Kielce County, Świętokrzyskie Voivodeship, in south-central Poland. It lies approximately 11 km (7 mi) north-west of Raków and 28 km (17 mi) south-east of the regional capital Kielce.
