= Życiny =

- Village
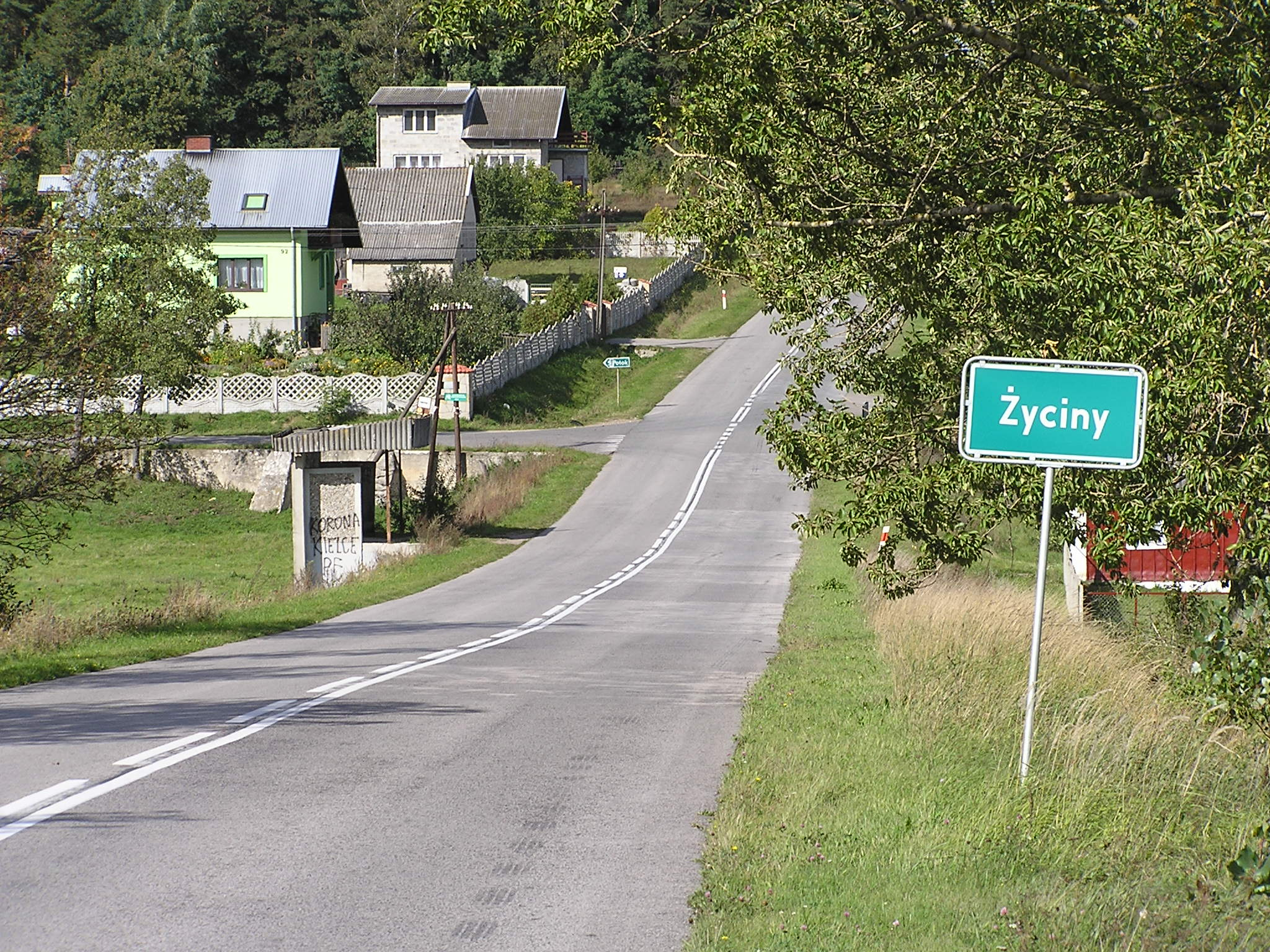

- Location within Poland
- Coordinates: 50°38′51″N 21°0′43″E
- Country: Poland
- Voivodeship: Świętokrzyskie
- County: Kielce
- Gmina: Raków
- Population: 317

Życiny [ʐɨˈt͡ɕinɨ] is a village in the administrative district of Gmina Raków, within Kielce County, Świętokrzyskie Voivodeship, in south-central Poland. It lies approximately 4 km (2 mi) south-west of Raków and 39 km (24 mi) south-east of the regional capital Kielce.
