= Zalesie, Kielce County =

Zalesie
- Village
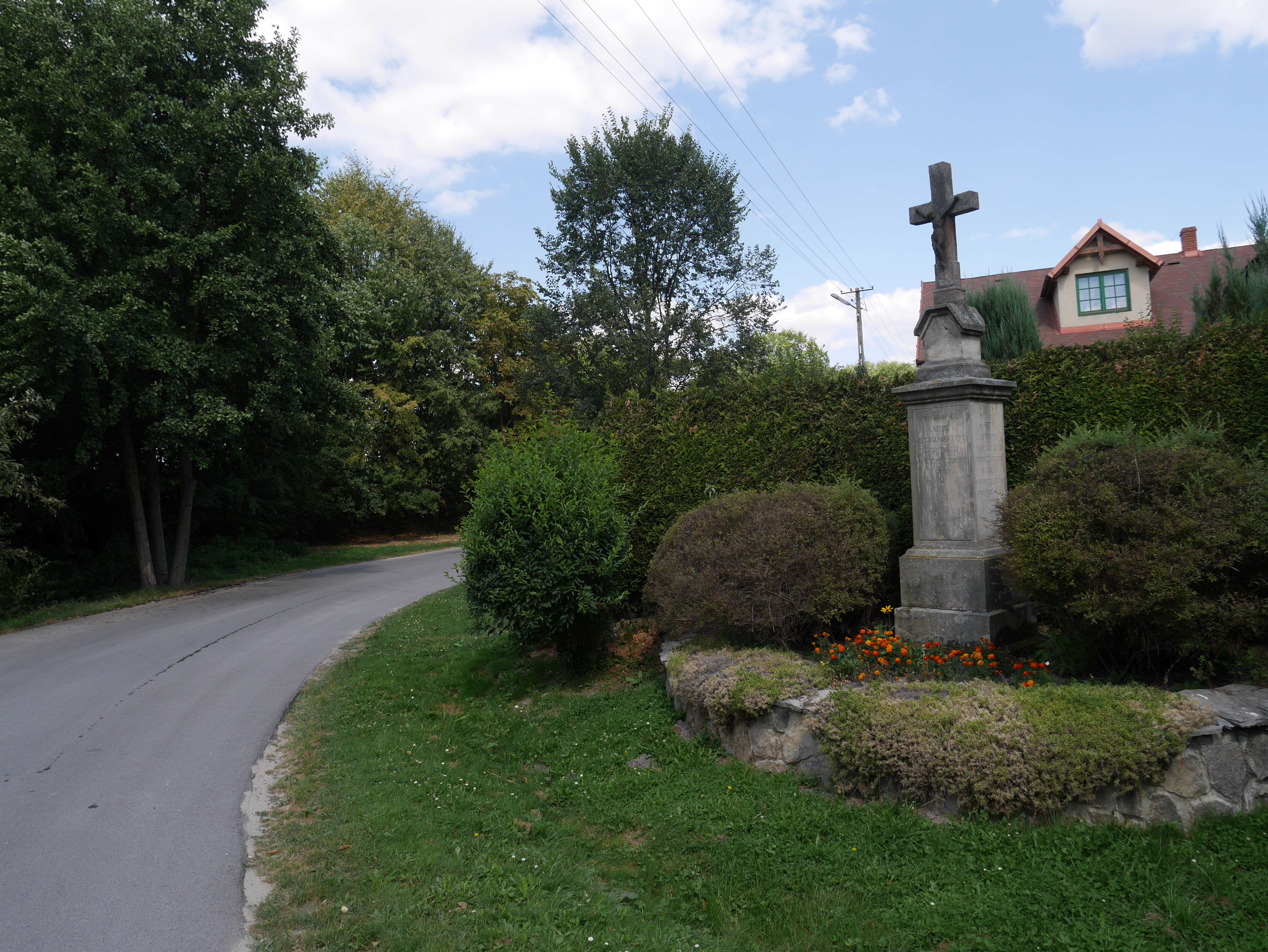

- Location within Poland
- Coordinates: 50°43′11″N 21°3′43″E
- Country: Poland
- Voivodeship: Świętokrzyskie
- County: Kielce
- Gmina: Raków
- Population: 355

Zalesie [zaˈlɛɕɛ] is a village in the administrative district of Gmina Raków, within Kielce County, Świętokrzyskie Voivodeship, in south-central Poland. It lies approximately 6 km (4 mi) north of Raków and 37 km (23 mi) south-east of the regional capital Kielce.
