= Szumsko-Kolonie =

- Village
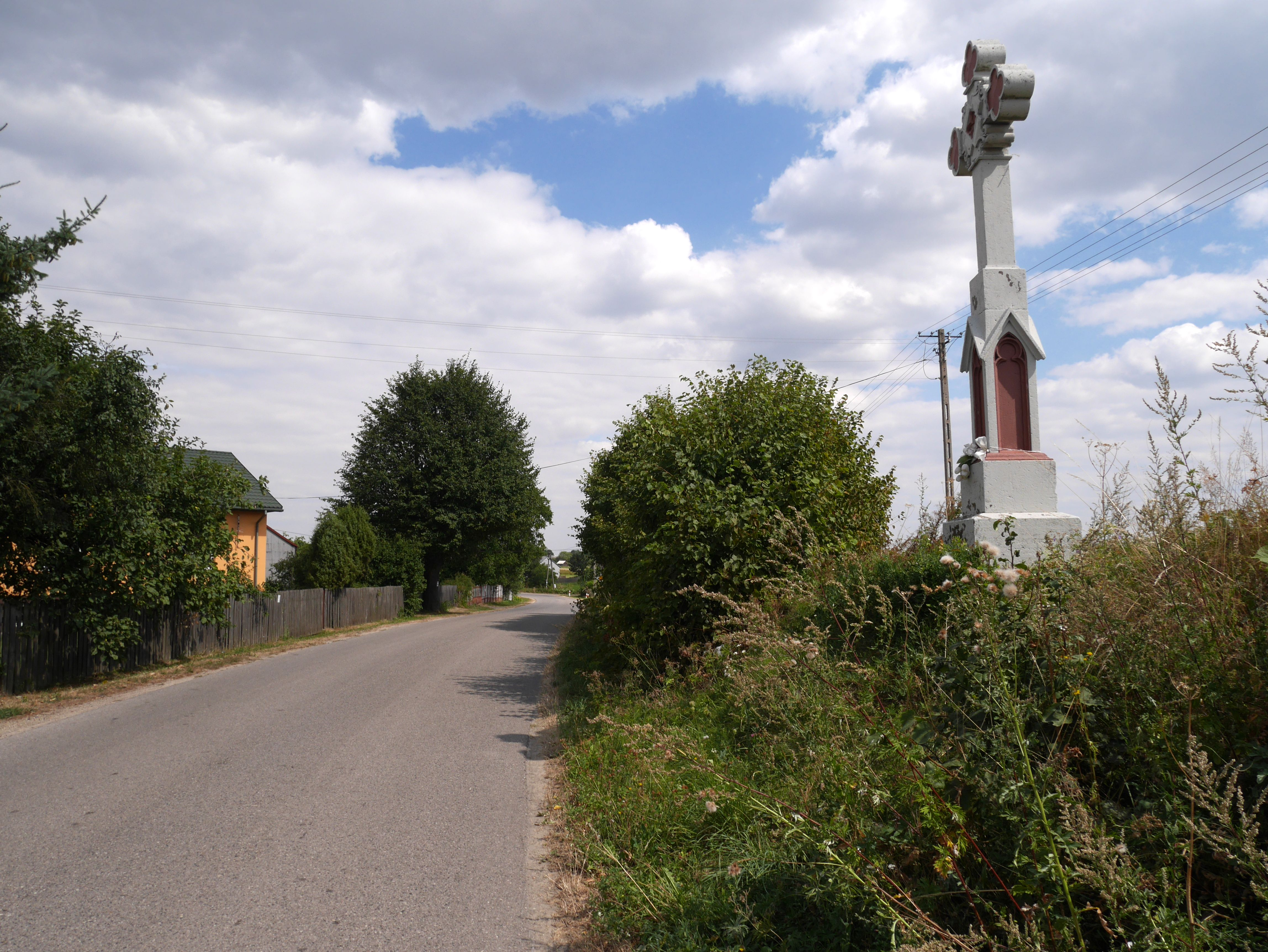
- Wayside cross

- Location within Poland
- Coordinates: 50°42′24″N 21°6′8″E
- Country: Poland
- Voivodeship: Świętokrzyskie
- County: Kielce
- Gmina: Raków
- Population: 187

Szumsko-Kolonie [ˈʂumskɔ kɔˈlɔɲɛ] is a village in the administrative district of Gmina Raków, within Kielce County, Świętokrzyskie Voivodeship, in south-central Poland. It lies approximately 6 km (4 mi) north-east of Raków and 40 km (25 mi) south-east of the regional capital Kielce.
