= Bardot =

Bardot (English: /bɑːrˈdoʊ/, French: [baʁdo]) may refer to:

== Music ==
- Bardot (English band), a British rock band active in the late 1970s
- Bardot (Australian band), an Australian female pop group, active from 1999 to 2002
  - Bardot (album), the self-titled debut album by Bardot

== People with the name ==
- Babette Bardot (born 1940), Swedish actress
- Bessie Bardot (born 1974), Australian model, writer and television presenter, born Bessie Wilson
- Brigitte Bardot (1934–2025), French actress, fashion model and animal activist
- Charles Bardot (1904–1973), French footballer
- Dino Bardot (born 1972), Scottish musician
- Mijanou Bardot (born 1938), French actress and writer, sister of Brigitte

== Other uses ==
- MV Brigitte Bardot, an Australian record-setting trimaran yacht
- Bardot (TV series), a 2023 drama television series
- Bardot (fashion label), Australian fashion brand

== See also ==
- Bardo (disambiguation)
- 17062 Bardot, an asteroid named after Brigitte Bardot
