= Chańcza, Świętokrzyskie Voivodeship =

Chańcza
- Village
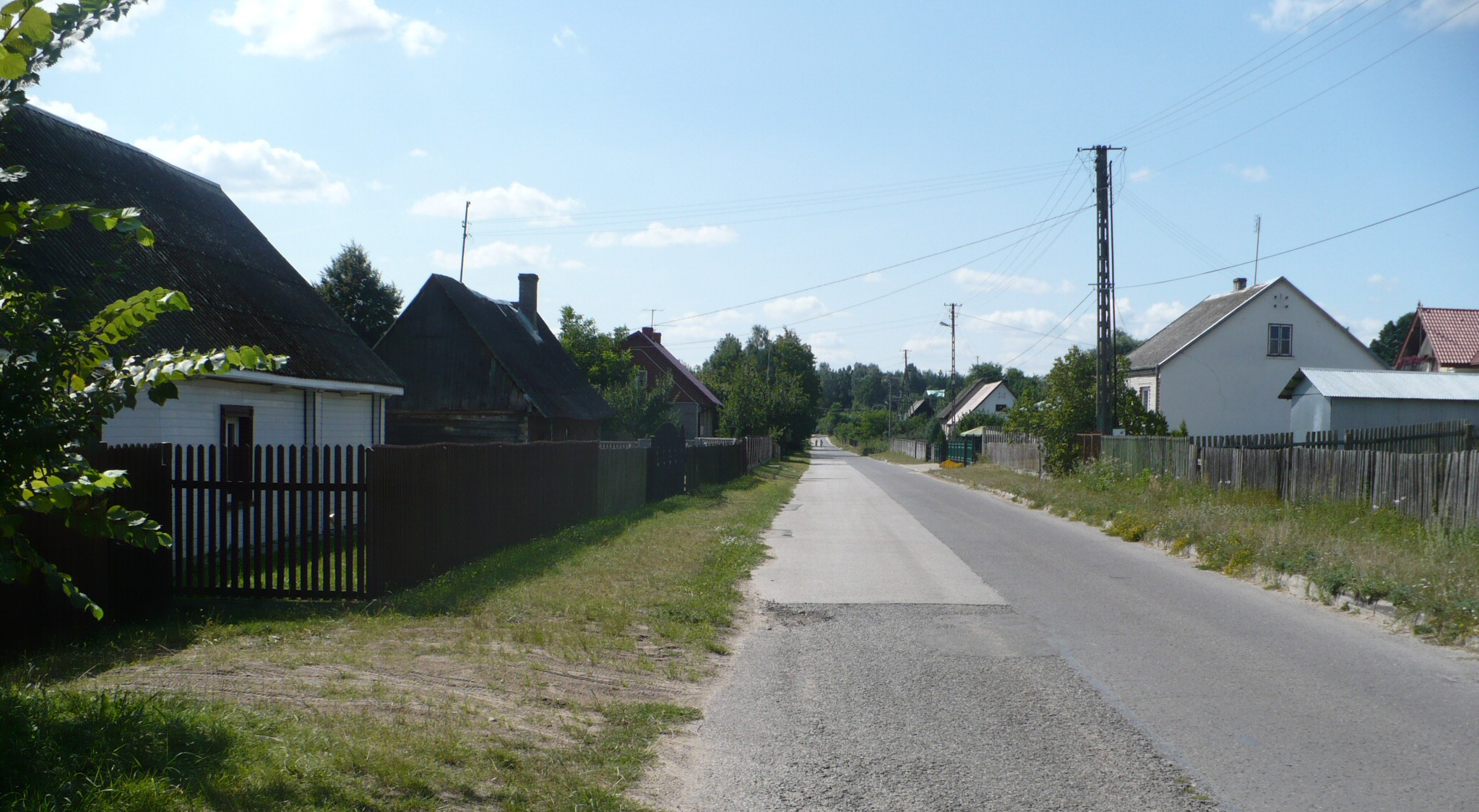
- A road through the village

- Location within Poland
- Coordinates: 50°38′45″N 21°4′19″E
- Country: Poland
- Voivodeship: Świętokrzyskie
- County: Kielce
- Gmina: Raków
- Population: 441

Chańcza [ˈxaɲt͡ʂa] is a village in the administrative district of Gmina Raków, within Kielce County, Świętokrzyskie Voivodeship, in south-central Poland. It lies approximately 4 km (2 mi) south-east of Raków and 42 km (26 mi) south-east of the regional capital Kielce.

Next to the village, there is Chańcza artificial lake.
