= Wola Wąkopna =

- Village
- Location within Poland
- Coordinates: 50°43′33″N 21°1′3″E
- Country: Poland
- Voivodeship: Świętokrzyskie
- County: Kielce
- Gmina: Raków
- Population: 120

Wola Wąkopna [ˈvɔla vɔŋˈkɔpna] is a village in the administrative district of Gmina Raków, within Kielce County, Świętokrzyskie Voivodeship, in south-central Poland. It lies approximately 7 km (4 mi) north of Raków and 34 km (21 mi) south-east of the regional capital Kielce.
