= Papiernia, Kielce County =

Papiernia
- Village
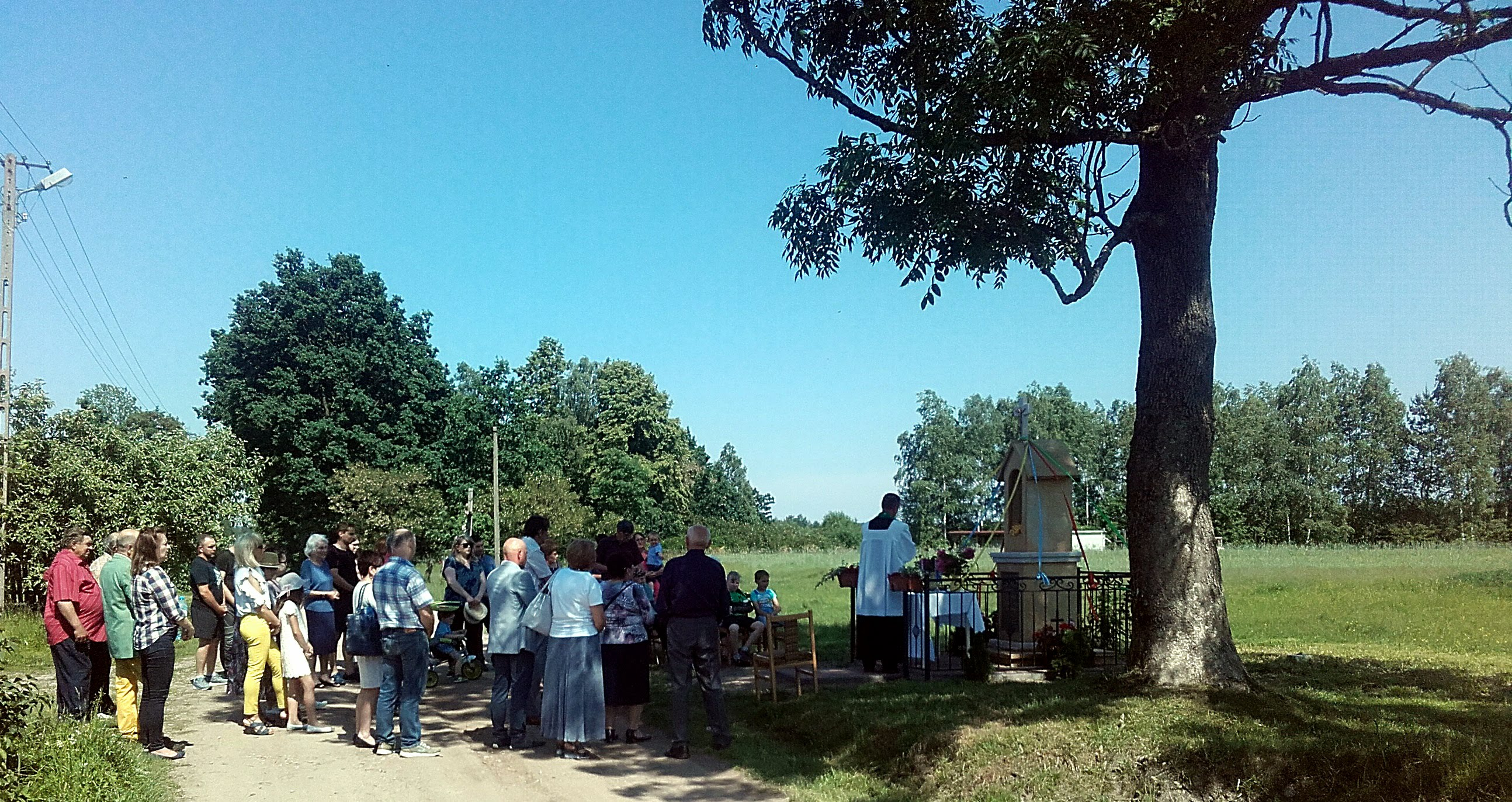
- Roadside shrine

- Location within Poland
- Coordinates: 50°41′48″N 20°52′44″E
- Country: Poland
- Voivodeship: Świętokrzyskie
- County: Kielce
- Gmina: Raków
- Population: 23

Papiernia [paˈpjɛrɲa] is a village in the administrative district of Gmina Raków, within Kielce County, Świętokrzyskie Voivodeship, in south-central Poland. It lies approximately 13 km (8 mi) west of Raków and 28 km (17 mi) south-east of the regional capital Kielce.
