= Wólka Pokłonna =

- Village
- Location within Poland
- Coordinates: 50°43′12″N 20°59′37″E
- Country: Poland
- Voivodeship: Świętokrzyskie
- County: Kielce
- Gmina: Raków
- Population: 258

Wólka Pokłonna [ˈvulka pɔˈkwɔnna] is a village in the administrative district of Gmina Raków, within Kielce County, Świętokrzyskie Voivodeship, in south-central Poland. It lies approximately 7 km (4 mi) north-west of Raków and 33 km (21 mi) south-east of the regional capital Kielce.
