= Bardu =

Bardu may refer to:

== People ==
- Bardu Ali (1906–1981), an American jazz and R&B singer, guitarist, and promoter

== Places ==
- Bardu Municipality, a municipality in Troms county, Norway
- Bardu Church, a church in Bardu Municipality in Troms county, Norway
- Bardu, Iran, a village in Karizan Rural District, Nasrabad District, Torbat-e Jam County, Razavi Khorasan Province, Iran
- Bardu, Kyrgyzstan, a village area in Kyrgyzstan
- Bardu Chaina, a village in Loharu Tehsil of Bhiwani district in Haryana, India

== See also ==
- Bardufoss, a town in Målselv Municipality in Troms county, Norway
- Bardu (card game)
- Bardo (disambiguation)
