= Mędrów =

- Village
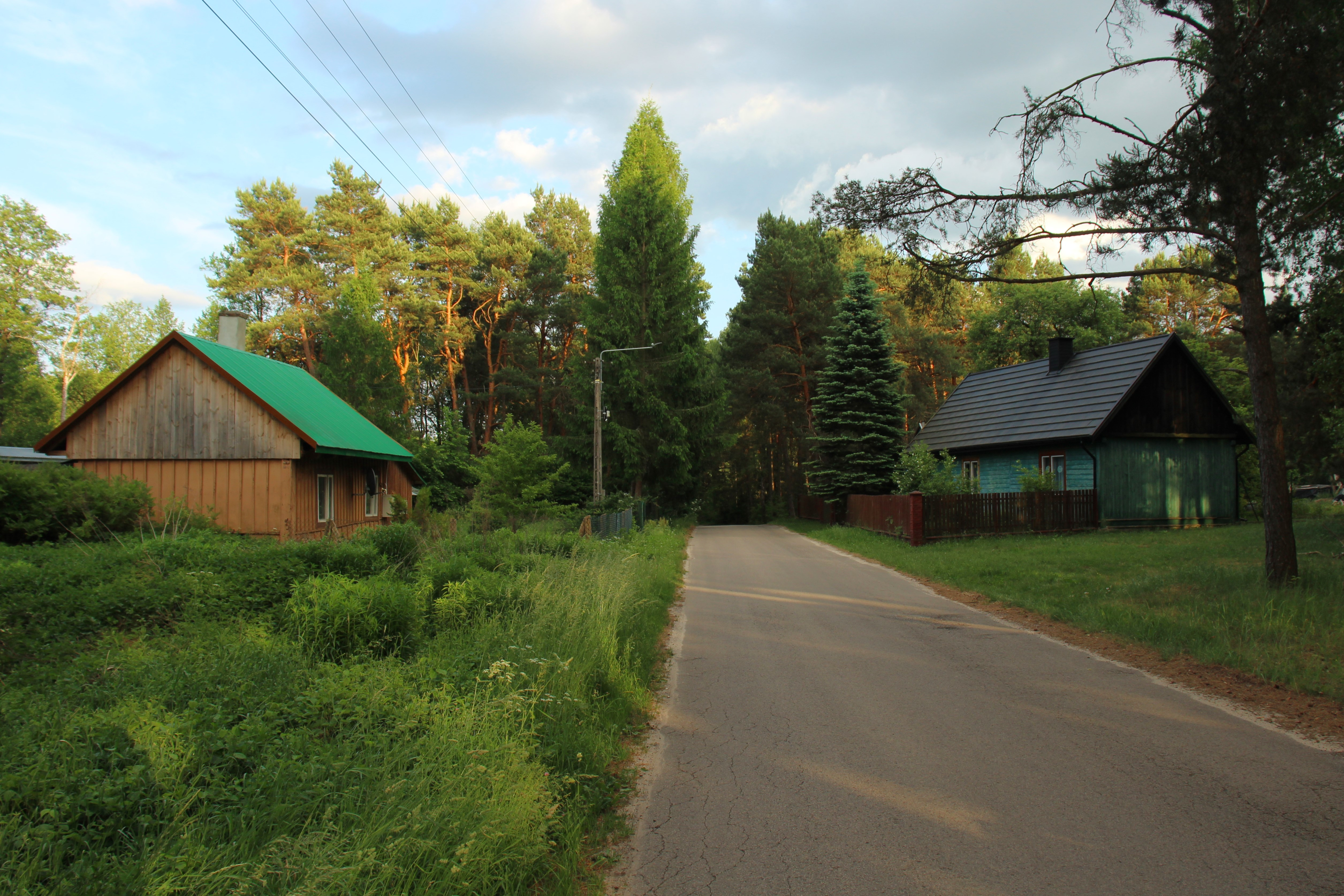

- Location within Poland
- Coordinates: 50°41′42″N 20°58′29″E
- Country: Poland
- Voivodeship: Świętokrzyskie
- County: Kielce
- Gmina: Raków
- Population: 121

Mędrów [ˈmɛndruf] is a village in the administrative district of Gmina Raków, within Kielce County, Świętokrzyskie Voivodeship, in south-central Poland. It lies approximately 6 km (4 mi) north-west of Raków and 33 km (21 mi) south-east of the regional capital Kielce.
