= Pągowiec, Świętokrzyskie Voivodeship =

Pągowiec
- Village
- Location within Poland
- Coordinates: 50°40′19″N 21°2′16″E
- Country: Poland
- Voivodeship: Świętokrzyskie
- County: Kielce
- Gmina: Raków
- Population: 78

Pągowiec [pɔŋˈɡɔvjɛt͡s] is a village in the administrative district of Gmina Raków, within Kielce County, Świętokrzyskie Voivodeship, in south-central Poland. It lies approximately 1 km (1 mi) west of Raków and 38 km (24 mi) south-east of the regional capital Kielce.
