= Nowa Huta, Gmina Raków =

Nowa Huta
- Village
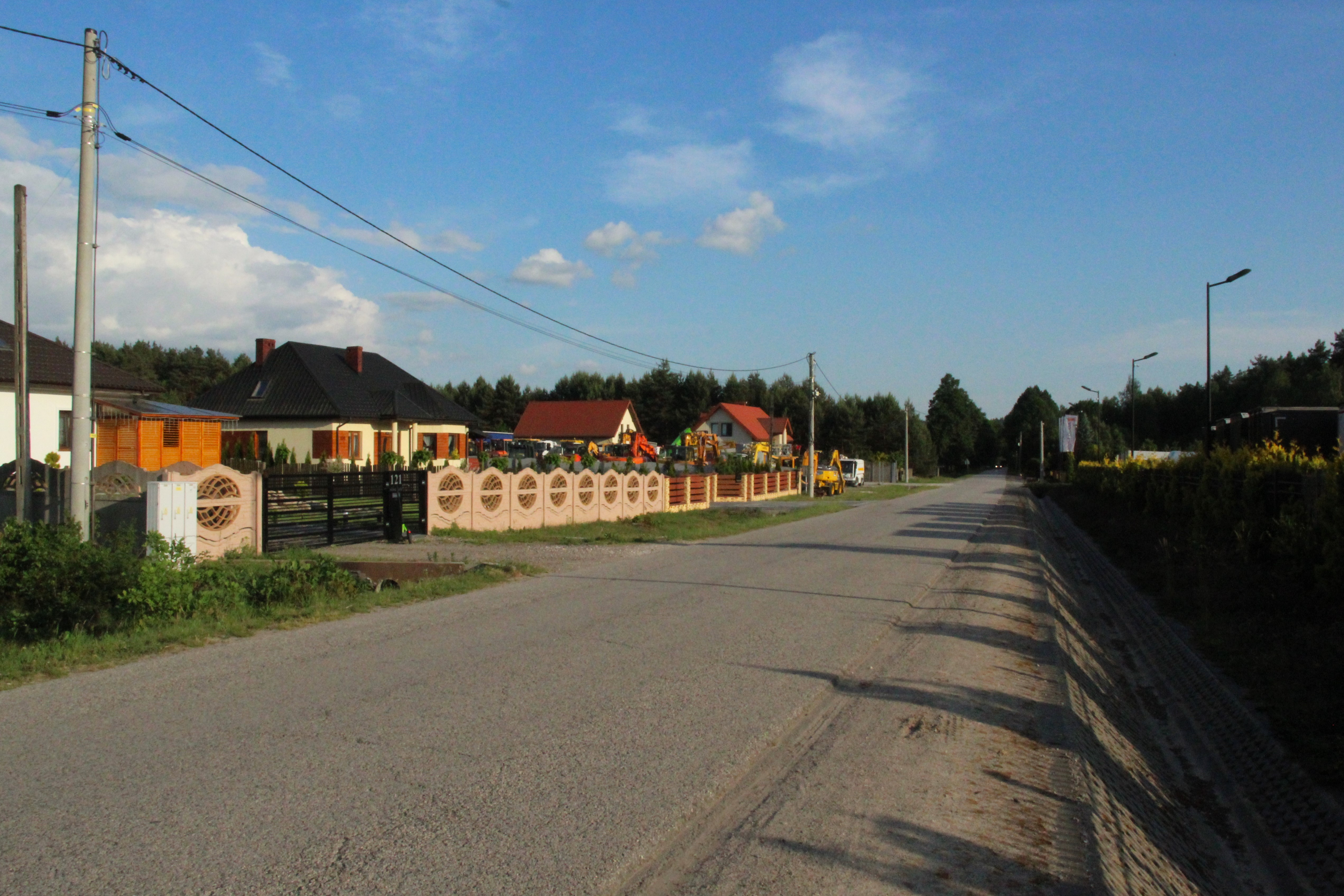

- Location within Poland
- Coordinates: 50°45′0″N 20°56′39″E
- Country: Poland
- Voivodeship: Świętokrzyskie
- County: Kielce
- Gmina: Raków
- Population: 306

Nowa Huta [ˈnɔva ˈxuta] is a village in the administrative district of Gmina Raków, within Kielce County, Świętokrzyskie Voivodeship, in south-central Poland. It lies approximately 12 km (7 mi) north-west of Raków and 28 km (17 mi) south-east of the regional capital Kielce.
