= Ociesęki =

- Village
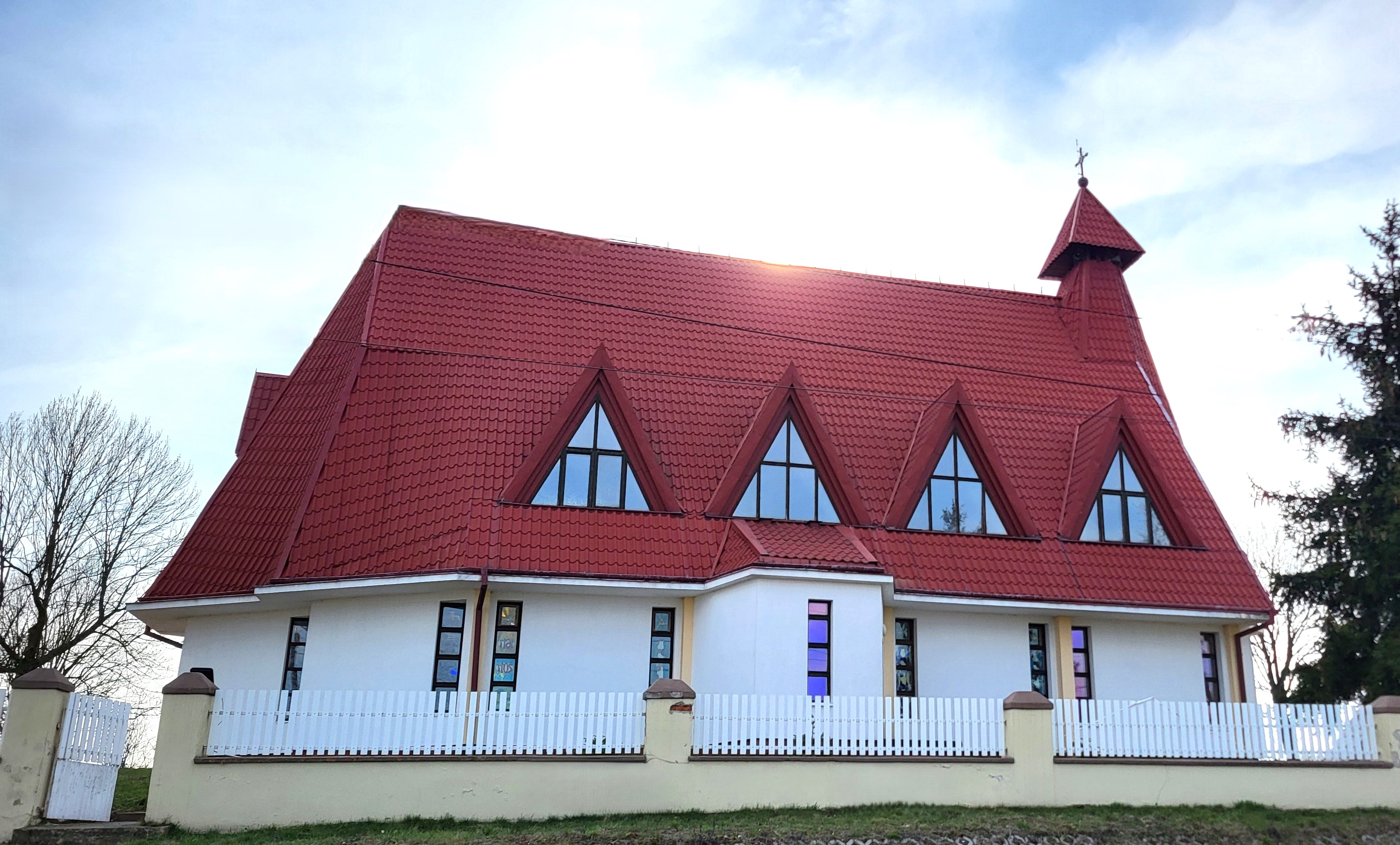
- Catholic church

- Location within Poland
- Coordinates: 50°44′9″N 20°58′37″E
- Country: Poland
- Voivodeship: Świętokrzyskie
- County: Kielce
- Gmina: Raków
- Population: 406

Ociesęki [ɔt͡ɕɛˈsɛŋki] is a village in the administrative district of Gmina Raków, within Kielce County, Świętokrzyskie Voivodeship, in south-central Poland. It lies approximately 9 km (6 mi) north-west of Raków and 31 km (19 mi) south-east of the regional capital Kielce.

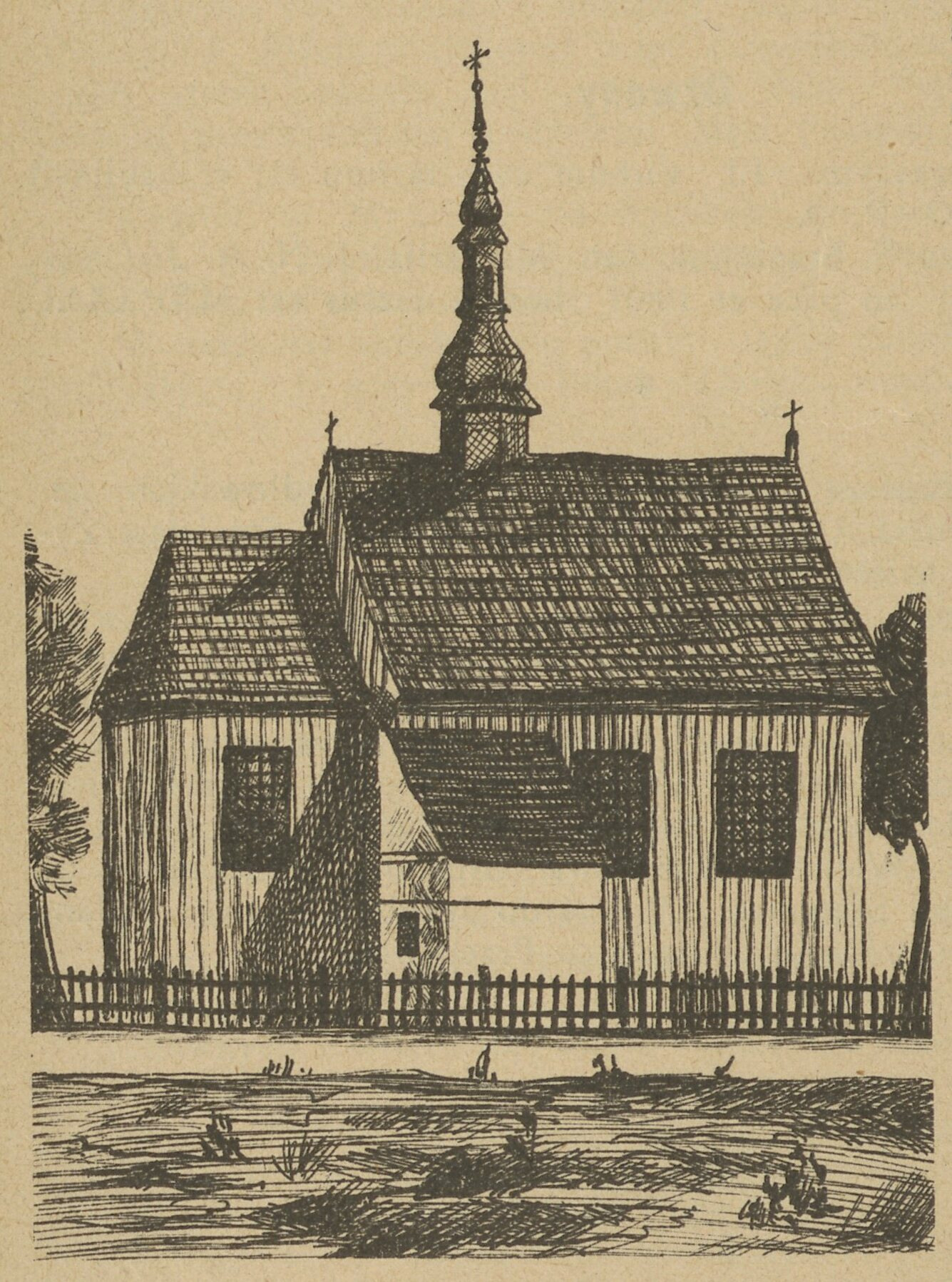
St John the Baptist church, before 1907
