= Radostów =

Radostów may refer to the following places:

- Radostów, Lublin Voivodeship (east Poland)
- Radostów, Świętokrzyskie Voivodeship (south-central Poland)
- Radostów, West Pomeranian Voivodeship (north-west Poland)
