= Gmina Raków =

Gmina Raków Raków Commune
- Gmina
- Coat of arms
- Interactive map of Gmina Raków
- Coordinates (Raków): 50°40′25″N 21°2′44″E
- Country: Poland
- Voivodeship: Świętokrzyskie
- County: Kielce County
- Seat: Raków

Area
  - Total: 191.09 km^{2} (73.78 sq mi)

Population (2006)
  - Total: 5,747
  - Density: 30.07/km^{2} (77.89/sq mi)
- Website: http://www.rakow.pl

Gmina Raków is a rural gmina (administrative district) in Kielce County, Świętokrzyskie Voivodeship, in south-central Poland. Its seat is the village of Raków, which lies approximately 39 kilometres (24 mi) south-east of the regional capital Kielce.

The gmina covers an area of 191.09 square kilometres (73.8 sq mi), and as of 2006 its total population is 5,747.

The gmina contains part of the protected area called Cisów-Orłowiny Landscape Park.

== Villages ==
Gmina Raków contains the villages and settlements of Bardo, Celiny, Chańcza, Dębno, Drogowle, Głuchów-Lasy, Jamno, Korzenno, Koziel, Lipiny, Mędrów, Nowa Huta, Ociesęki, Pągowiec, Papiernia, Pułaczów, Radostów, Raków, Rakówka, Rembów, Smyków, Stary Głuchów, Szumsko, Szumsko-Kolonie, Wola Wąkopna, Wólka Pokłonna, Zalesie and Życiny.

== Neighbouring gminas ==
Gmina Raków is bordered by the gminas of Bogoria, Daleszyce, Iwaniska, Łagów, Pierzchnica, Staszów and Szydłów.
