= Bardo, Świętokrzyskie Voivodeship =

Bardo
- Village
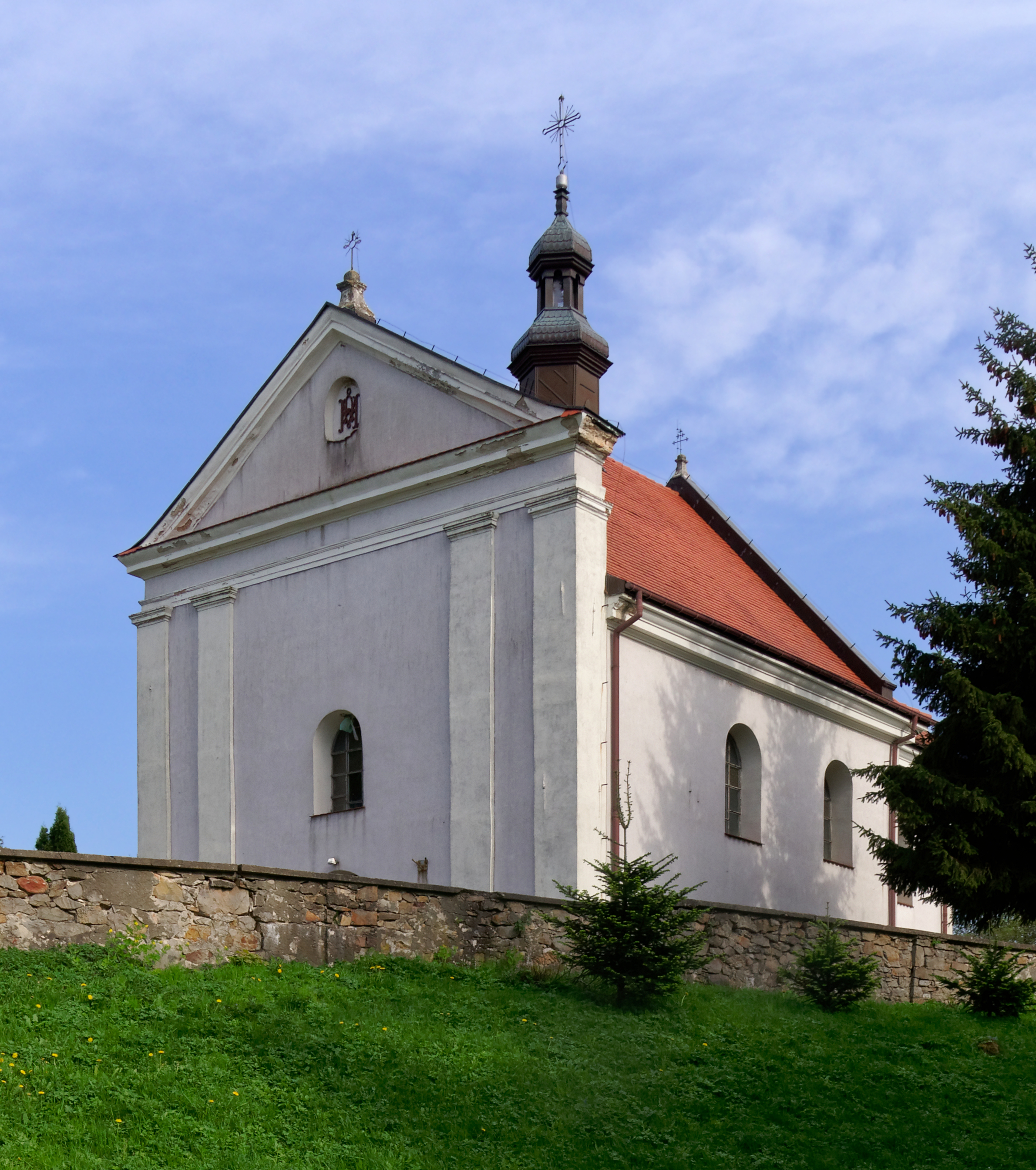
- Church of the Visitation in Bardo

- Location within Poland
- Coordinates: 50°44′8″N 21°2′36″E
- Country: Poland
- Voivodeship: Świętokrzyskie
- County: Kielce
- Gmina: Raków
- Population: 540
- Time zone: UTC+1 (CET)
  - Summer (DST): UTC+2 (CEST)
- Vehicle registration: TKI

Bardo [ˈbardɔ] is a village in the administrative district of Gmina Raków, within Kielce County, Świętokrzyskie Voivodeship, in south-central Poland. It lies approximately 7 km (4 mi) north of Raków and 35 km (22 mi) south-east of the regional capital Kielce.

== History ==
Bardo was a private village of Polish nobility, administratively located in the Wiślica County in the Sandomierz Voivodeship in the Lesser Poland Province of the Kingdom of Poland. A wooden church was built in Bardo in the 15th century, later replaced by the current brick church in the 18th century.

In 1827 it had a population of 211.

== Notable people ==
- Antoni Ksawery Sotkiewicz (1826–1901), Polish Catholic bishop
