= Rakówka, Świętokrzyskie Voivodeship =

Rakówka
- Village
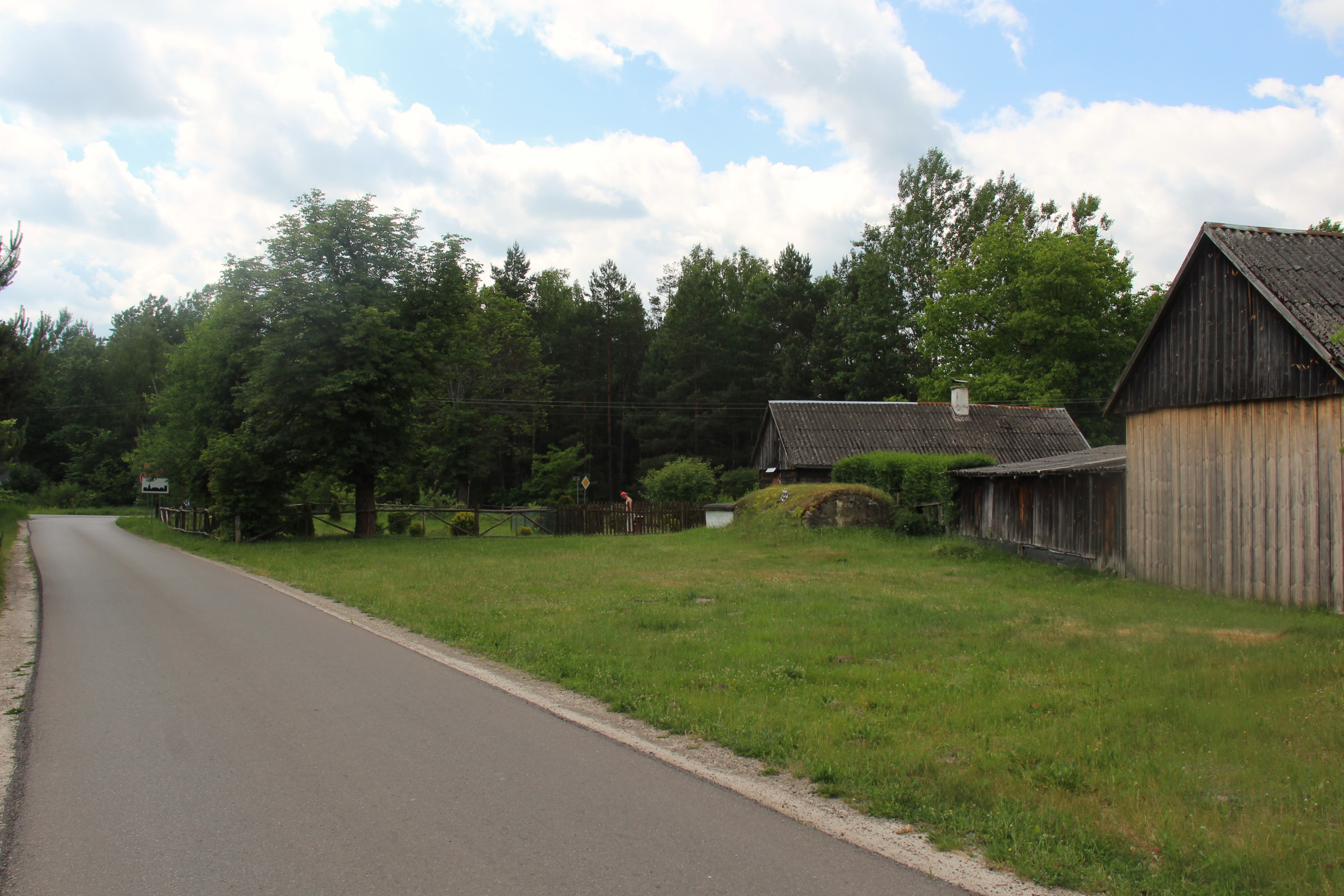

- Location within Poland
- Coordinates: 50°40′3″N 21°7′17″E
- Country: Poland
- Voivodeship: Świętokrzyskie
- County: Kielce
- Gmina: Raków
- Population: 132

Rakówka [raˈkufka] is a village in the administrative district of Gmina Raków, within Kielce County, Świętokrzyskie Voivodeship, in south-central Poland. It lies approximately 6 km (4 mi) east of Raków and 43 km (27 mi) south-east of the regional capital Kielce.
