= Radostów, Świętokrzyskie Voivodeship =

Radostów
- Village
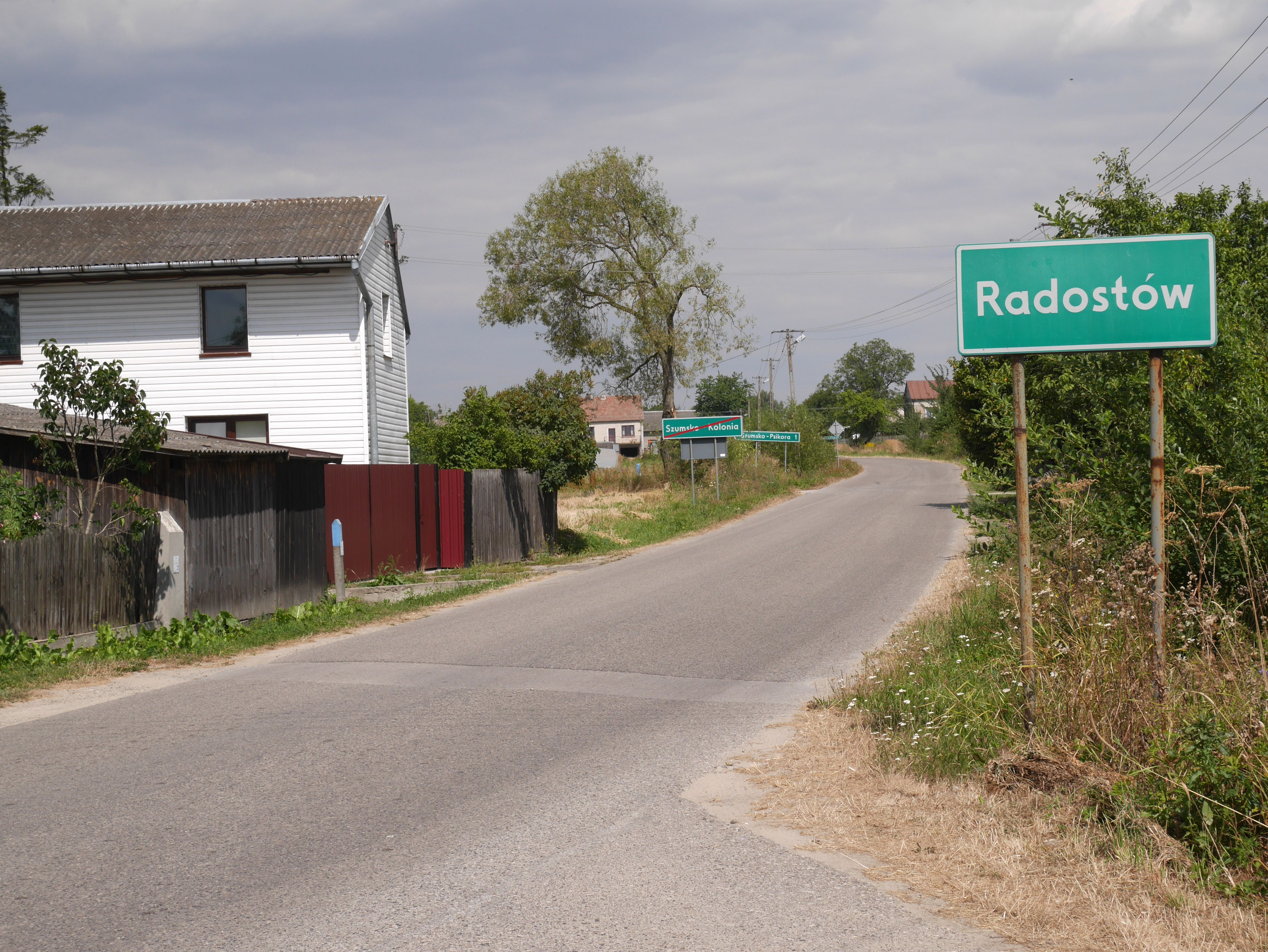

- Location within Poland
- Coordinates: 50°42′N 21°6′E
- Country: Poland
- Voivodeship: Świętokrzyskie
- County: Kielce
- Gmina: Raków
- Population: 183

Radostów [raˈdɔstuf] is a village in the administrative district of Gmina Raków, within Kielce County, Świętokrzyskie Voivodeship, in south-central Poland. It lies approximately 5 km (3 mi) north-east of Raków and 40 km (25 mi) south-east of the regional capital Kielce.
