= Bardos =

Bardos may refer to:

- the six bardos of Tibetan Buddhism
- Bardos, Pyrénées-Atlantiques, a commune in France
- Lajos Bárdos, composer and conductor
- Bardoș River, a river in Romania

== See also ==
- Bardo (disambiguation)
