= Warnia coat of arms =

Polish historical coat of arms

Warnia
- Battle cry: Borowa, Warnawa, Warnia
- Alternative names: Cancer, Rak, Warnawa, Warna
- Earliest mention: 1413
- Towns: none
- Families: 31 names altogether: Baraniec, Bądkowski, Bątkowski, Boszkowski, Brachowski, Burkat, Bużkiewicz, Czymbajewicz, Ćwirko, Damiecki, Gnoinicki, Gnoiński, Gnojnicki, Godycki, Lekczycki, Leksicki, Leksycki, Lekszycki, Łekszycki, Łększycki, Nosal, Nosala, Palewski, Płaza, Pstroski, Racki, Raczek, Rak, Rapacki, Turski, Zarzecki, Żołnierowski

Warnia is a Polish coat of arms. It was used by several szlachta families in the times of the Polish–Lithuanian Commonwealth.

== Notable bearers ==
Notable bearers of this coat of arms include:

- Jan Žižka z Trocnova a Kalicha (English: John Zizka of Trocnov and the Chalice; c. 1360 – 11 October 1424) was a Bohemian general.
- Ćwirko-Godycki Michał (1901–1980), Polish anthropologist. Professor at the Adam Mickiewicz University and the academy of physical education in Poznań. Author of many academic works.

== See also ==
- Polish heraldry
- Heraldry
- Coat of arms

== Bibliography ==
- Andrzej Kulikowski: Wielki herbarz rodów polskich. Warszawa: Świat Książki, 2005, s. 356. ISBN 83-7391-523-0.
