= Berdu =

Berdu بردو
- Village
- Location within Iran
- Coordinates: 35°26′57″N 60°07′37″E
- Country: Iran
- Province: Razavi Khorasan
- County: Torbat-e Jam
- Bakhsh: Nasrabad
- Rural District: Karizan

Population (2006)
  - Total: 525
- Time zone: UTC+3:30 (IRST)
  - Summer (DST): UTC+4:30 (IRDT)

Berdu (Persian: بردو, also Romanized as Berdū and Bardū) is a village in Karizan Rural District, Nasrabad District, Torbat-e Jam County, Razavi Khorasan Province, Iran. At the 2006 census, its population was 525, in 131 families.
