= Jeb Bardon =

American businessman and politician from Indiana

Member of the Indiana House of Representatives from the 25th district
- In office 1998 - 2012

Personal details
- Born: Indianapolis
- Party: Democratic
- Spouse: Kristie
- Education: Purdue University
- Occupation: Small business owner, politician

Jeb A. Bardon is an American businessman and politician from Indiana. Bardon currently serves as the Wayne Township trustee. Previously, Bardon was a Democratic member of the Indiana House of Representatives, representing the 25th District from 1998 to 2012.

Bardon began running to be the next Wayne Township trustee during fall 2021. Bardon won the 2022 Democratic primary election and is preparing for the general election on Tuesday, November 8, 2022.

After the resignation of Trustee Jones, Bardon was elected by Democratic caucus to fill the remainder of Jones' term (from July 2022 to January 2023). Most recently as trustee, Bardon has appointed a new fire chief, Marcus Reed, and expanded access to school uniform assistance.

In his free time, Bardon volunteers for organizations, including Reconnecting to Our Waterways – Little Eagle Creek and the International Marketplace Coalition.
