= Bardot (fashion label) =

Australian fashion label

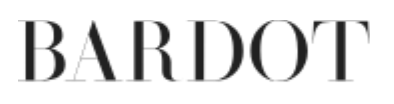
- Type: Private
- Industry: Apparel
- Founded: 1996
- Founder: Carol Skoufis
- Headquarters: Melbourne, Australia
- Area served: Worldwide
- Key people: Basil Artemides (CEO)
- Products: Clothing, accessories
- Number of employees: 30-50
- Website: www.bardot.com

Bardot (/bɑːrˈdoʊ/ bar-DOH) is an Australian fashion brand headquartered in Melbourne, Victoria. Founded by Carol Skoufis in 1996, the brand started as a brick and mortar store on Bridge Road in Melbourne. The brand now operates globally, predominantly, in Australia and the United States women's wear clothing market. In 2004, Bardot also launched a children's occasion wear clothing line called Bardot Junior.

Bardot designs the garments in-house in collaboration with local manufacturers and artisans, pattern-makers and machinists alongside Carol Skoufis as its creative director.

After voluntary administration and later re-purchase of the company by the brand's original founders, Bardot now operates as an entirely online retailer and wholesaler.

== History ==
Bardot has experienced significant changes amidst an uncertain time for the fashion industry. After 23 years as a major bricks-and-mortar retailer with 72 stores across Australia and employing about 800 staff, Bardot fell into voluntary administration in November 2019. However, following the brand's re-purchase by its original founder and co-founder – Carol Skoufis and Basil Artemides, Bardot has announced a relaunch as an entirely online retailer in 2020. This move was made to improve brand's online presence, expand its international wholesale business, reduce its operating costs and be free from the constraints of managing a large retail network.

The brand is now producing sustainable designs and adopting sustainable practices, such as using bio-based materials and recycling fabric.

== Operations ==
Internationally, Bardot operates a larger wholesale footprint than Australia, particularly in the US. The brand supplies to department stores such as Nordstroms, Bloomingdale's and Dillard's, and online retailer Revolve.

The brand is stocked in department stores across Canada, UK and European wholesalers such as ASOS and Next. Within Australia, the brand is stocked at multiple retailers including David Jones, Myer and The Iconic.
