= Donita K. Paul =

American novelist

- Born: November 20, 1950 (age 75); Lawrence, Kansas, U.S.
- Occupation: Christian author
- Writing career
- Period: 1999–present
- Genre: Christian fiction
- Notable work: DragonKeeper Chronicles

Donita Kathleen Paul (born November 20, 1950) is an American contemporary Christian fiction novelist. Best known for her fantasy DragonKeeper Chronicles series, she won a finalist medal in the Christy Awards for the first installment of the DragonKeeper Chronicles, DragonSpell. She has also written romances and juvenile novels under the name Kathleen Paul. Born in Lawrence, Kansas, Paul now lives in eastern Colorado.

== Biography ==
Paul studied elementary education in college as preparation for being a mother; she soon became a single mother and worked as an elementary-school teacher. It wasn't until flesh-eating bacteria in her leg put her in the hospital for 21 days that she seriously turned to writing at her mother's urging. She submitted a romance novel she had written for her thirteen-year-old daughter, and it was published.

=== Writing career ===
Paul began writing as a teen. She and three or four friends would write during the week and share their stories at a Friday night slumber party. She took the Institute of Children's Literature correspondence course when her children were preschoolers, and she later wrote a romance novel for her thirteen-year-old daughter, but she didn't settle down to writing until she got an infection in her leg that ultimately ended her school-teaching career.

After her initial success writing romances, Paul tried fantasy when her mother challenged her to write "something different, bigger, deeper". The eventual result was the DragonKeeper Chronicles.

== Bibliography ==
=== DragonKeeper Chronicles Series ===
| Title | Year | Summary |
|---|---|---|
| DragonSpell | 2004 | Former slave Kale Allerion unintentionally joins a band of adventurers on her way to train for royal service. Now she must help recover a dragon egg stolen by an evil, terrible wizard. |
| DragonQuest | 2005 | Now an apprentice dragonkeeper, Kale and a young man named Bardon must again thwart the evil wizard Risto's plans to use dragon-power for conquest. |
| DragonKnight | 2006 | Before becoming a knight, Bardon undertakes a quest to free magically imprisoned knights, one of whom may be Kale's long-lost father. Bardon and Kale also form a romantic relationship. |
| DragonFire | 2007 | Kale and Bardon, now husband and wife must stop husband-and-wife wizards devastating the land in a contest for supremacy. |
| DragonLight | 2008 | With the evil apparently banished from the land, a new religious movement arises—but is it a blessing or a curse? Also, waves of tiny but destructive dragons may herald the awakening of an ancient, unstoppable dragon. |

=== Chiril Chronicles Series ===
| Title | Year | Summary |
|---|---|---|
| Dragons of Chiril | 2009 | Tipper, a young emerlindian who's responsible for the upkeep of her family's estate during her sculptor father's absence, discovers that her actions have unbalanced the whole foundation of her world, and she must act quickly to undo the calamitous threat. With the help of some unlikely companions—including the nearly 5-foot-tall (1.5 m) parrot Beccaroon and the miraculous Wulder—she sets out to save her father and her world. Previously released as The Vanishing Sculptor |
| Dragons of the Valley | 2010 | With an invasion of her country imminent, Tipper Schope is drawn into a mission to keep three important statues from falling into the enemy's clutches. Her friend, the artist Bealomondore, helps her execute the plan, and along the way he learns to brandish a sword rather than a paintbrush. To restore their country, Tipper, Bealomondore, and their party must hide the statues in the Valley of the Dragons and find a way to defeat the invading army. |
| Dragons of the Watch | 2011 | Trapped in a forgotten city, bound by secrets, Ellie and Bealomondore must enlist the dragons of the watch to find freedom Ellie knows exactly where she is going. She just wants to experience the pomp and circumstance of a royal wedding, then settle into a simple life with a country husband.With too many choices, Bealomondore's future is a tangle of possibilities. He is respected, well-known, and admired among the elite of Chiril, but Wulder demands he narrow his focus and follow his Creator, one step at a time.Both Ellie and Bealomondore's plans are thwarted when they find themselves lost in an isolated city. As they discern the needs of a group of wild children and a very old man, clues began to surface and a bigger picture is revealed. With the help of the dragons of the watch, can the two tumanhofers find the way out—and perhaps discover their connection to something greater than themselves? |

=== Realm Walkers ===
| Title | Year | Summary |
|---|---|---|
| One Realm Beyond | 2014 | Cantor D’Ahma waited his whole life for this day. Born with a gift to jump between worlds, the young realm walker is finally ready to leave his elderly mentor and accept his role as protector and defender of the realms. But mere hours after he steps through his first portal, Cantor discovers that his job will be more dangerous and difficult than he ever imagined. The realms are plagued with crime and cruelty, and even members of the once-noble Realm Walkers Guild can no longer be trusted. To make matters worse, his first assignment—finding a dragon to assist him on his quest—has led him to Bridger, who is clearly inept and won't leave him alone. With the help of his new friends Bixby and Dukmee, Cantor must uncover the secrets of the corrupt guild before they become too powerful to be stopped. But his skills aren't progressing as fast as he would like, and as he finds himself deeper and deeper in the guild's layers of deceit, Cantor struggles to determine where his true allegiance lies. |
| Two Renegade Realms | 2014 | Cantor, his friend Bixbee, and her mentor, Dukmee, must reunite and work together to find the old realm walker guild's leader, Chomountain. Chomountain has been missing for a very, very long time and the guild is in need of a change of power. While they are trying to find Chomountain they find information that makes bringing back Chomountain even more of a priority. Two wandering realms are coming back and it looks like the inhabitants will ravage a realm while they are there. |

=== Romance Novels ===
- Escape (1999)
- To See His Way (2000)
- The Heart of a Child (2000)
- Out in the Real World (2001)
- City Dreams (2001)
- Christmas Letters (2001)
- Woven Hearts (2002)
- Kaleidoscope (2005)
