= Franz Bardon =

Czech occult writer (1909–1958)

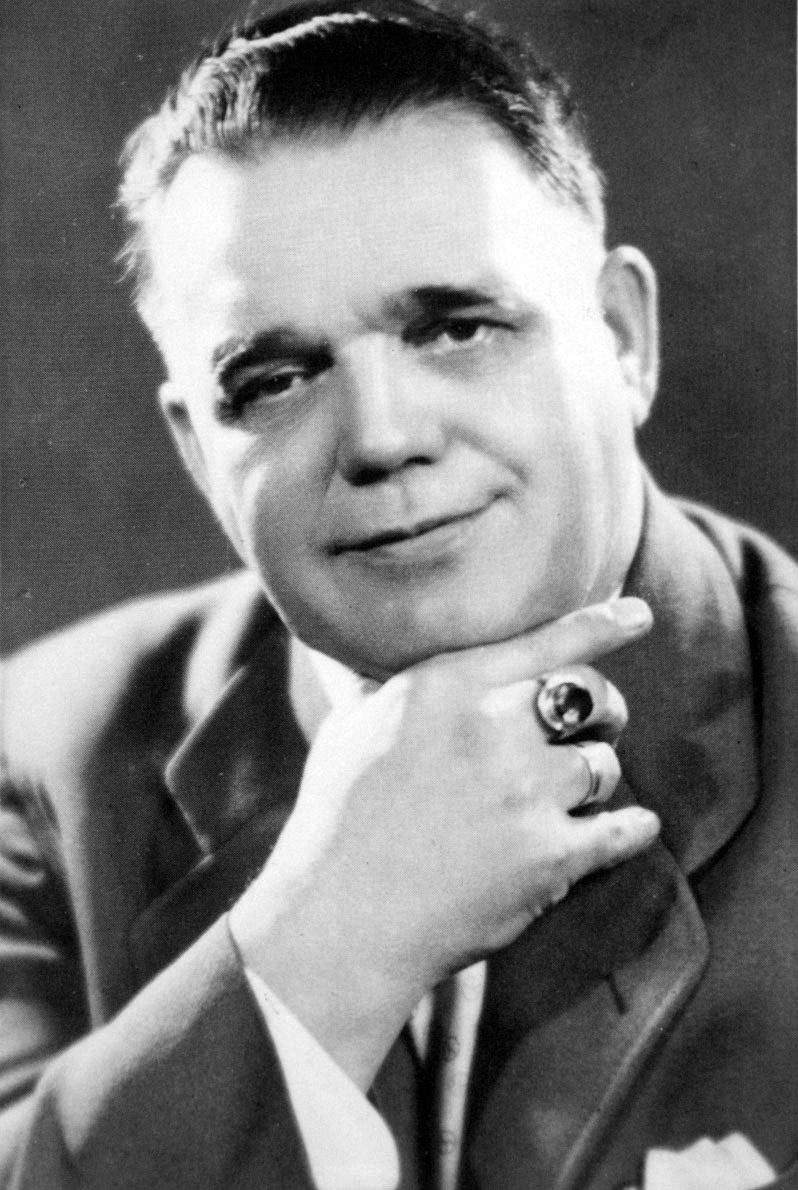
- Franz Bardon
- Born: 1 December 1909; Opava, Austrian Silesia
- Died: 10 July 1958 (aged 48)
- Citizenship: Czechoslovakia

Franz Bardon (1 December 1909 – 10 July 1958) was a Czech occultist and student and teacher of Hermetics.

== Life and death ==
He was born in Troppau (Opava), Austrian Silesia. Bardon continued his work in the fields of Hermetics until 1958 when he was arrested and imprisoned in Brno, Czechoslovakia. Bardon died from pancreatitis on 10 July 1958 while in the custody of police.

== Works ==
Bardon is best known for his three volumes on Hermetic magic. These volumes are Initiation Into Hermetics, The Practice of Magical Evocation and The Key to the True Kabbalah.

An additional fourth work attributed to him by the title of Frabato the Magician, has been supposed by many of his students to be a disguised autobiography. Though the book lists its author as Bardon, it was actually written by his secretary, Otti Votavova. While some elements of the story are based on Bardon's real life experience, most of the book was written as an occult novel with much embellishment on the part of Votavova.

Bardon's works are most notable for their simplicity, their relatively small theoretical sections, and heavy emphasis on practice with many exercises. Students of his, such as Emil Stejnar, Walter Ogris, Martin Faulks, William Mistele and Rawn Clark consider him to have written the best training programs of any magician of the 20th century. They were written with the intention of allowing students who wished to practice magic the means to do so if they could not study under a teacher.

=== Initiation Into Hermetics ===
Initiation into Hermetics provides step-by-step instruction in the form of practical exercises. These exercises are aimed at developing body, soul and spirit. The result of the practical exercises is the development of occult abilities which can be of benefit to the student, in as far as changing his existence for the better.

Bardon's training system is comprehensive. Initiation into Hermetics is divided into 10 practical steps. The program further subdivides each step into three areas – Non-being spirit or Mind (Spiritual abstract universal mental body; Soul as mental body into the astral, psychic and emotional body; the astral body and physical body – with the intent of developing all areas of the self simultaneously and in a balanced way. This is to ensure that the student maintain a balance of the three "bodies", which accelerates progress in the long run and minimizes injury to oneself in the process of growth. Also, there occurs a purification of the personality, where the magician should become incapable of wishing harm to his fellow man. This is an important point since, as the power of the magician increases, so his ability to do harm – even unintentionally, increases. In summary—

1. Mental exercises of the Spirit (or abstract mental being) begin with simply observing the mind and progress from there, with each subsequent exercise building on the previous.
2. Astral exercises of the Soul focus on systematically cataloging the positive and negative aspects of the self and, later, transforming and purifying the negative aspects into positives.
3. Physical exercises of the body stress physical health and development as well as the integration and use of the physical body and physical environment.

=== The Practice of Magical Evocation ===
The Practice of Magical Evocation is Franz Bardon's second volume of The Holy Mysteries. In magical terms, the book is a practical guide to the proper evocation of and communication with divine entities existing in the atmospheric zones surrounding planets, stars, and moon as well as in the earth itself. It is a modern study of direct contact with the universal teachers – the other major works in the field are products of the Medieval, Renaissance, and Reformation periods. Beyond that it offers a glimpse into a complete magical universe. Bardon outlines a totally new and original hierarchy of magic, from the spirits of the four elements to those of the various planets, and even to each degree of the Zodiac. Included with the names and descriptions of the various entities are a collection of entirely unknown magical sigils, as well as an account of ancient Kabbalistic astrology.

Bardon's second work, dealing with the evocation of spirits, outlined first the symbolic meaning of the traditional ritual tools and temple designs, then goes on to describe a method of evoking spirits. In essence, the magician creates an environment hospitable to the entity in the temple or other medium of contact. They then enter an altered state of consciousness through natural meditation, to deep fullness of ecstasy without substances or trance, projecting their consciousness into the sphere of the entity in question, and call it back. Bardon emphasized two points about doing this sort of thing: first, that one must complete the necessary prerequisites of the training program or no success was possible; secondly, that the magician must call the spirit back under their "divine authority", not as a peer, otherwise they are liable to be manipulated by the entity.

=== The Key to the True Kabbalah ===
In The Key to the True Kabbalah, Bardon demonstrates that mysticism of letters and numbers – the "true Kabbalah" – is a universal teaching of great antiquity and depth. Throughout the ages, adepts of every time and place have achieved the highest levels of magical attainment through the understanding of sound, color, number and vibration as embodied in the Kabbalah. This book, the third in Bardon's texts of Hermetic magic, is a practical guide to attainment.

The first two works, addressing the first two Tarots, are pre-requisite to understanding and making use of the third work. Bardon himself says that it is,

...quite up to the reader to study my books merely theoretically. In doing so, he will acquire a knowledge which he would not be able to get from any philosophical book. But knowledge is not yet wisdom. Knowledge depends on the development of the intellectual features of the spirit; wisdom, on the other side, necessitates the equable development of all four aspects of the spirit. Therefore knowledge is mere philosophy, which by itself alone can make a man neither a magician nor a Quabbalist. A learned man will be able to say a lot about magic, Quaballah, etc., but he will never be able to understand the powers and faculties rightly. With these few words I have explained to the reader the difference between the philosopher and the sage.
—Franz Bardon, The Key to The True Kaballah, 1975, pages 12–13

The idea is that the True Kabbalah is not a mantic art, as some perceptions of it (primarily relating to gematria) suggest, but a method of empowering the letters of the alphabet to create magical effects through their combination. Bardon links this to the Tantra of the East, but the basis of this comparison is not quite clear. Like his second book on evocation, the student must finish at least the first eight steps of IIH to get any valid results or have equivalent training in a different system and avoid damage to the psyche which "...can cause a splitting of the personality, schizophrenia, with all its serious consequences." (Bardon, 1975, Page 55). Bardon expands on this real possibility with the following advice...

...someone who wants to apply the methods on the use of genuine kabbalah at once, out of mere curiosity or inconsiderateness, exposes himself to various dangers. For in practice he would get into contact with various powers which he would not be able to control and thus he would be in danger of ruining his health. Therefore, anyone not sufficiently prepared for this step is herewith warned in time.
—The Key to The True Kaballah, Franz Bardon, copyright 1975, page 62

This damage to the psyche "...clearly shows how inexcusable it is if writings of Oriental origin are interpreted incorrectly and translated literally in an intellectual language" as Bardon has "...put the greatest secret into the kabbalist's hands, as in the practical application of the fourfold key, the key of realization by the word. Thousands of years this secret has been guarded." (Bardon, 1975, page 55 and page 112)

=== Frabato the Magician ===
Frabato the Magician is a novelised biography of Bardon written by his secretary Otti Votavova, though attributed to Bardon himself because he probably spoke about his preoccupations of life with her. The name of the protagonist, Frabato, was Bardon's stage name during his career as a performing magician. Set in Dresden, Germany, in the early 1930s, the story describes Frabato's magical battles with the members of a powerful and dangerous Black Lodge, his escape from Germany during the final days of the Weimar Republic, and the beginning of the spiritual mission which was to culminate in his writing a series of classic books on Hermetic magic. It also describes sinister occult forces which lay behind the rise of the Third Reich.

The essential and relevant part of the book is the revelation that Franz Bardon was the last reincarnation of the spirit embodied by Hermes Trismegistus, the esoteric creator of Hermeticism and the founder of Freemasonry, who, contrary to what Freemasons think, paid the karma that generated when he lived as Hermes Trismegistus, because the masonic idea of how the Laws of the Universe (the Law of God or Divine Justice) work, does not correspond to Bardon's ideas.

The moral basis of Freemasonry is that the balance of good and bad actions is achieved if the mason compensates for his bad actions with good actions or vice versa, but decides what actions he will take to find the desired equilibrium, where it is the transgressor of the Universal Law who decides both what he will do and to whom he will do it. Hence, as the good deeds of Hermes did not serve as penance or payment of his karma to obtain forgiveness, it is God who forgives and decides the penance or karma to pay and when to apply it, Hermes paid his karma as Bardon. In order to be in harmony with the Universe, the transgressor must follow the norms that God imposes. Respect God's laws and in case of sin repent, ask for forgiveness, and pay the penance or karma that God imposes in giving a choice when offering incarnation of the spirit in the next life.

In the edition published by Merkur, Wisdom of the Occident, Bardon's secretary Votavova wrote an annex, "In Memoriam" where she refers to the characters embodying Bardon's spirit as, among others: Hermes Trismegistos, Nostradamus, Lao Tse, Apollonius of Tyana, Robert Fludd, and Count Saint Germain. In his previous physical life he was a wise man (Mahatma) from the mountains named Mahum Ta-Tah, spelled like Ha-Khu-Ma-Na-Ta-Tah. Votavova also says that Bardon once told her that he embodied his own spiritual soul as a young boy between the ages of 14 and 21 and he was the one who decided to be the spiritual master of Victor Bardon, his own Father, who in his desire to become a divine initiate, asked -in his prayers- to know his true guru. The spirit of Bardon incarnated his only son, through an exchange of spirit.
