= Raków, Kielce County =

Raków
- Village
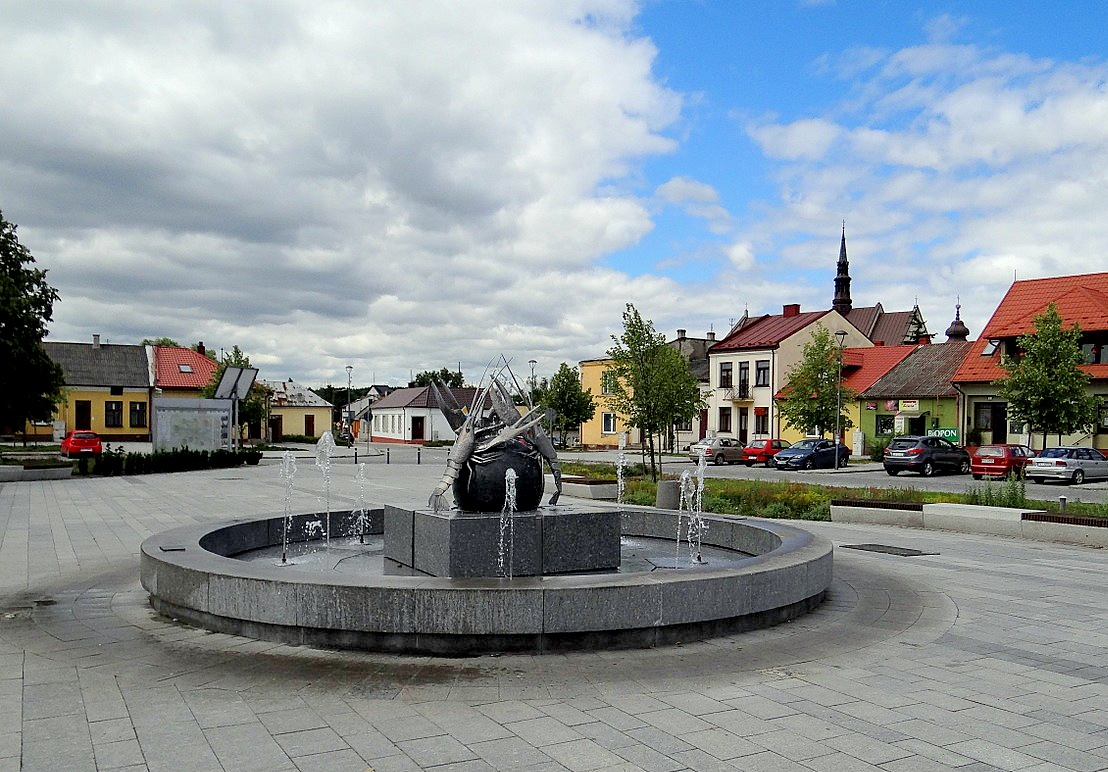
- Plac Wolności (Liberty Square)

- Coat of arms

- Location within Poland
- Coordinates: 50°40′25″N 21°2′44″E
- Country: Poland
- Voivodeship: Świętokrzyskie
- County: Kielce
- Gmina: Raków

Population
  - Total: 1,213
- Time zone: UTC+1 (CET)
  - Summer (DST): UTC+2 (CEST)
- Vehicle registration: TKI
- Website: http://www.rakow.pl/

Raków [ˈrakuf] is a village in Kielce County, Świętokrzyskie Voivodeship, in south-central Poland. It is the seat of the gmina (administrative district) called Gmina Raków. It lies in historic Lesser Poland, approximately 39 km (24 mi) south-east of the regional capital Kielce.

== History ==
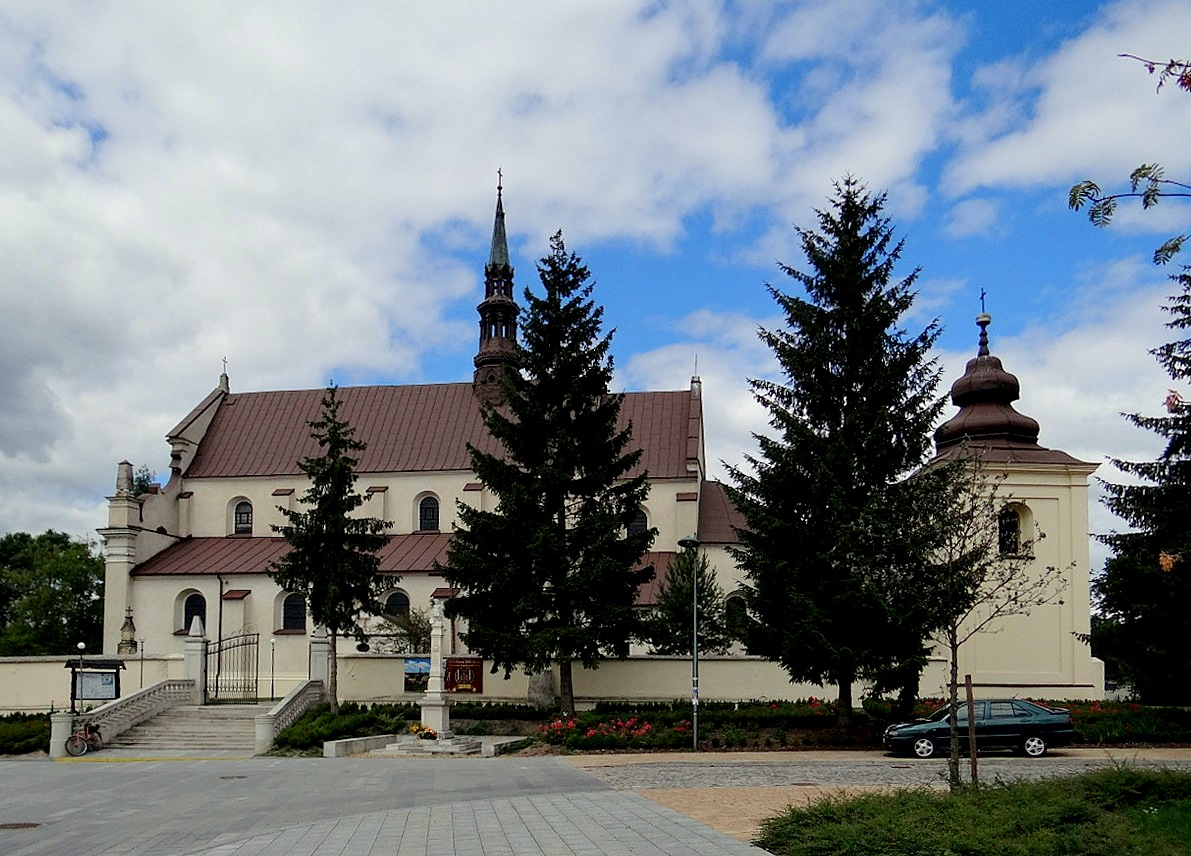
Baroque Holy Trinity church

Raków was founded in 1569 by Jan Sienieński, a Calvinist who was castellan of Żarnów, as the centre of the Polish Brethren and a place of religious tolerance. The town coat of arms includes a crayfish and is derived from the Warnia coat of arms of Sienieński's Arian wife, Jadwiga Gnoińska. It was a private town, administratively located in the Sandomierz County in the Sandomierz Voivodeship in the Lesser Poland Province of the Kingdom of Poland. The Socinian Racovian Academy was founded in 1602 by Jakub Sienieński, Jan Sienieński's son. By the 1630s, the town had grown to 15,000 inhabitants, with businesses centering on the academy.

As the Counter-Reformation in Poland gathered force, pressure began to be used against the Socinians. On April 19, 1638, an incident occurred in which some young students of the academy destroyed or removed a cross, giving the royal court the pretext needed to ban Arian activities, including printing and the schools, and sentenced teachers to exile, many heading south to the Principality of Transylvania. Jesuit scholar Szymon Starowolski justified the closing of Protestant schools (in 1638 and 1640), and Protestant centers and printing presses (in 1638, the press at Raków), as the "duty of good pastors" and as a legitimate act of the King and the Republic. The Arian church in Raków was demolished in 1640. In 1641 Jakub Zadzik, archbishop of Kraków, began construction of the magnificent Church of the Holy Trinity in Raków on the same site and settled Franciscan friars in Raków to reconvert the Polish Brethren. The friars left the town around 1649. The main Arian buildings were destroyed, and more destruction was brought by Cossacks and Hungarians in 1657. By 1700 the town had only 700 inhabitants left.

After the Third Partition of Poland, Raków was in the Austrian Partition. Following the Austro-Polish War of 1809, it was regained by Poles and included within the short-lived Duchy of Warsaw, and after its dissolution it fell to the Russian Partition of Poland. In 1820, Raków had 926 inhabitants, in 1864 their number rose to 2,007, a significant part being Jewish. In 1869, like many other Polish towns, Raków lost its town status and town privileges as punishment for the unsuccessful Polish January Uprising.

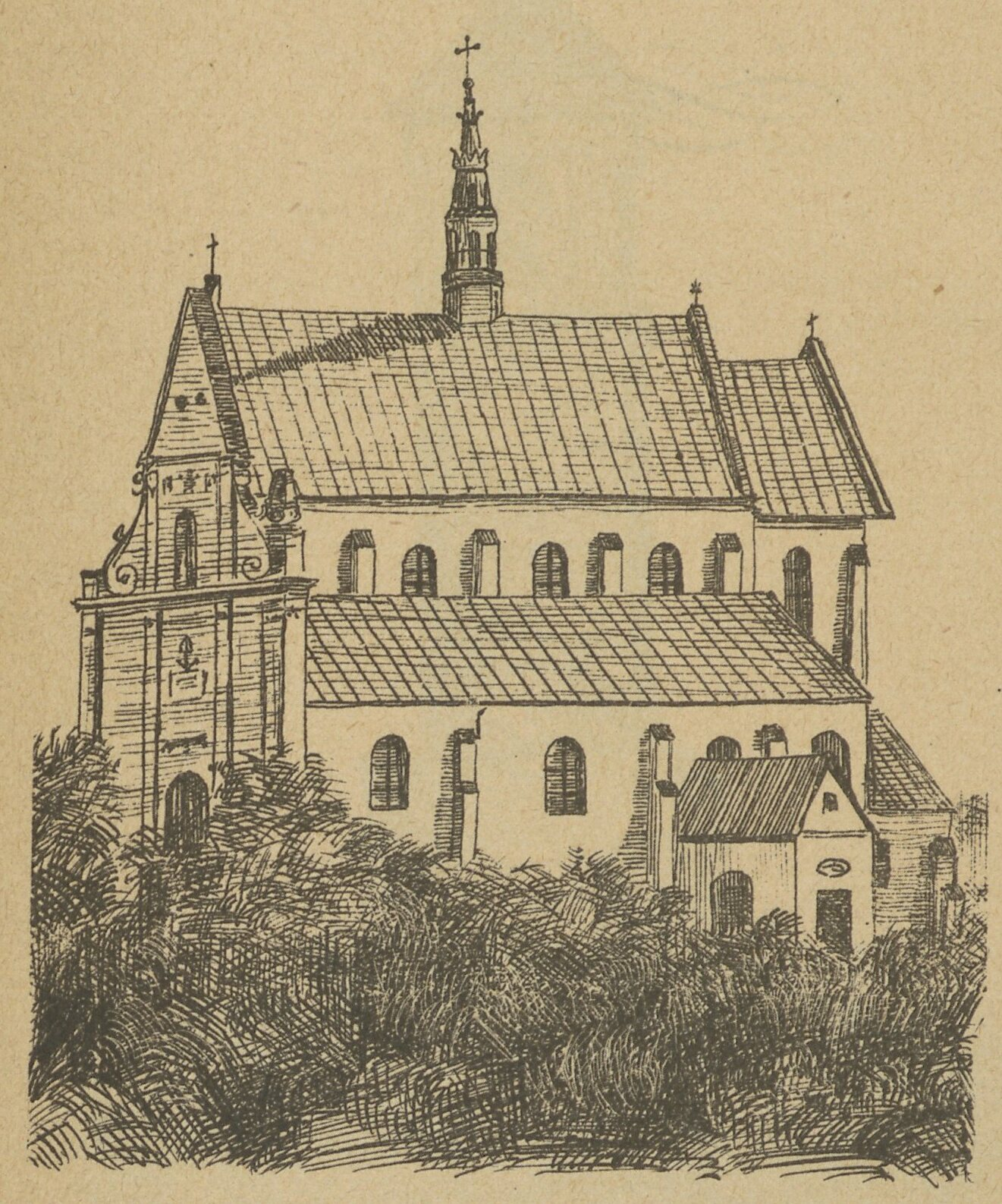
Holy Trinity church, before 1907

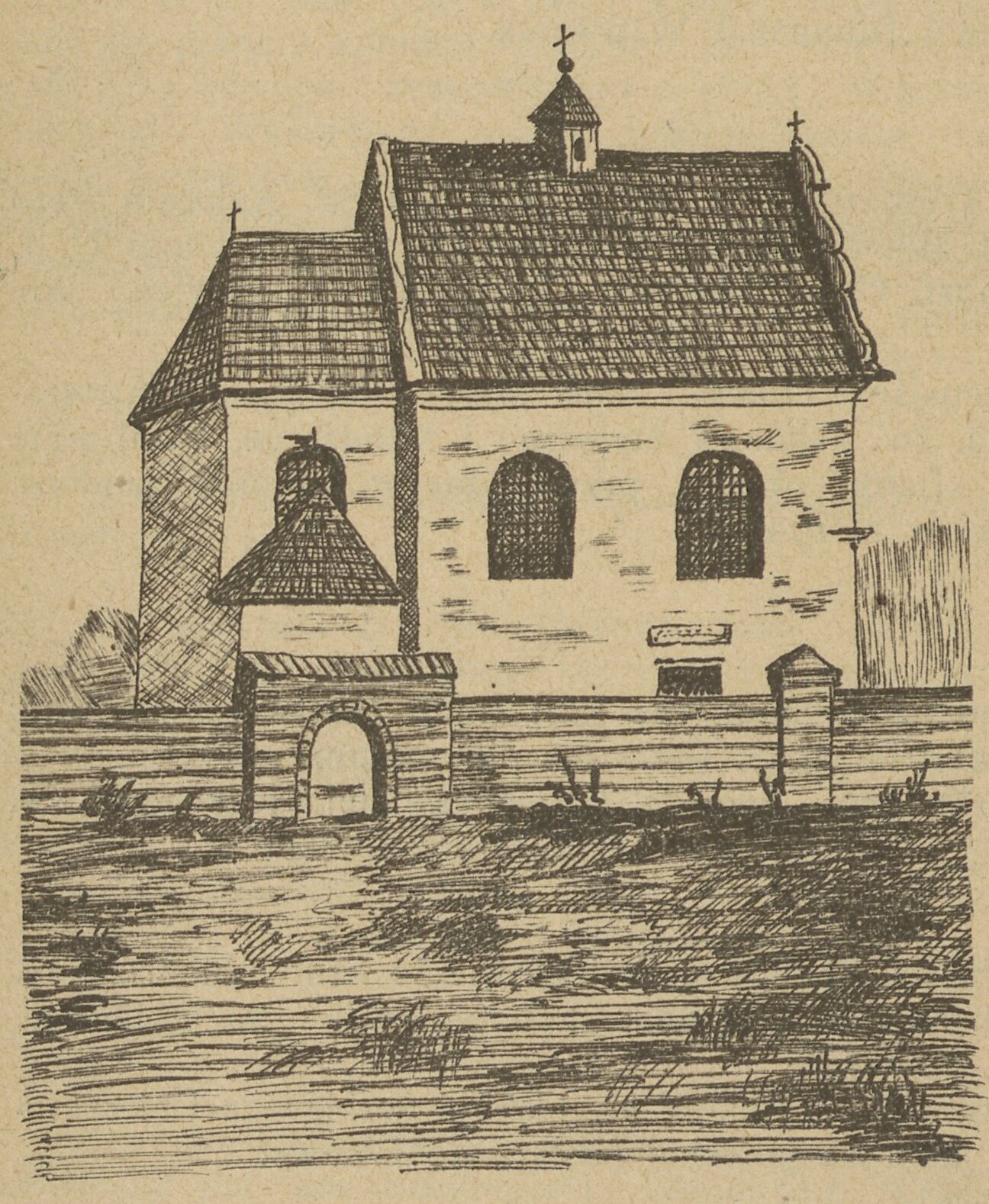
Saint Anne church, before 1907

== People ==
- Fausto Paolo Sozzini, Italian Arian
- Lelio Sozzini, uncle of the above
- Stanisław Lubieniecki, Socinian
- Piotr of Goniądz, Socinian
- Gregory Paul of Brzeziny, Socinian
- Marcin Czechowic, Socinian
- Jan Niemojewski, Socinian
- Mikołaj Sienicki, Socinian
- Andrzej Wiszowaty, Socinian
