= Alojzy Liguda =

Polish Roman Catholic priest and martyr

Blessed Alojzy Liguda S.V.D.
- Born: 23 January 1898; Winów, Poland
- Died: 8 December 1942 (aged 44); Dachau Concentration Camp
- Venerated in: Roman Catholic Church
- Beatified: 13 June 1999, Poland by Pope John Paul II
- Feast: 8 December

Aloysius Liguda (23 January 1898 – 8 December 1942) was a Polish priest and is venerated as a blessed martyr of the Society Of The Divine Word Missionaries (SVD). Liguda was a chaplain, and teacher. He died at Dachau concentration camp in the course of medical experimentation.

== Life ==
Alojzy Liguda was born in Winów near Opole, Poland in 1892, the youngest of seven children of Wojciech and Rozalia Przybyl Liguda. His father led pilgrimages to the Basilica of the Visitation in Wambierzyce and to Mount St. Anne. Liguda was a good student; he became interested in missions in China and Africa from reading magazines.

At the age of fifteen, Liguda entered the Divine Word minor seminary at Nysa. He was drafted in 1917 and sent to the French front as an artilleryman. After the war, he returned to the seminary to complete his studies. In 1920 he went to the Society of the Divine Word novitiate in Mödling, Austria. He was then sent for teacher training to Pieniezno, where he taught Latin and mathematics at the minor seminary. From there he returned to St. Gabriel's in Mödling for further studies in dogmatics and church history. At age 35, in 1927, he was ordained as a priest.

Liguda was assigned to the provincial house in Górna Grupa. After validating his secondary education certificate he was accepted to the Polish Philology Faculty at the University of Poznań. In Poznań he also served a chaplain and religious education teacher at the Ursuline Sisters school for girls. He returned to Grupa and taught at the minor seminary; he also served as chaplain to the garrison in Grupa on Sundays. In the summer of 1939 he became the rector of the monastery at Gorna Grupa.

In February 1940, the seminary was turned into a makeshift detention camp for the religious and seminarians. He was sent from one camp to another: Nowy Port in Gdańsk, Sachsenhausen, and Stutthof. By December he was in Dachau and, since he knew German, he was a translator for most of the internees. He could have applied for release from the camp as his family had German citizenship, he himself was a war veteran, and two brothers died at the front. Liguda did not apply because he felt responsible for his Polish pupils. He always tried to keep up morale with his calm demeanor and a ready joke.

Liguda contracted tuberculosis but by December 1942 his health had much improved. Nonetheless, he was placed on the "disabled" list by a kapo in revenge for his criticism of the kapo's unfair distribution of food. Liguda and fellow inmates were transported by German soldiers to a nearby water reservoir where they all drowned. The Germans were conducting medical experiments to determine the effect of ice cold water on the human body, relating to the rescue of downed pilots. The family was advised, however, that the cause of death was tuberculosis.

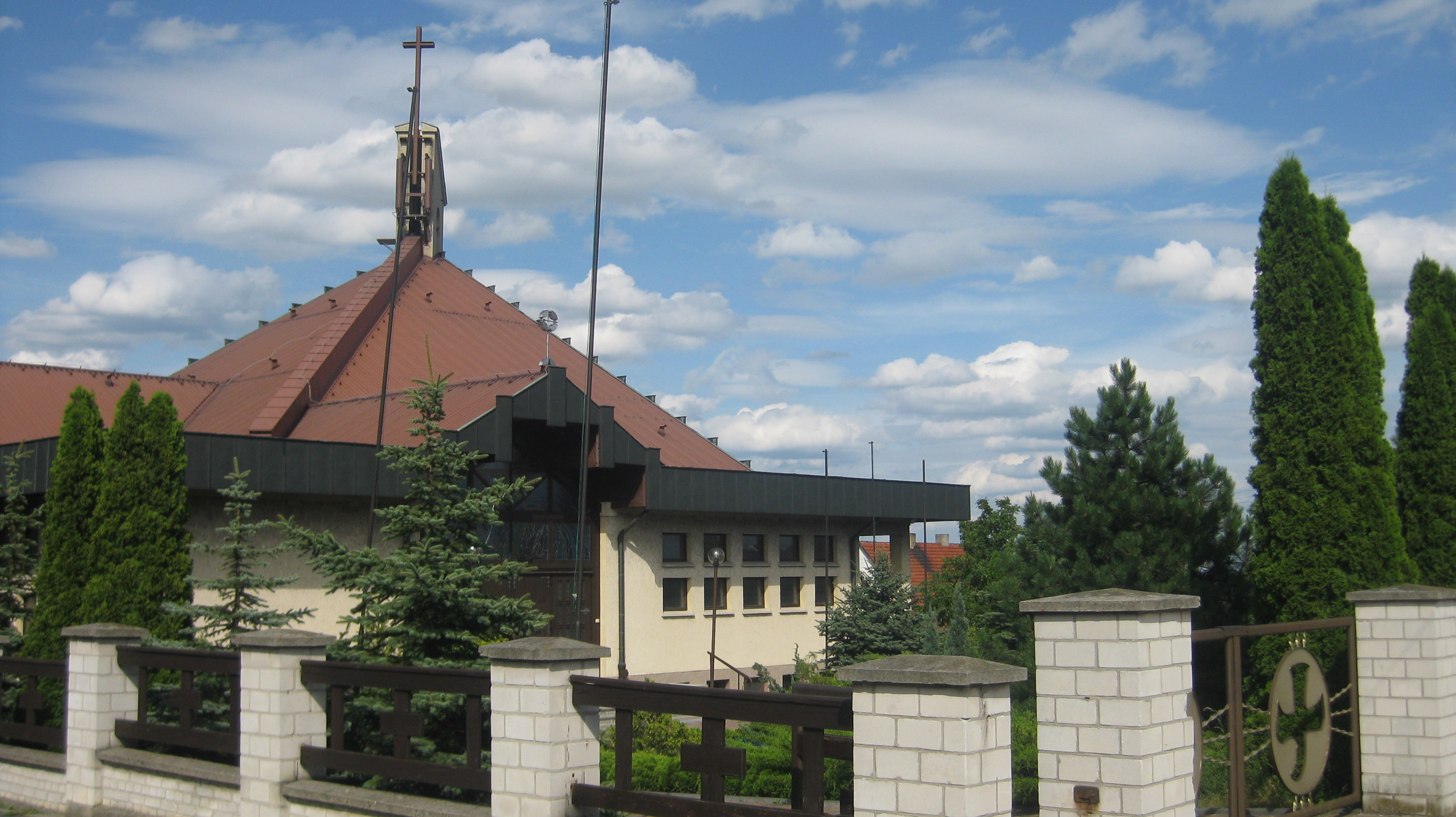
Winau Kirche

His body was burnt in the Dachau crematorium; the coffin with ashes was handed over to relatives and buried in the family tomb. In 2016, some of the ashes, as well as those of other martyrs of the Dachau concentration camp were placed in the Church of the Holy Spirit in his hometown of Winów.

"In the Dachau prison camp near Munich in Germany, Blessed Louis Liguda, priest of the Society of the Divine Word and martyr, who, during the wartime invasion of Poland, was slain by the prison guards witness to Christ the Lord until death."(Roman Martyrology)

== Works ==
- Audi filia, - regarding Pope Pius XI’s encyclical "About the Christian Education"
- Go forward and higher - conferences and sermons
- Bread and Salt - Sunday homilies
