= Wielopolski family =

Polish szlachta family

Wielopolski
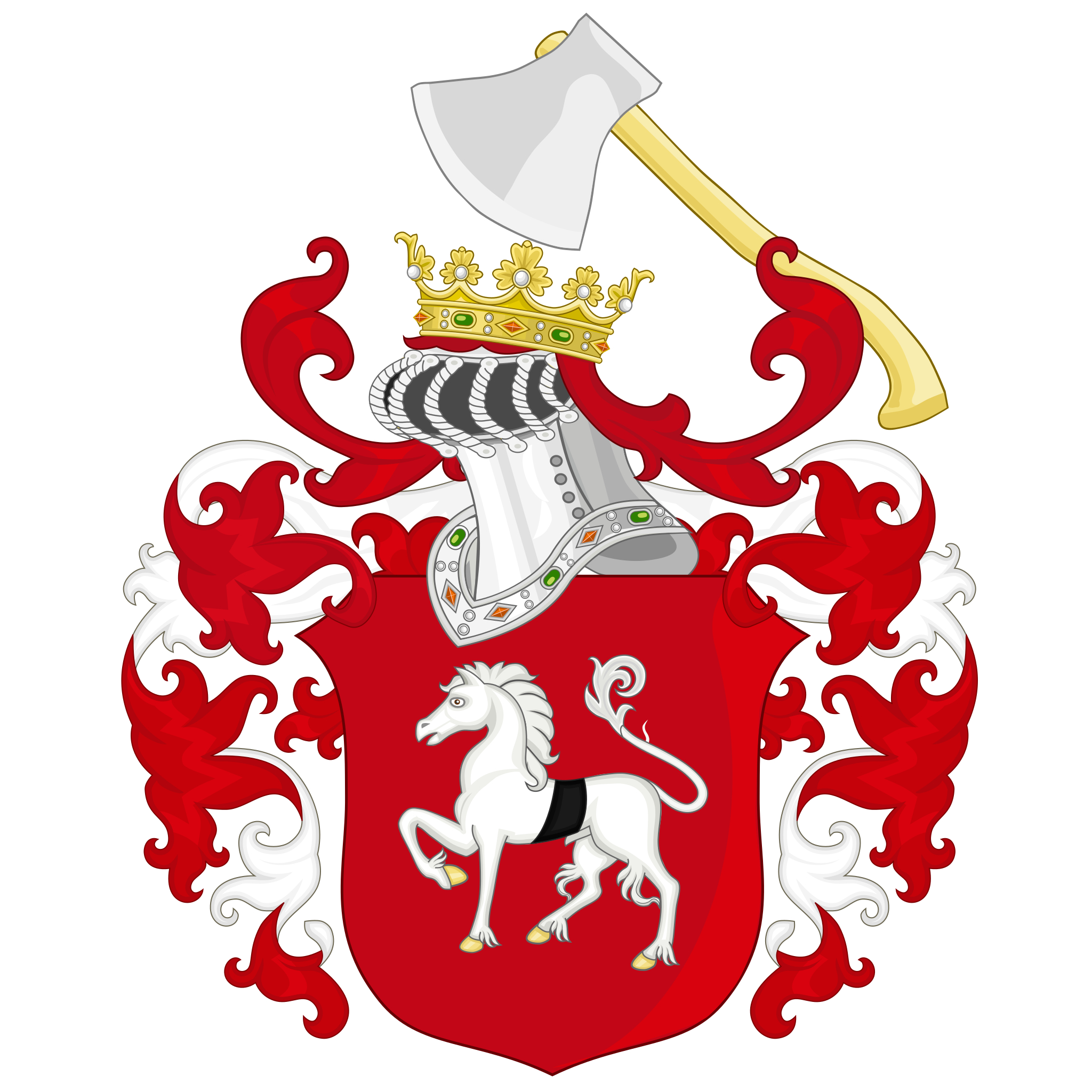
- Current region: Poland
- Members: Jan Wielopolski the elder Jan Wielopolski; Franciszek Wielopolski; Aleksander Wielopolski; Zygmunt Wielopolski
- Connected families: Gonzaga, Potocki, Jabłonowski, Lubomirski
- Estate: Pieskowa Skała

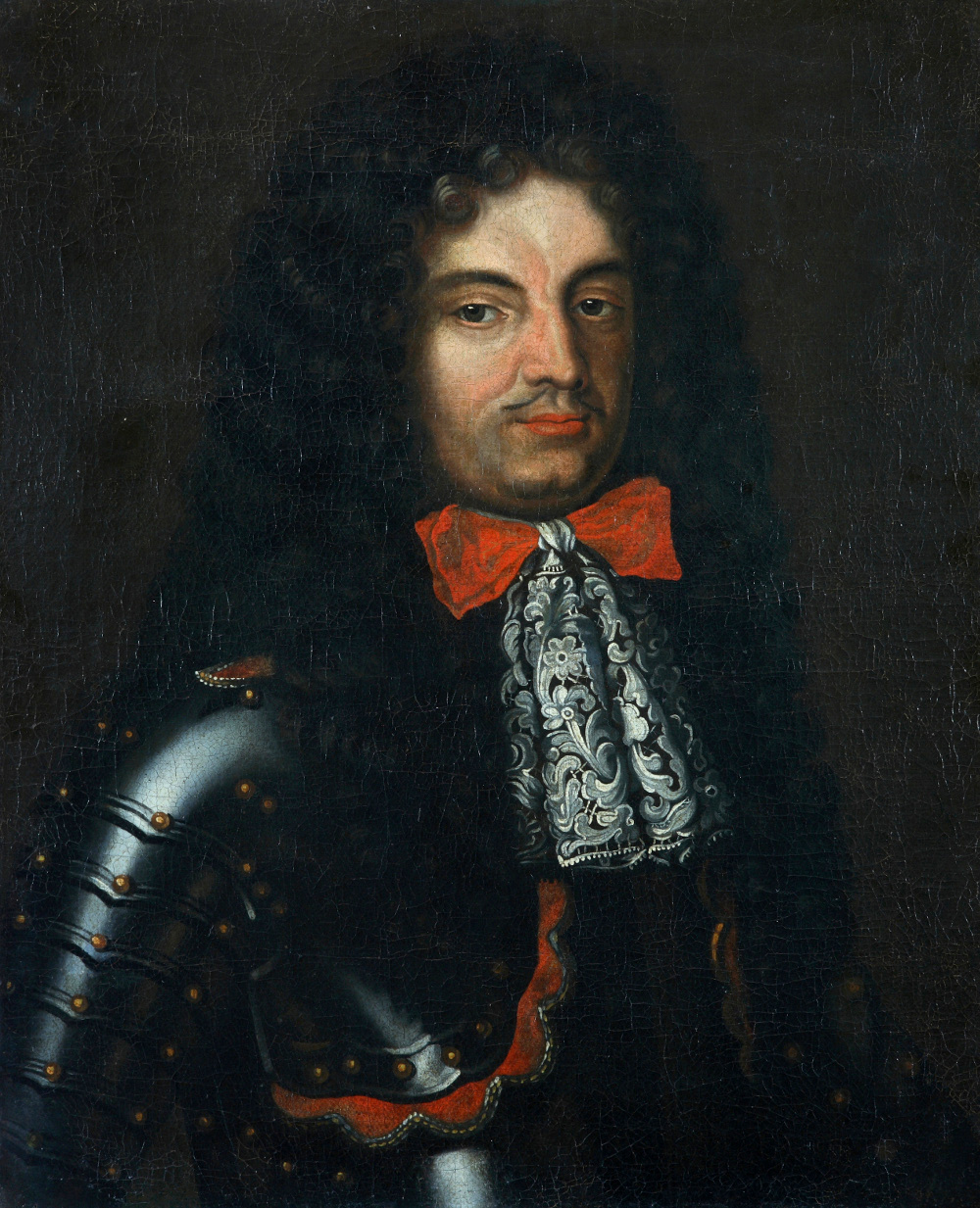
Jan Wielopolski, Grand Chancellor of the Crown of the Polish–Lithuanian Commonwealth

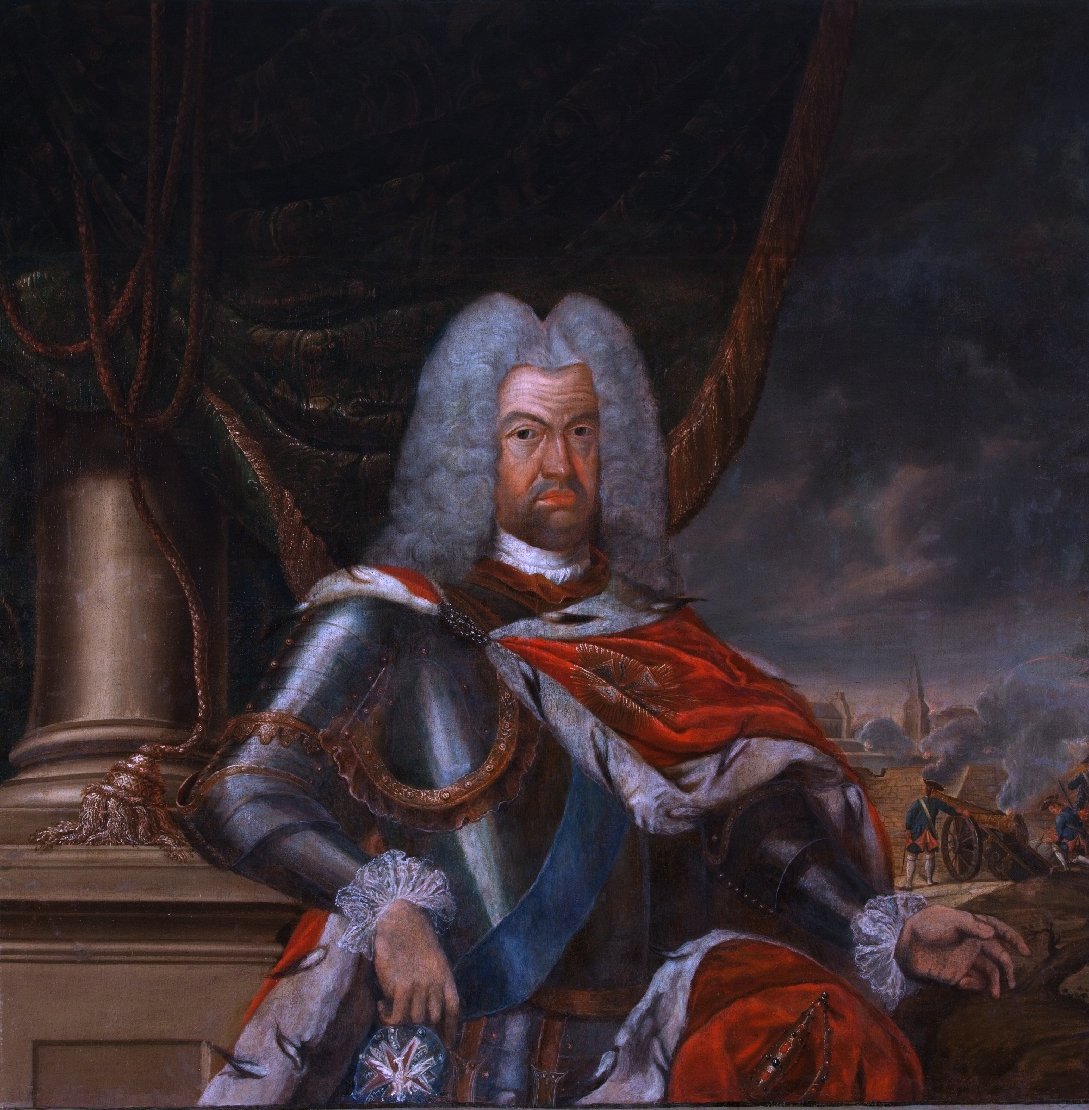
Franciszek Wielopolski the Elder

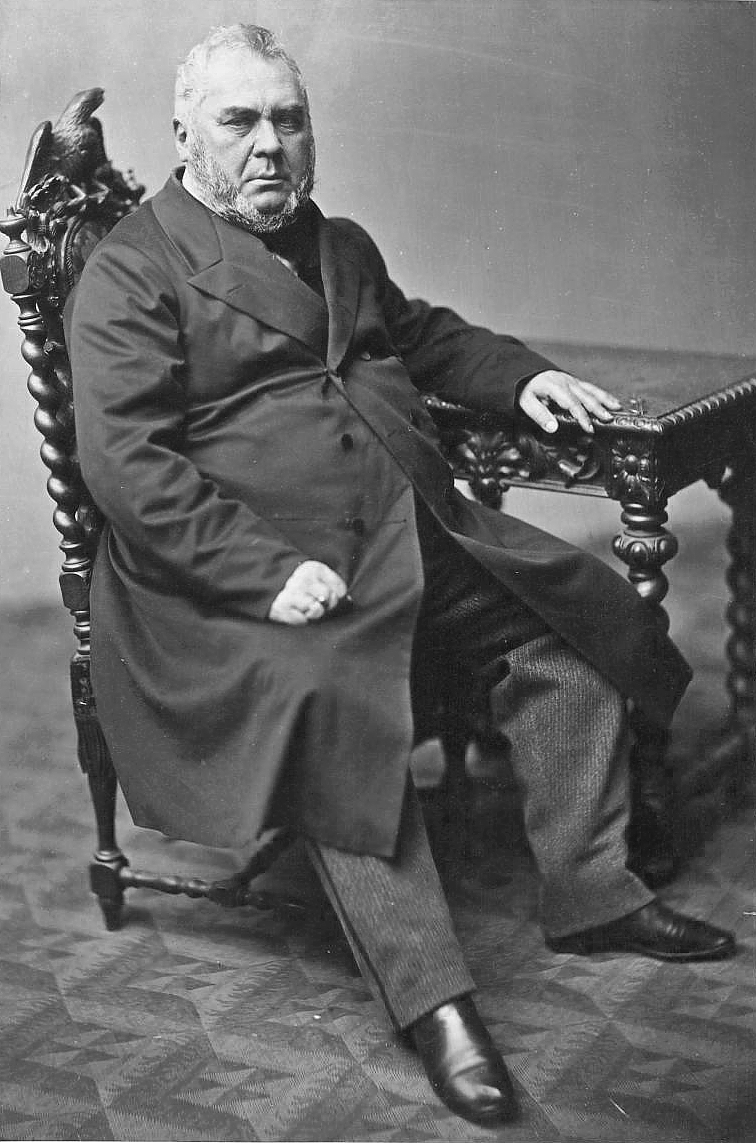
Aleksander Wielopolski, Chief of the Civil Government of Congress Kingdom of Poland

The House of Wielopolski (plural: Wielopolscy, feminine form: Wielopolska) was a Polish noble family

(szlachta), magnates in the Polish–Lithuanian Commonwealth in the 17th and 18th centuries and the family of a numerous Polish politicians during the times of Russian rule over Poland in the 19th century.

As of August 2025 there are still living descendants of the Wielopolski family in Poland.

== History ==
The Wielopolski family is said to originate in the 17th century with the founder of the dynasty being Kasper Wielopolski whose son Jan Wielopolski 'the elder' acquired the title of Count of the Holy Roman Empire in 1656 by the charter of Emperor Ferdinand III.

Quite notably Jan Wielopolski a member of the Wielopolski family held the position of Grand Chancellor of the Crown from the year 1678 to his death in 1688 during the reign of Jan III Sobieski.

In 1729 the Wielopolskis inherited the title of Marquis from the Myszkowski family who originally received it through the adoption of Zygmunt Myszkowski into the Gonzaga family.

In the 19th century during the years of Russian rule over Poland the Wielopolski family retained political influence which also saw them having a member of their family Aleksander Wielopolski appointed head of Poland's Civil Administration in 1862 a position he held until 1863 when the January Uprising broke out.

Through the political power of Aleksander Wielopolski Zygmunt Wielopolski was appointed the President of Warsaw in the years 1862 to 1863, a position he lost due to the beginning of the January Uprising.

== Coat of arms ==
The Wielopolski family used the Starykoń coat of arms which was a variation of the Topór coat of arms which was shared amongst many different families in the Polish-Lithuanian Commonwealth. The Starykoń coat of arms itself has many variations itself as time progressed.

Starykoń

Starykoń (Bystrzonowski Variant)

== Notable members ==
- Elżbieta Bobola née Wielopolska (c. 1520-1615)
- Aleksander Wielopolski (1803-1877)
- Alfred Wielopolski (1905-1996)
- Franciszek Wielopolski (c. 1665-1732)
- Jan Wielopolski (c. 1630–1688)
- Jan Wielopolski the elder (c. 1605-1668)
- Jan Wielopolski (1700–1773)
- Józef Stanisław Wielopolski (1777-1815)
- Kasper Wielopolski
- Zygmunt Andrzej Wielopolski (1833-1902)
- Helena Wielopolska wife of Clemens Scivoli (beginning of the 19th century in Malta)
- Zygmunt Konstanty Wielopolski

== Palaces ==
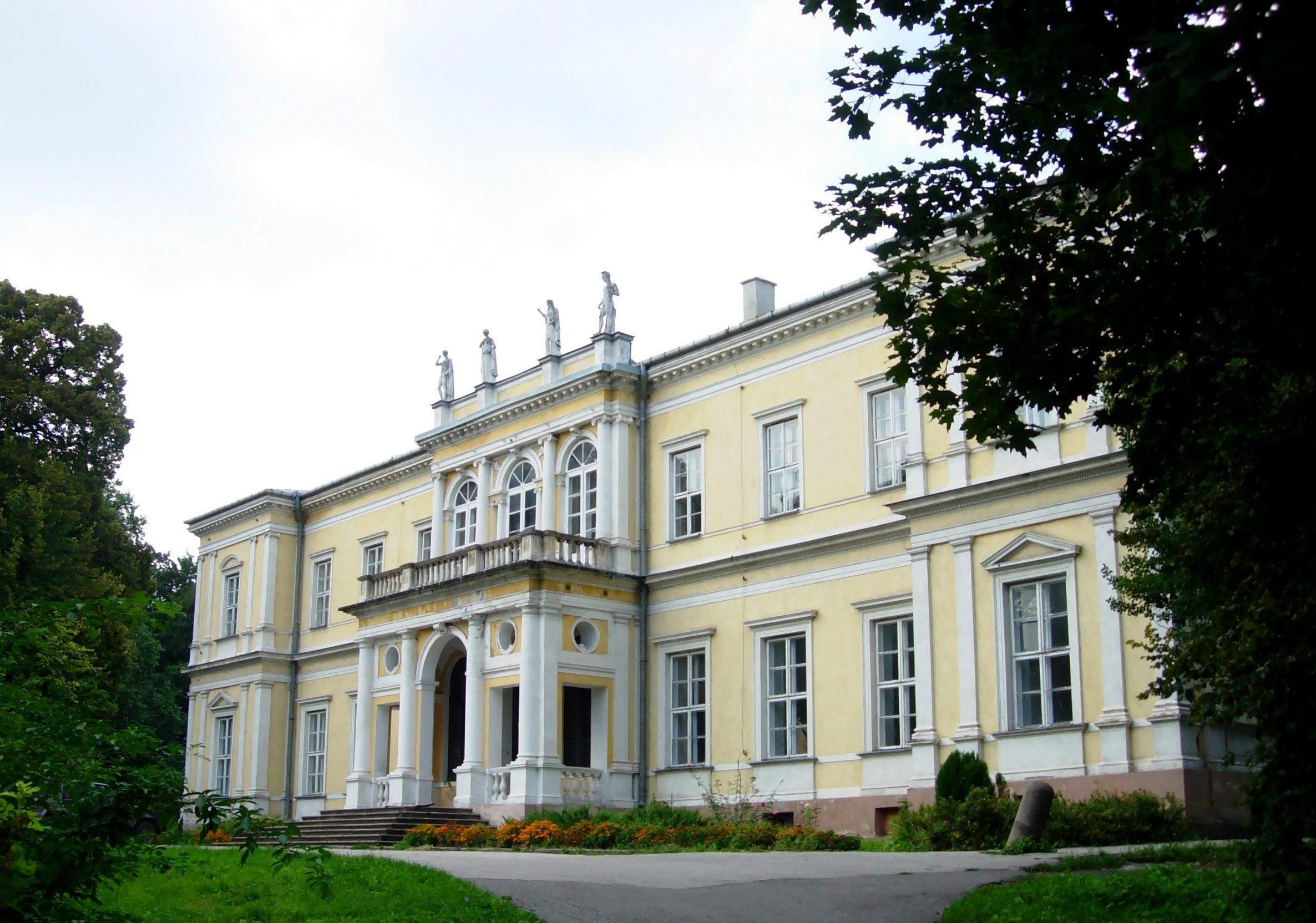
Wielopolski palace in Chroberz

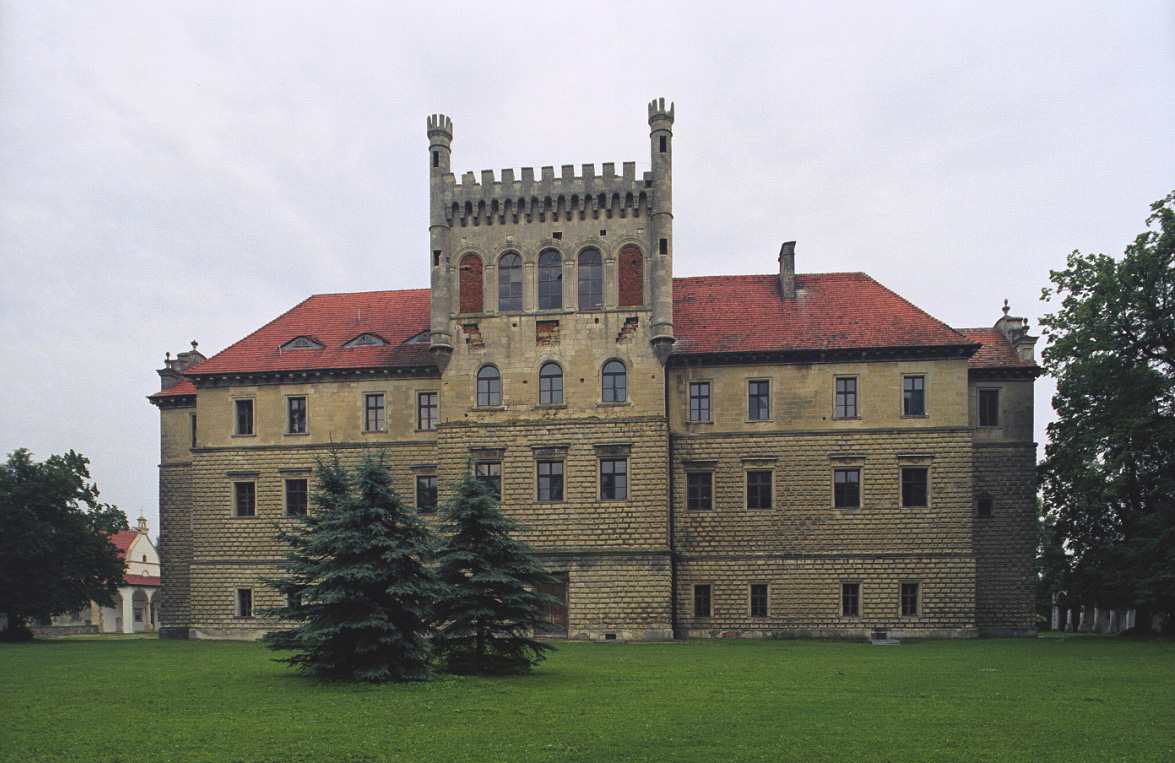
Mirów Castle in Książ Wielki

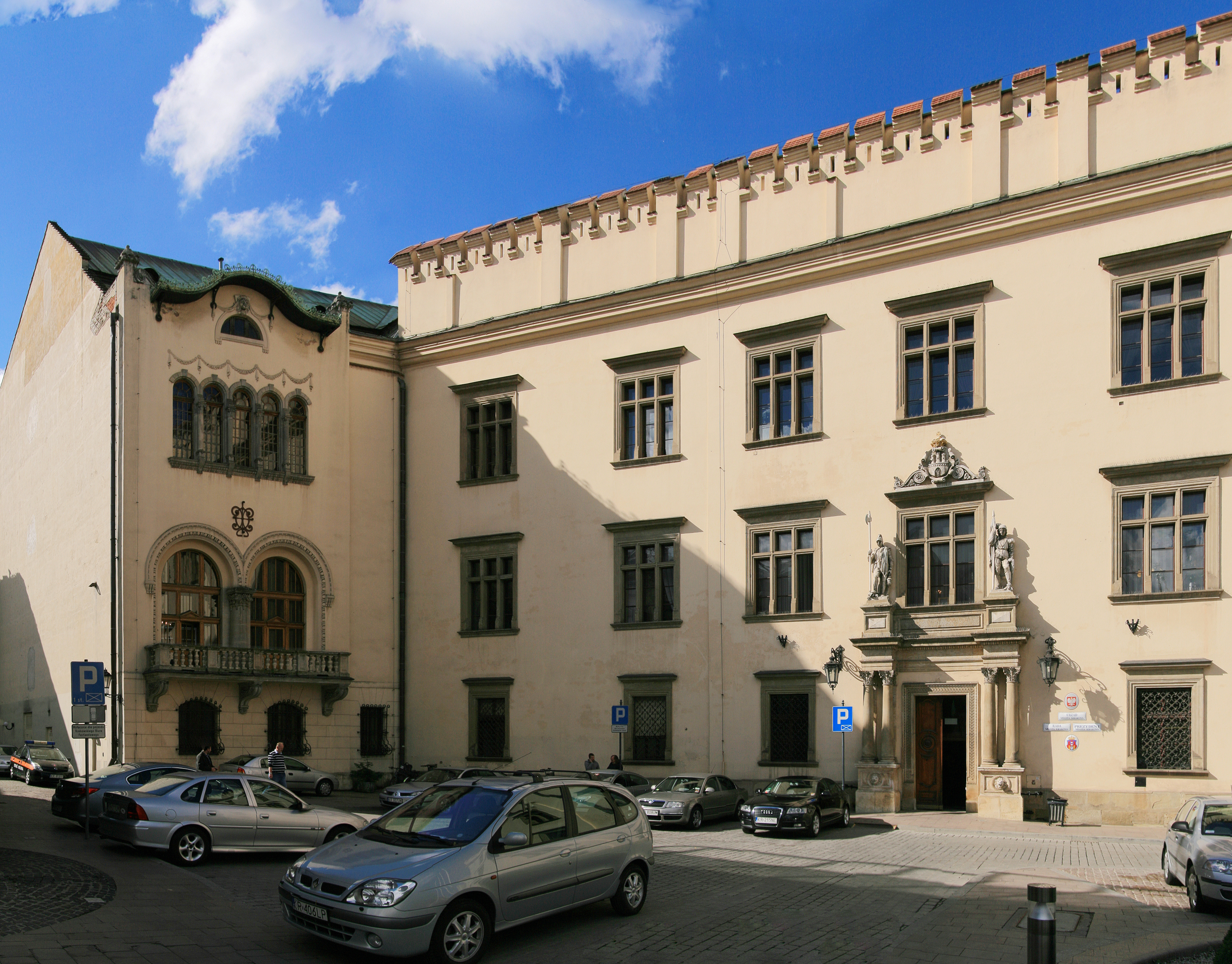
Wielopolski Palace in Kraków (now the meeting place of the Kraków City Council & President of Kraków)

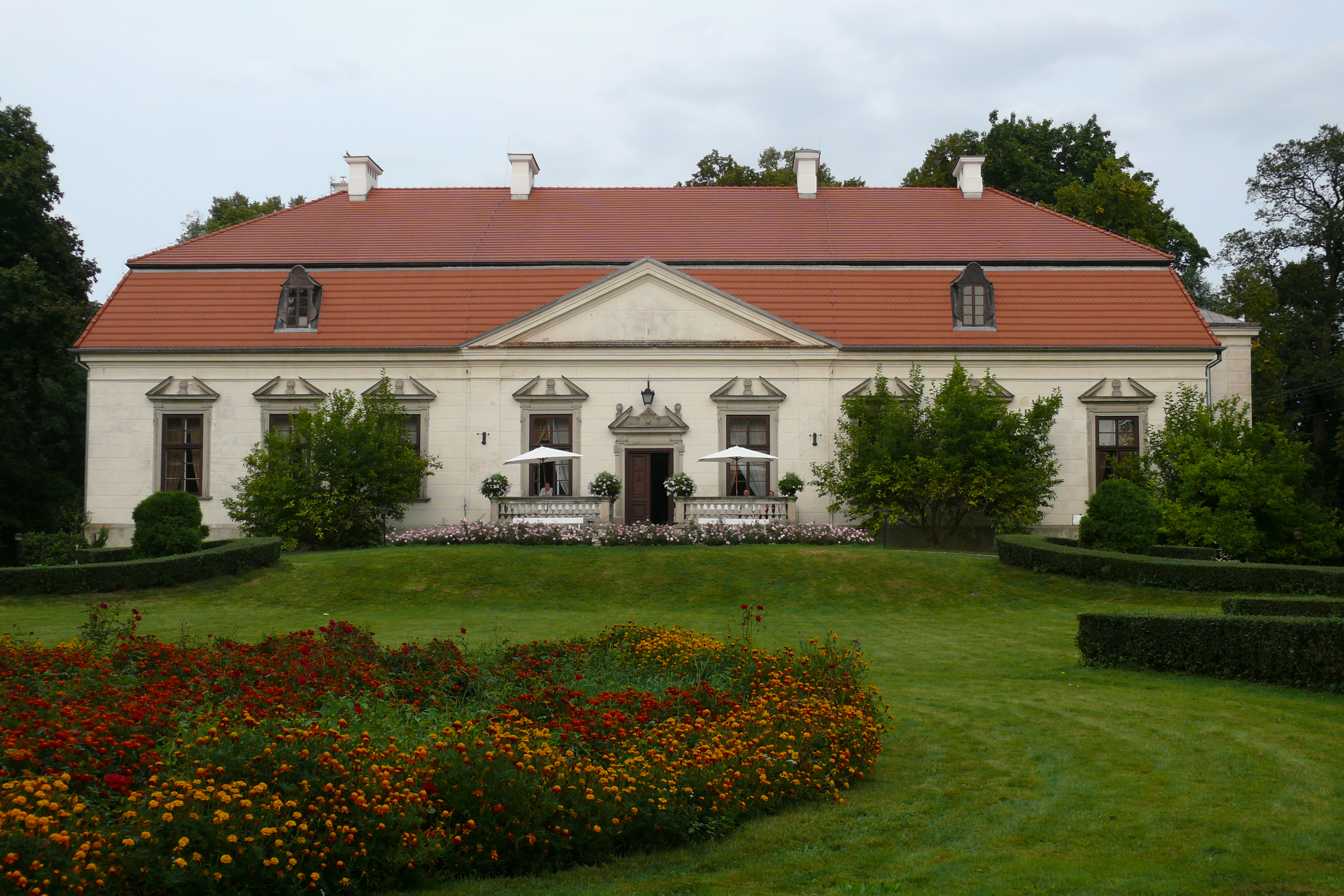
Obóry Manor in Obory, Piaseczno County

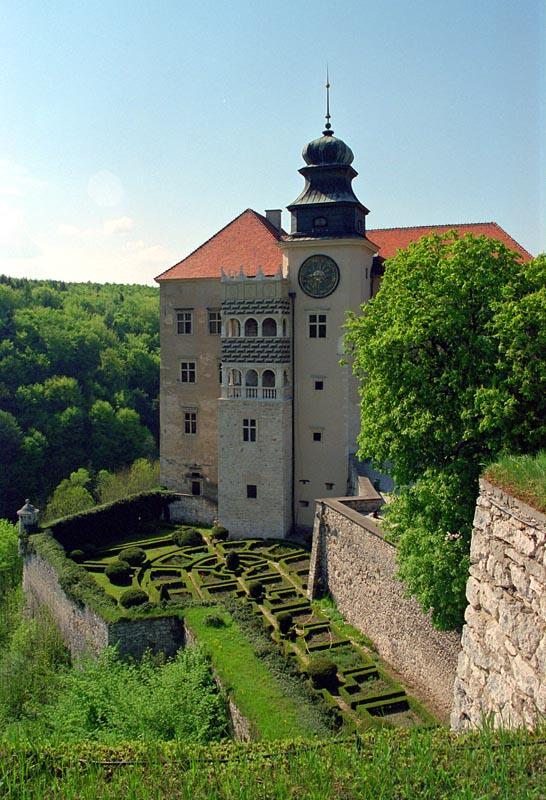
Pieskowa Skała Castle

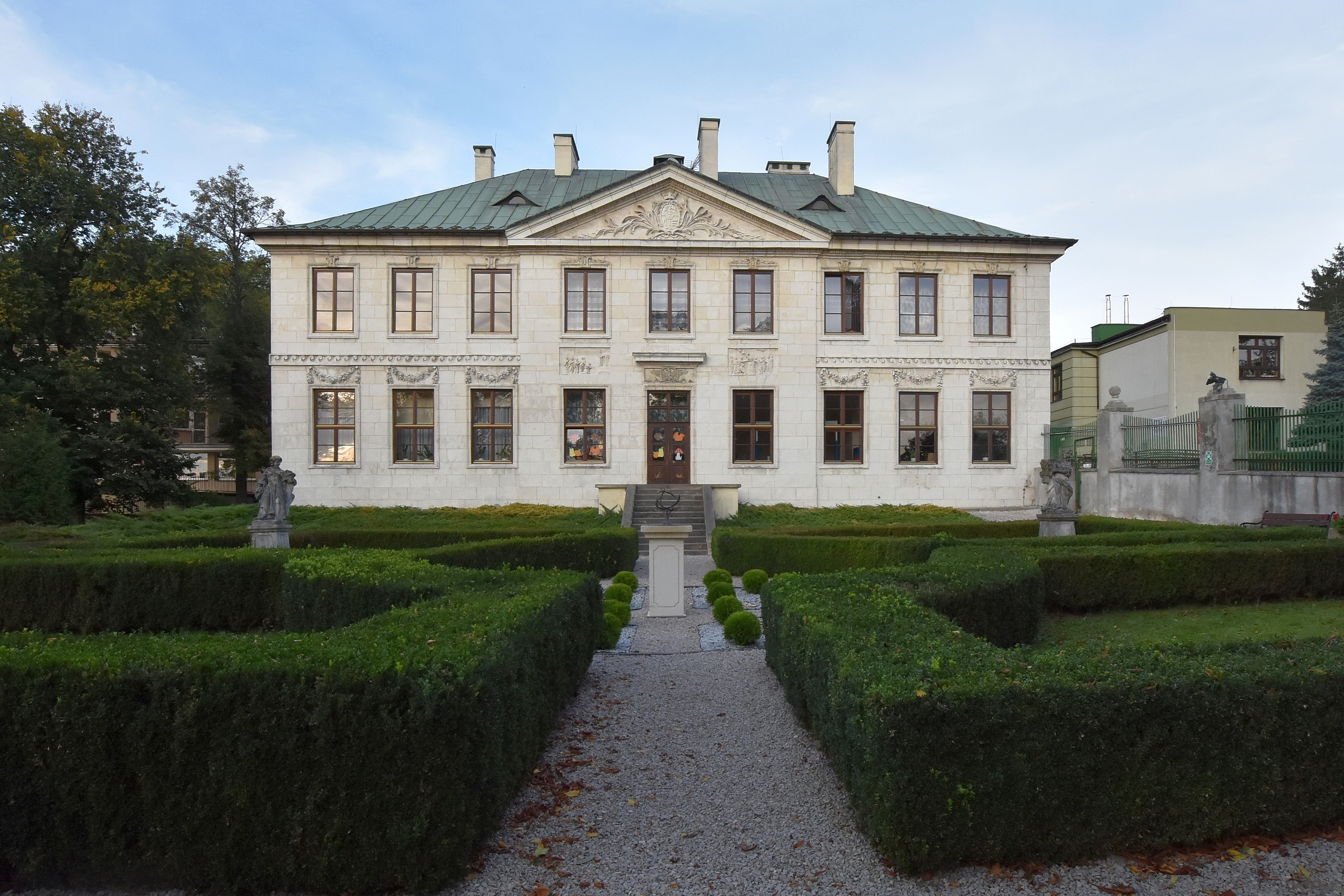
Wielopolski Palace in Pińczów

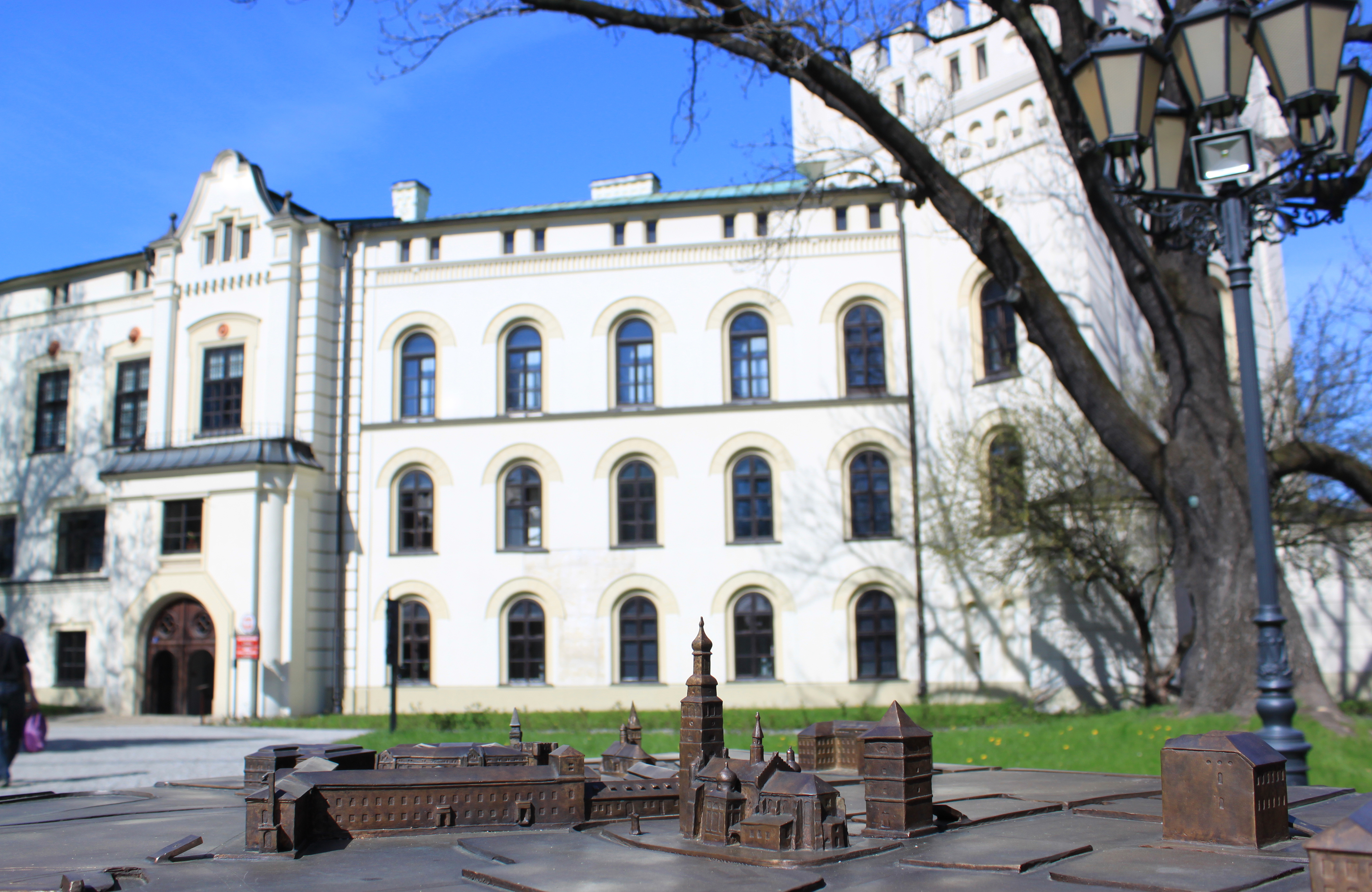
Old Castle in Żywiec

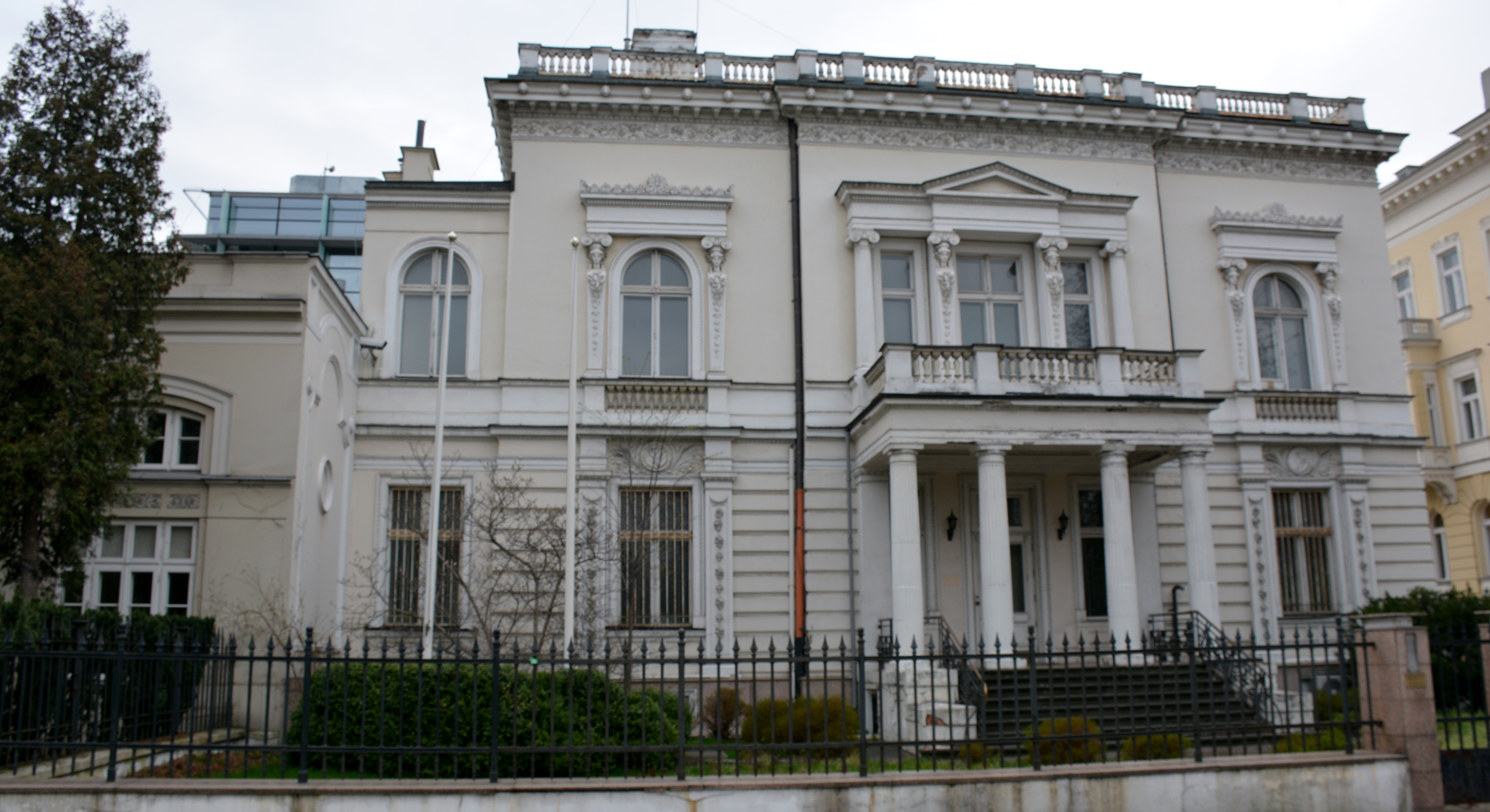
Wielopolski Palace in Warsaw (temporarily served as the Embassy of the United Kingdom until 2008)

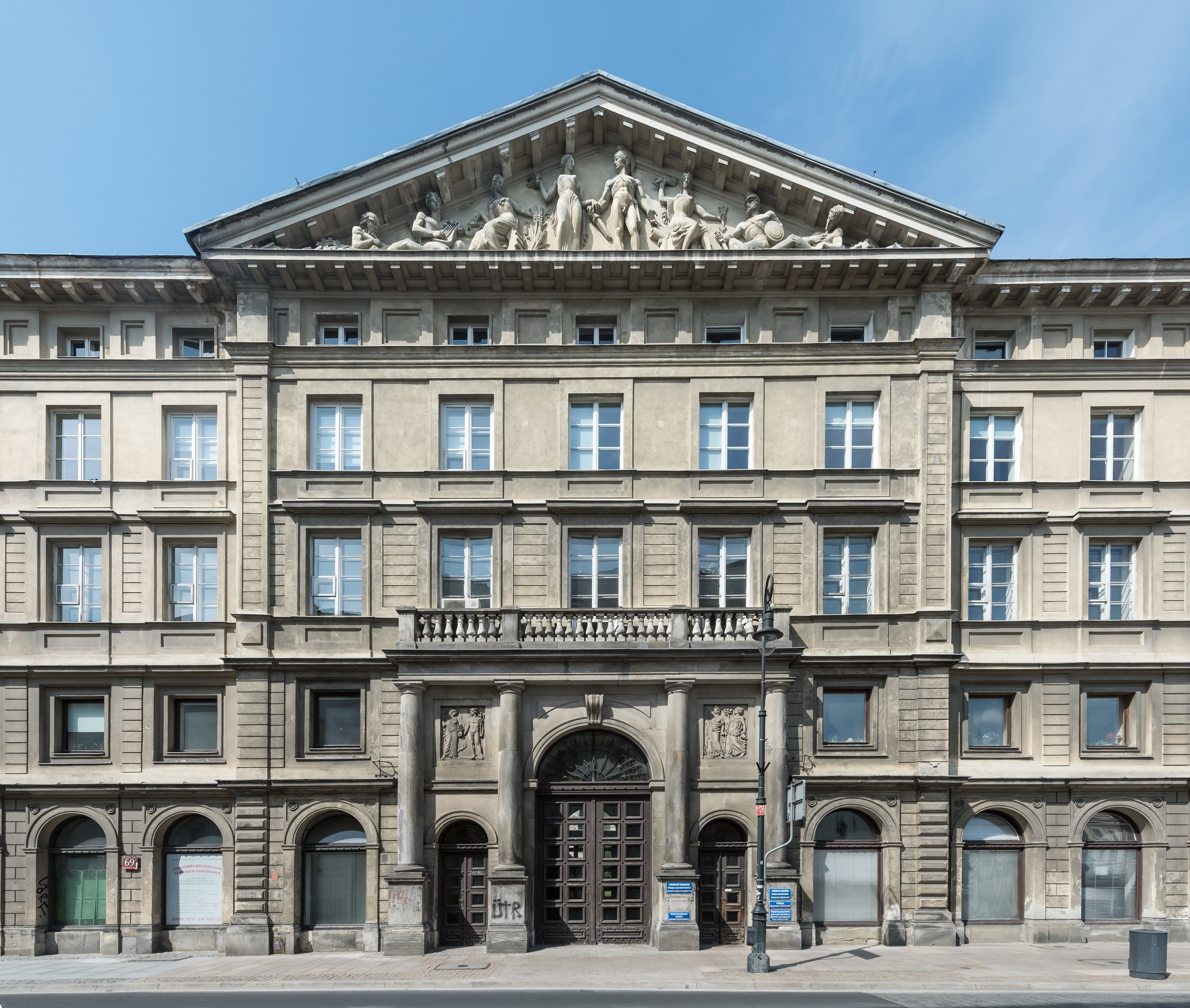
Zamoyski Palace, Warsaw

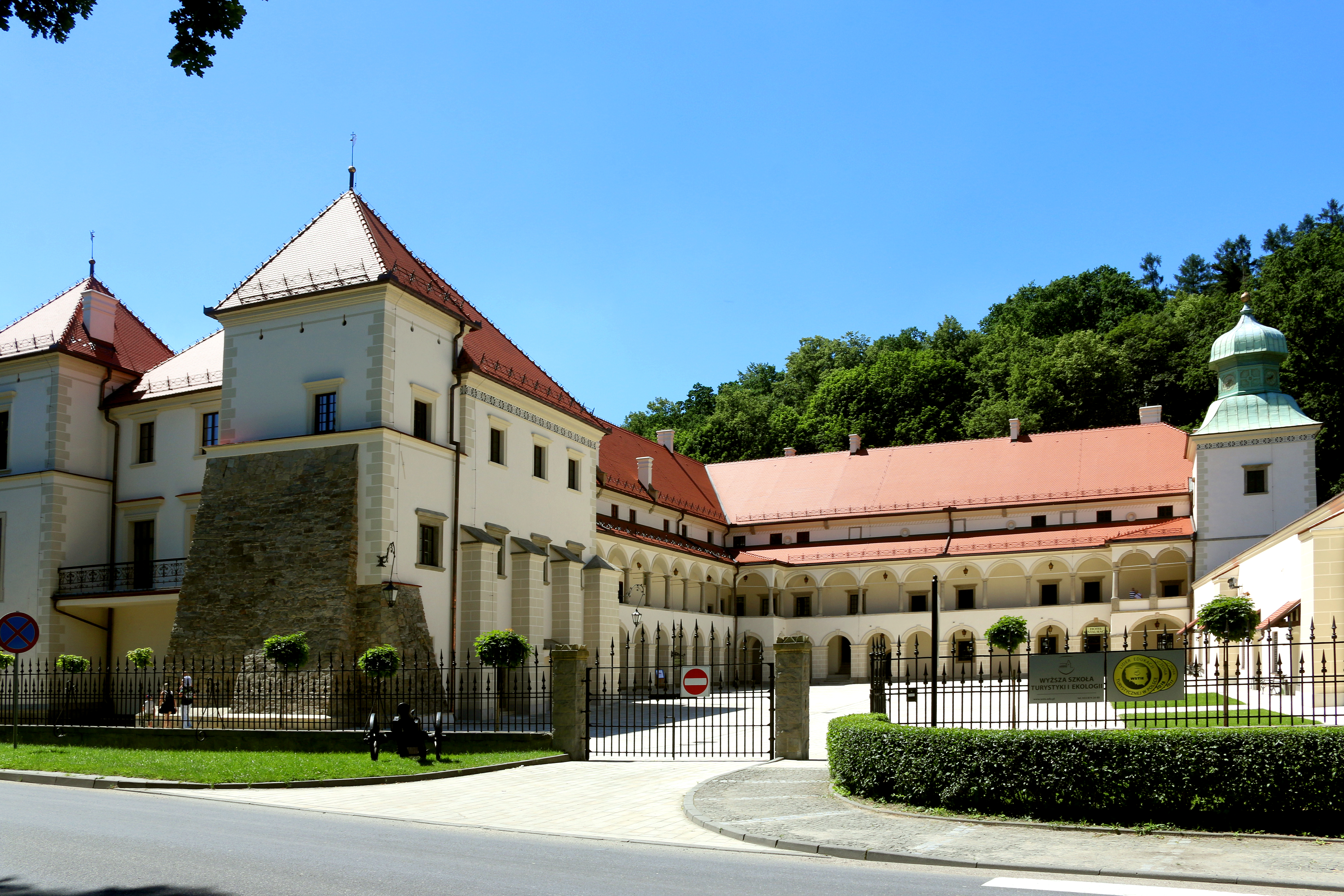
Sucha Beskidzka Castle

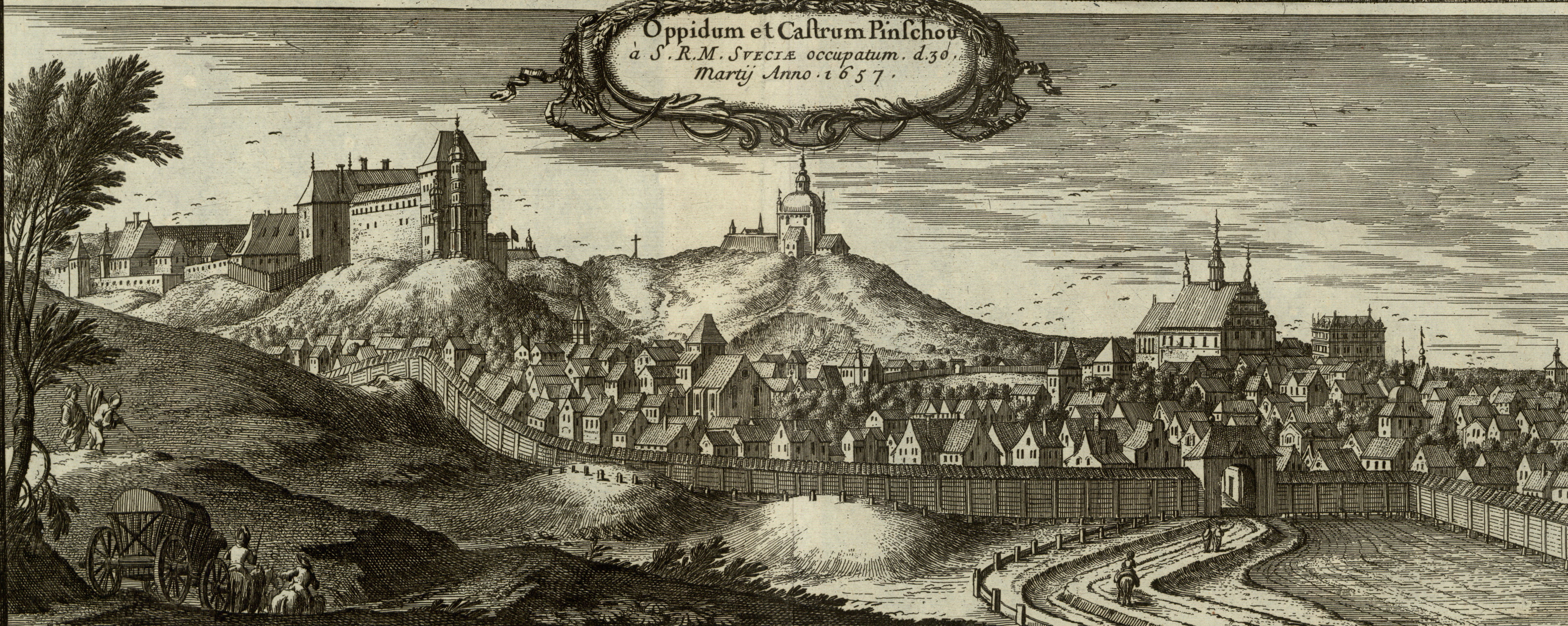
Old Castle in Pińczów (only a pavilion remains today)

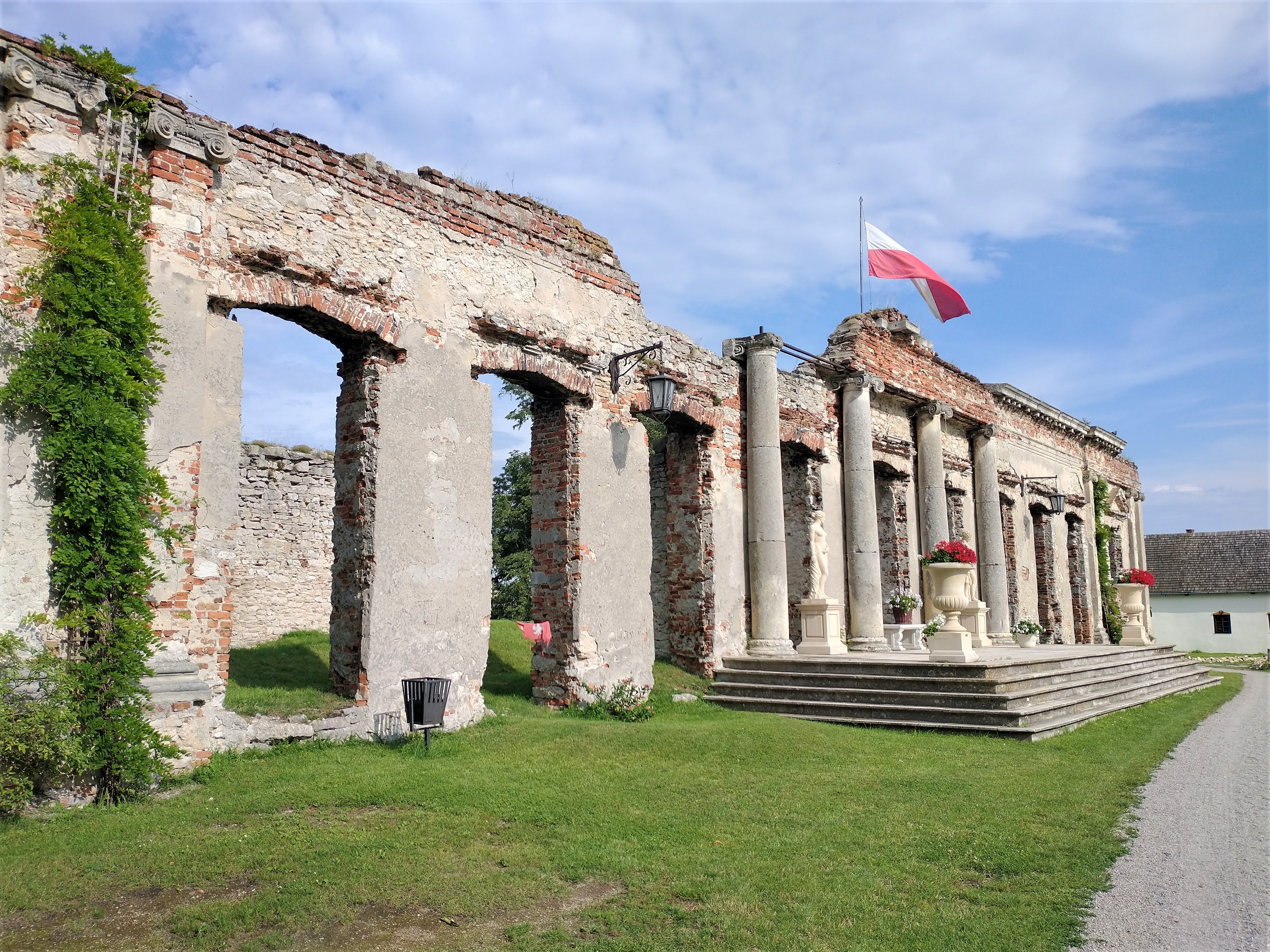
Ruins of the Knight's Residence in Sobków

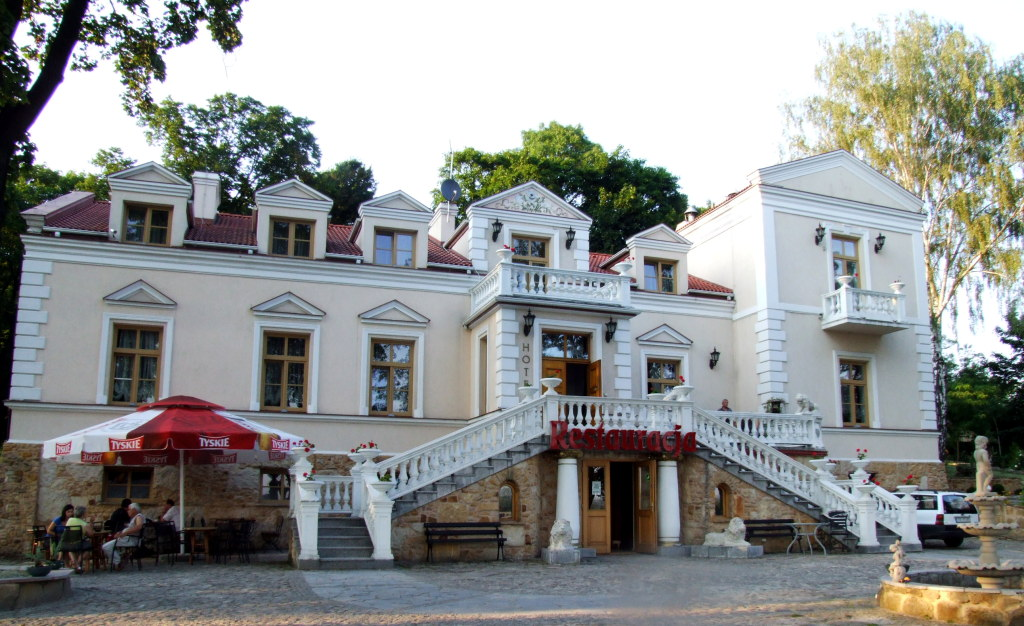
Wielopolski's Hunting Lodge ('Pałac Myśliwski') in Ostrowiec Świętokrzyski

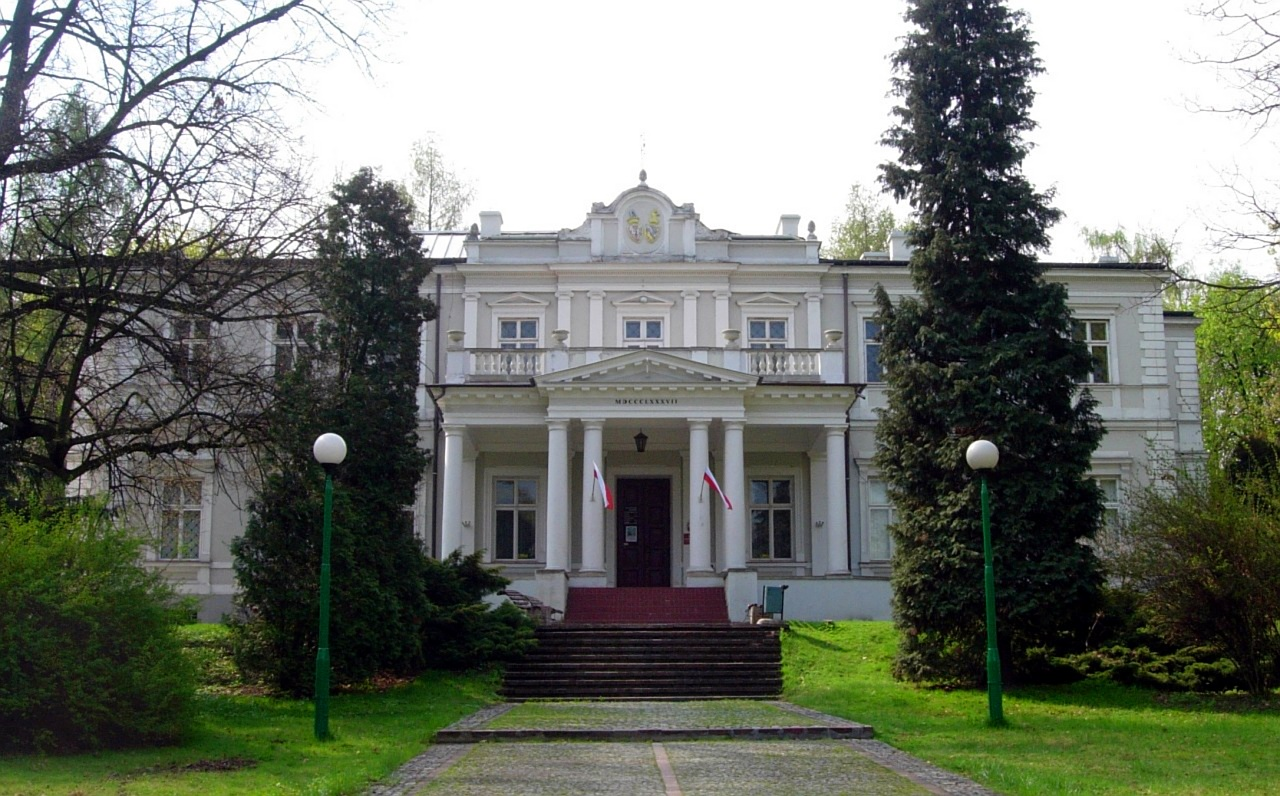
Wielopolski Palace in Ostrowiec Świętokrzyski

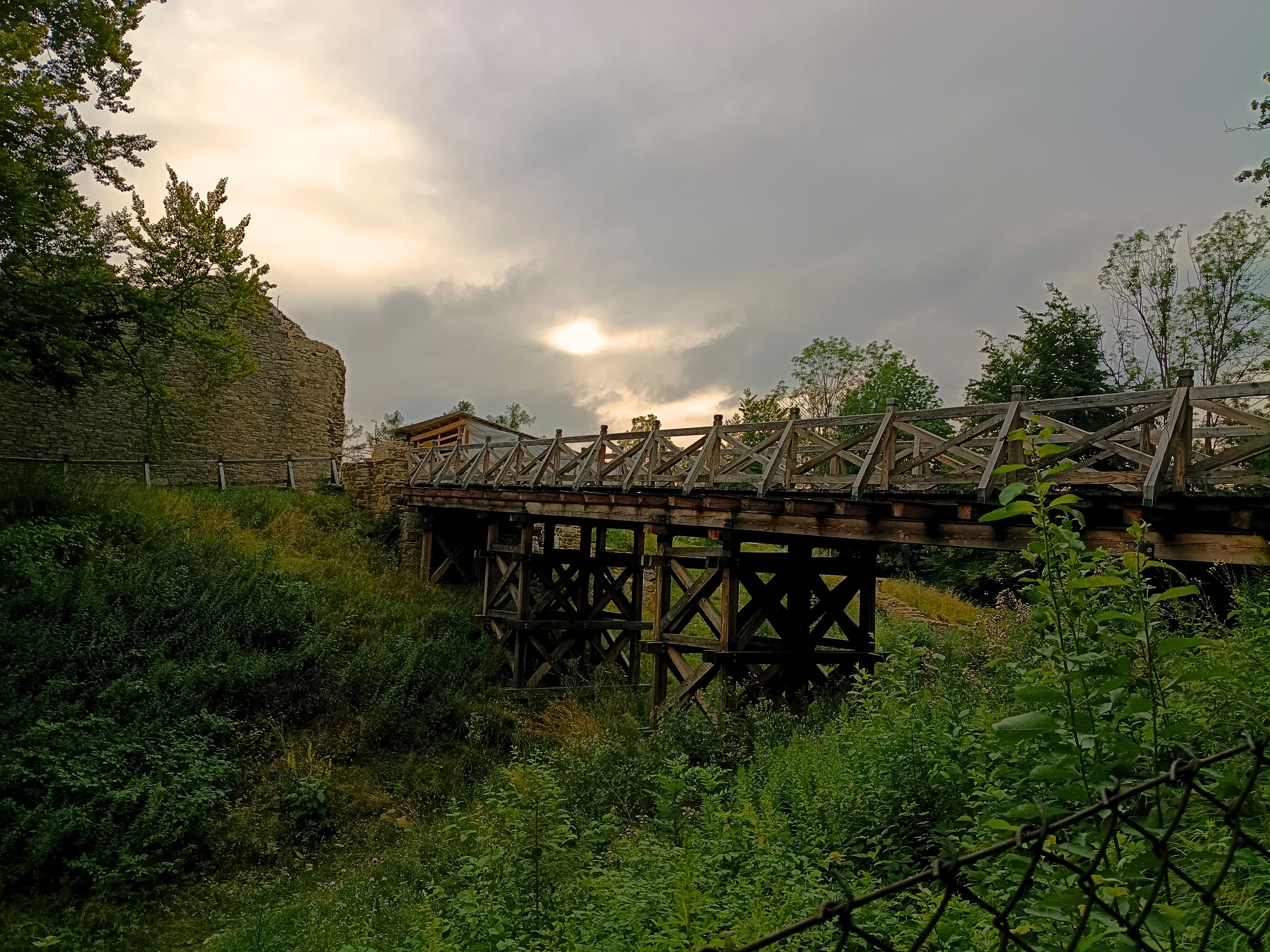
Lanckorona Castle

== See also ==
- Ordynacja Pińczowska
