= Franciszek Wielopolski =

Polish noble (died 1732)

- Count
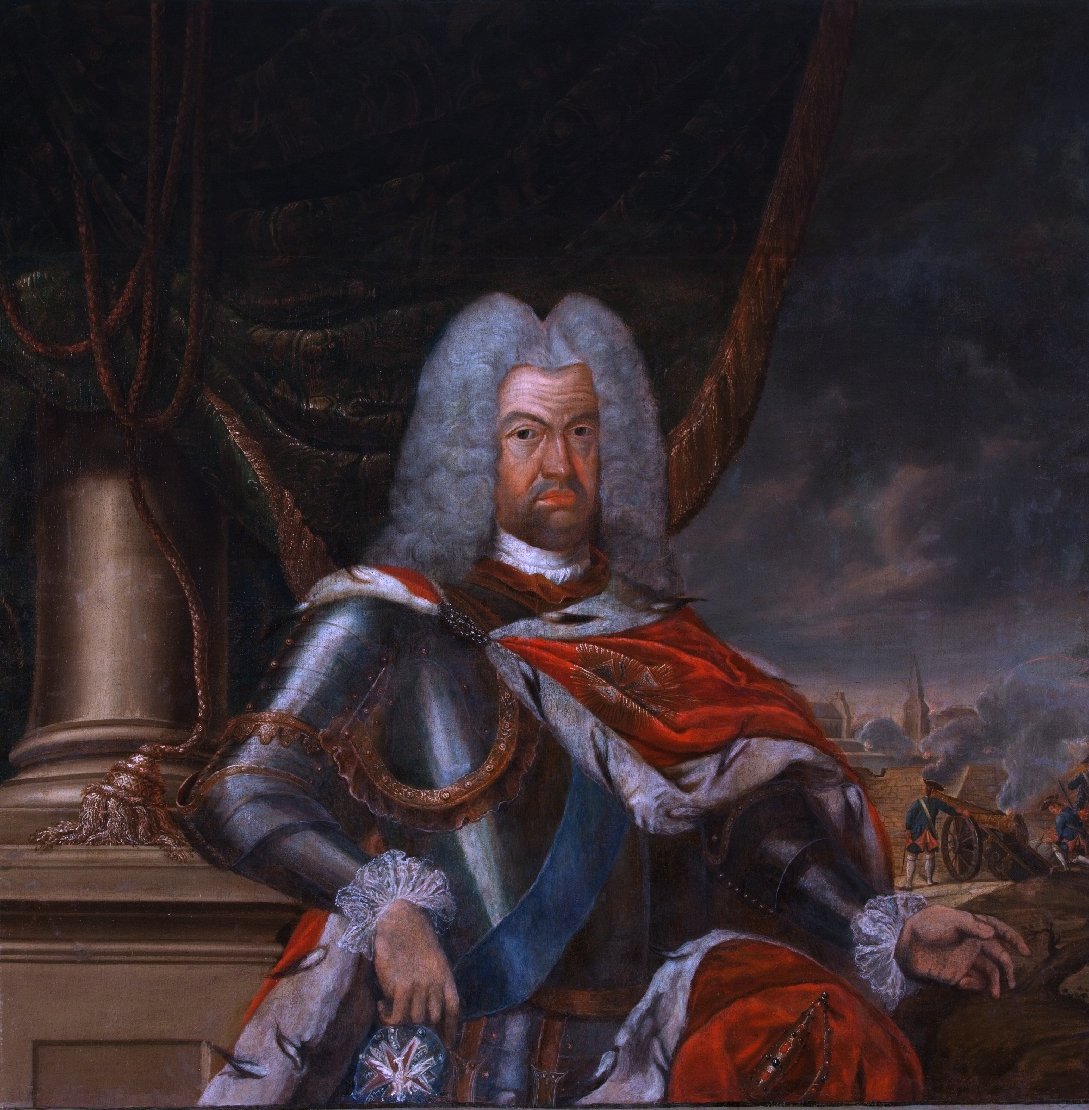
- Coat of arms: Starykoń
- Born: 17th century
- Died: 8 April 1732
- Family: Wielopolski
- Consort: Teresa Magdalena Tarło; Anna Lubomirska
- Issue: with Teresa Magdalena Tarło; Karol Wielopolski; Jan Wielopolski with Anna Lubomirska; Hieronim Wielopolski
- Father: Jan Wielopolski
- Mother: Konstancja Krystyna Komorowska

Count Franciszek Wielopolski (died 8 April 1732) was a Polish noble (szlachcic).

He was the son of Deputy and Grand Chancellor Jan Wielopolski and Konstancja Krystyna Komorowska. He married Teresa Magdalena Tarło and in 1711 Anna Lubomirska, the daughter of Court Marshal and Hetman Hieronim Augustyn Lubomirski.

He was General starost of Kraków from 1688, Wielkorządca of Kraków from 1708, voivode of Sieradz Voivodship from 1720 and of Kraków Voivodship from 1728.

He was the starost of Bochnia, Żarnowiec, Lanckorona and Lipno.
