= Jan Wielopolski =

Polish nobleman, aristocrat, politician and diplomat

Count Jan Wielopolski
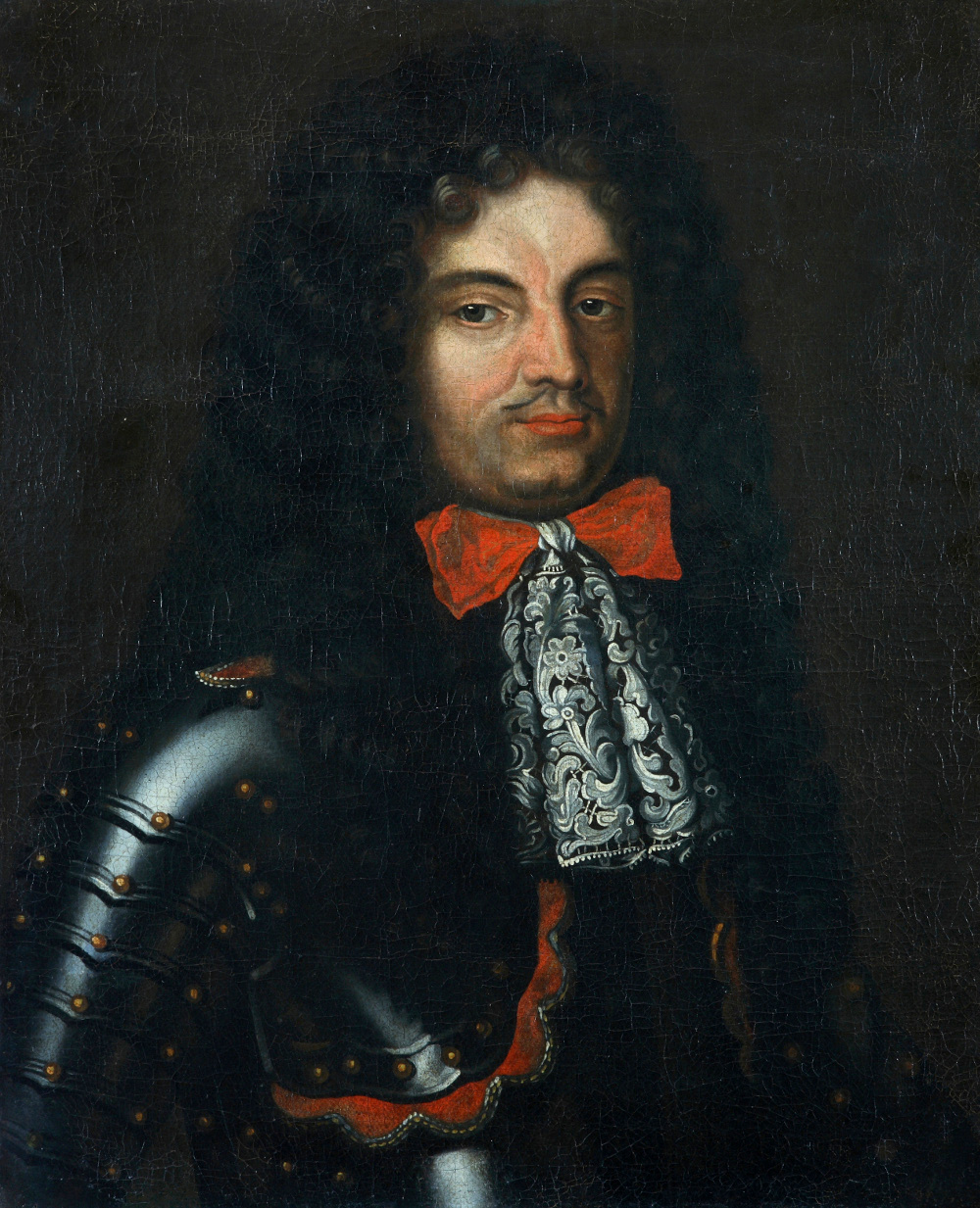

Grand Crown Chancellor
- In office 1678–1688
- Monarch: John III Sobieski
- Preceded by: Jan Stefan Wydżga
- Succeeded by: Jerzy Albrecht Denhoff

Vice Crown Chancellor
- In office 1677–1679
- Monarch: John III Sobieski
- Preceded by: Jan Stefan Wydżga
- Succeeded by: Jan Małachowski

Personal details
- Born: 1630
- Died: 15 February 1688 (aged 57–58)
- Spouse(s): Aniela Febronia Koniecpolska; Konstancja Krystyna Komorowska; Marie Anne d'Arquien
- Children: Franciszek Wielopolski; Ludwik Jan Wielopolski; Konstancja Krystyna Wielopolska; Jan Kazimierz Wielopolski; Jan Józef Wielopolski; Maria Teresa Wielopolska
- Parent(s): Jan Wielopolski (father); Zofia Kochanowska (mother)
- Noble family: Wielopolski

Count Jan Wielopolski (c. 1630-1688) was a Polish nobleman, aristocrat, politician and diplomat. Between May 1678 and January 1680, he was also a Polish chancellor.

== Biography ==
Son of castellan and voivode Jan Wielopolski and Zofia Kochanowska. He was married to Aniela Febronia Koniecpolska and Konstancja Krystyna Komorowska since 1665. His third wife Marie Anne de la Grande d'Arquien, the sister of Queen Marie Casimire Louise he married in July 1678 in Lwów.

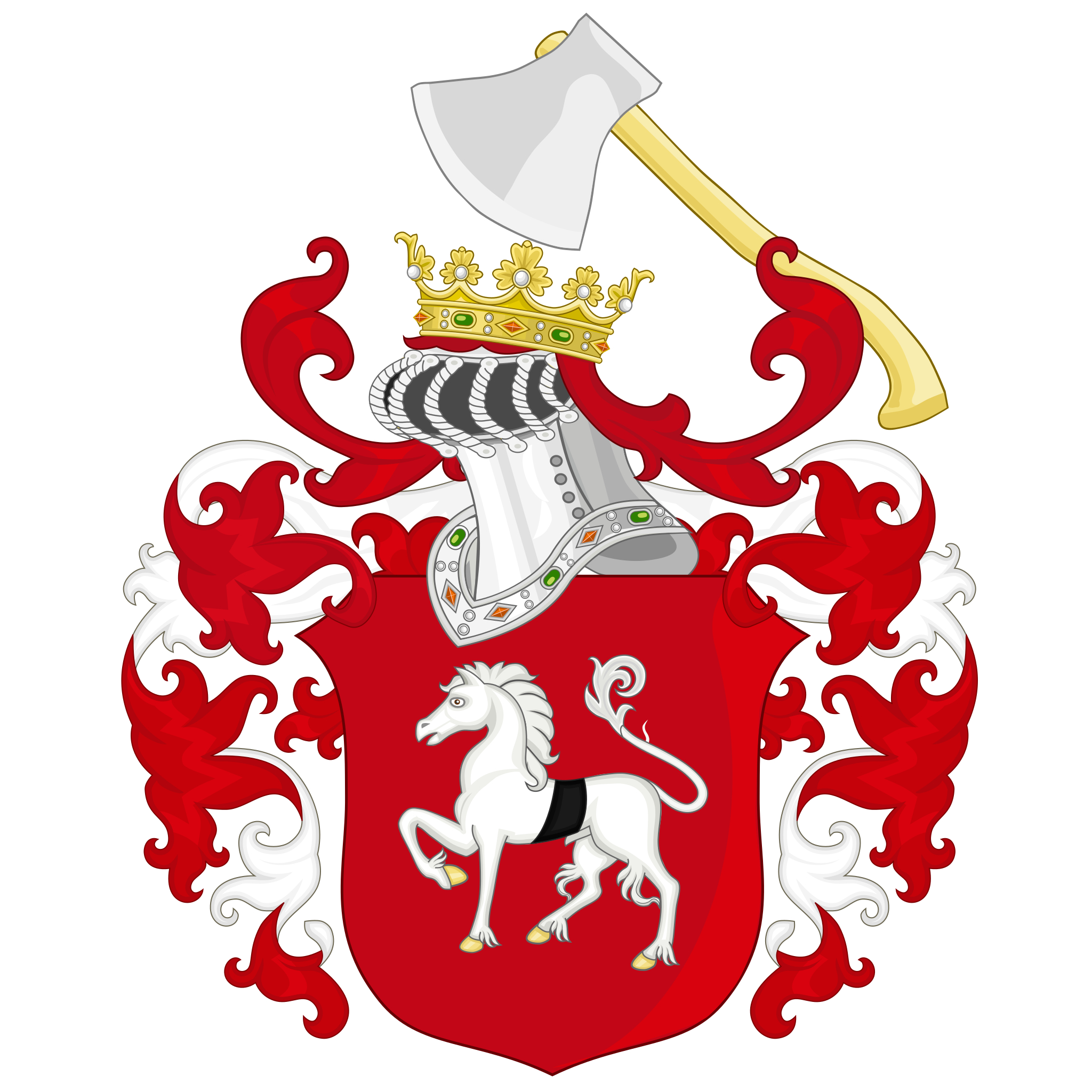
Starykoń coat of arms

He was Stolnik of the Crown since 1664, General governor of Kraków since 1667, Deputy Chancellor the Crown since 1677 and Grand Chancellor of the Crown since 1678.

Wielopolski was the governor of Biecz, Bochnia, Nowy Targ and Dolina.

Educated in Kraków and Strasbourg. Since 1661 frequent deputy to the Sejm from Little Poland province.

He supported King John II Casimir of Poland who wanted to institute an "election vivente rege", where the king's successor was elected before the old king died. This would allow for the king to have input in the election, giving him more power.

Wielopolski was Marshal of the extraordinary Sejm in Warsaw on 20 February - 1 May 1662.

At the end of his life he was in opposition to King John III Sobieski.

His marriage to Konstancja Krystyna Komorowska led to the Wielkopolski family acquiring extensive estates in the following generation, which occurred in 1729.
