= Mirów Castle in Książ Wielki =

Polish castle

Mirów Castle
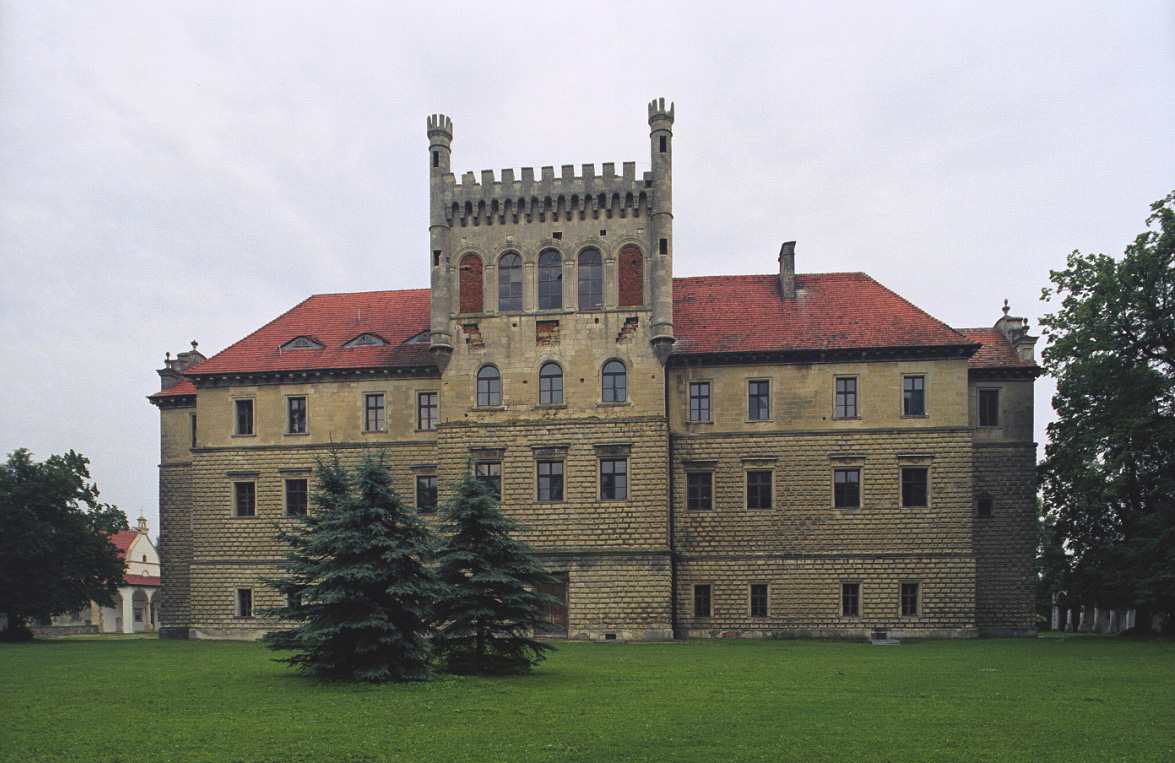
- Mirów Castle

- Location of the Mirów Castle in Poland
- 50°26′25″N 20°08′57″E
- Location: Książ Wielki, Lesser Poland, in Poland

History
- Built: 1585-1595

Site notes
- Architectural style: Renaissance

Mirów Castle is a castle located in Książ Wielki which currently housing the Wincenty Witos Institution and an Agricultural School. There is a museum in the castle. The castle is located in Książ Wielki, Lesser Poland Voivodeship; in Poland.

The castle was the residence of the House of Myszkowski. It was designed and built in between 1585-1595 by Santi Gucci, by an order of the Bishop of Kraków Piotr Myszkowski. During the first quarter of the eighteenth century, the castle went into the hands of the Wielkopolski family, and was reconstructed in a Baroque style.

The castle is part of a tourist trail and program called the Trail of the Renaissance in Lesser Poland (Szlak Renesansu w Małopolsce, Polish), made by the Association of Justus Ludwik Decjusz.

In 1601 the Pińczów Estate was founded and the "Na Mirowie" palace (the name derived from the older seat of the Myszkowskis in Mirów) served as one of its main seats. In 1729, after the Myszkowskis died out, the palace and the estate was passed into the hands of the Wielopolski family.
