= St. Anne's Chapel, Pińczów =

Chapel in Pińczów, Poland

Coordinates: 50°31′14″N 20°31′36″E

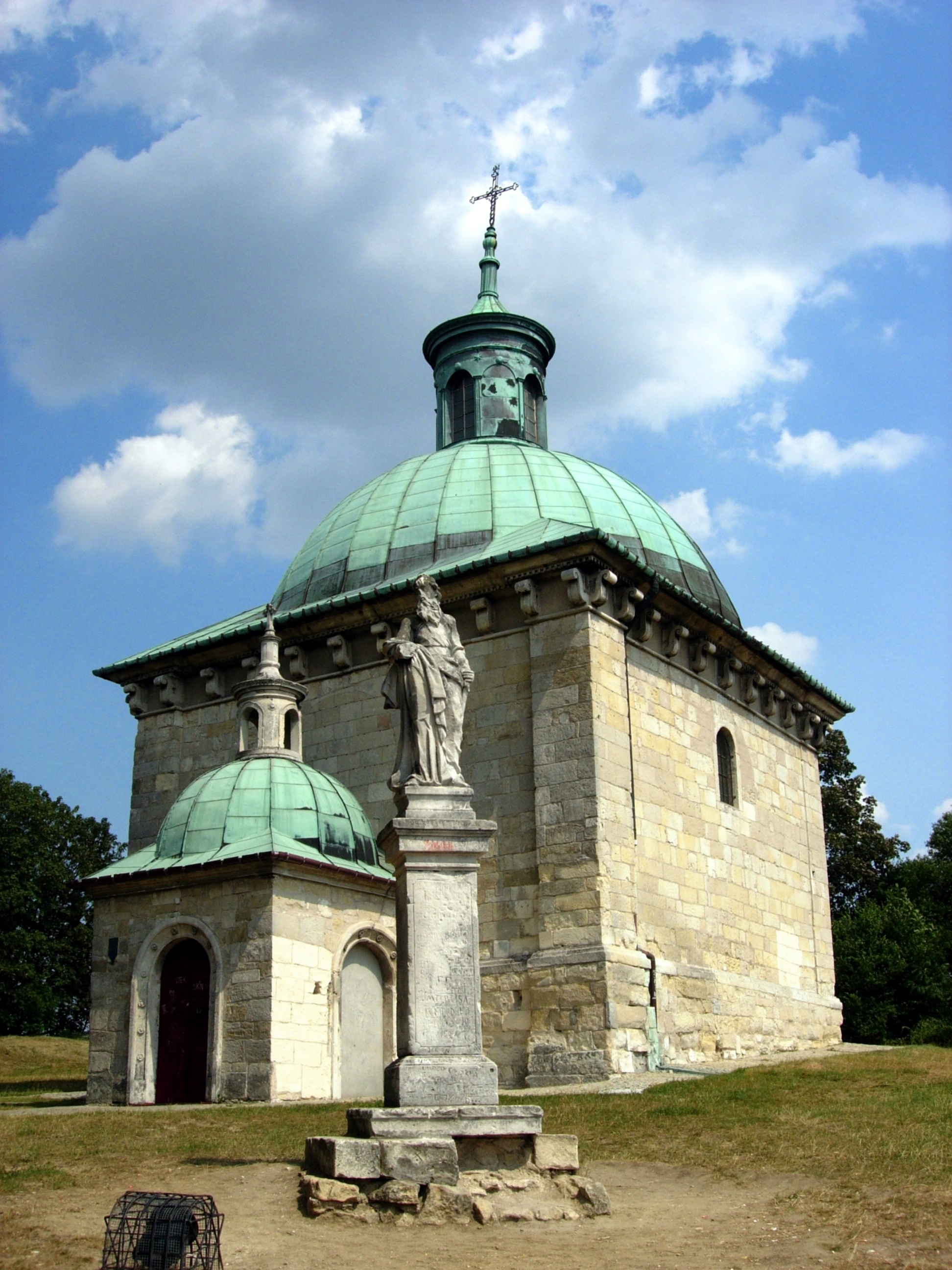
St Anne's Chapel in Pińczów

St Anne's Chapel (Polish: Kaplica św. Anny w Pińczowie) is a chapel in the city of Pińczów in Poland. It was designed by Santi Gucci and built in 1600, on the slopes of the St. Anne's Hill overlooking the town. Rectangular in shape, the chapel is a distinctive example of mannerist architecture, the temple was financed by a local noble, Zygmunt Myszkowski. Covered with a cupola, the chapel's porch is covered with its exact — yet smaller — copy. At the time of its foundation, the chapel was surrounded with walls and constituted a fortified outpost of the Pińczów castle.
