= Old Castle in Żywiec =

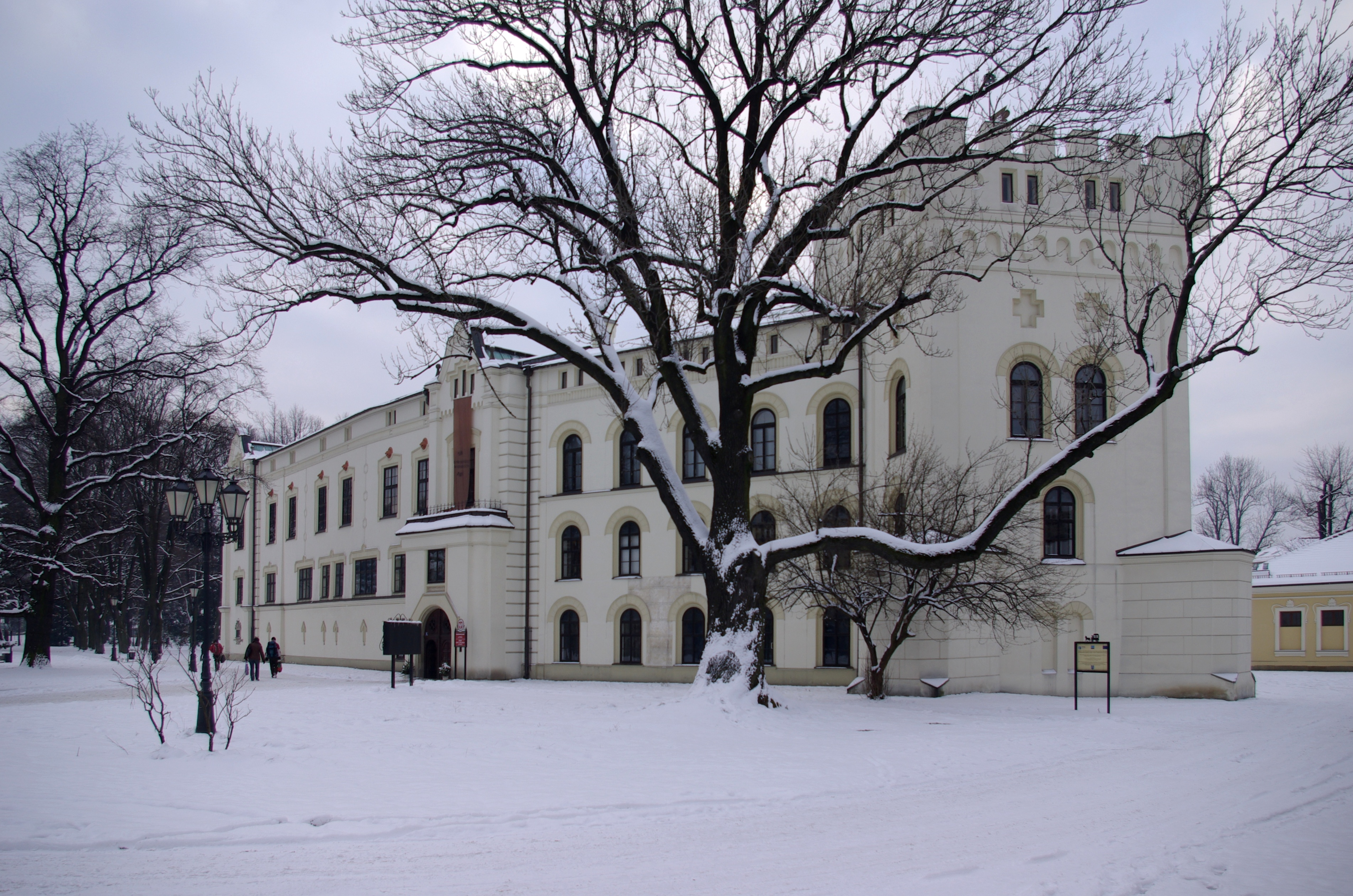
- Old Castle in Żywiec

- Location of the Old Castle in Poland
- 49°41′16″N 19°11′59″E

History
- Built: 16th century

Site notes
- Architectural styles: Gothic; Renaissance

Old Castle in Żywiec (Polish: Stary zamek w Żywcu) is a castle located in Żywiec, Silesian Voivodeship, Poland.

== History ==
A castle (cum castro) in Żywiec was first mentioned in 1467, as destroyed by an army, under Casimir IV Jagiellon's command against the House of Komorowski, with the Korczak Coat of Arms, recorded by Jan Długosz. However it is not certain whether it denoted the castle in the town or a fortifications on a nearby Grójec hill. Archaeological scrutiny dates the origins of the castle in the first half of the 15th century. A later expansion was constructed in 1567 by the House of Komorowski. Under the ownership and will of Jan Spytek Komorowski, during the castle's expansion a Renaissance style courtyard was built, which is still untouched in its current form.

In 1678 the castle was purchased by the Wielopolski family. At the start of the 18th century the Wielopolski owners significantly expanded the castle complex by installing a fountain, Italian park, stable and a herbarium. The castle also saw an additional wing being constructed by the Wielopolski family and the renovations of the castle and expansion of it are documented by Andrzej Komoniecki in his Chronography or History of Żywiec.

In April 1945, soldiers of the Soviet Red Army were stationed in the castle.

Since 2005, the Old Castle in Żywiec hosts the City Museum in Żywiec (Muzeum Miejskie w Żywcu, Polish). The Old Castle's permanent exhibition includes an ethnographical exhibition - which completes the Wooden Architecture Trail in the Silesian Voivodeship, in Poland.
