= Jan Wielopolski (1700–1774) =

Polish nobleman

Count Jan Wielopolski
- Coat of arms: Starykoń
- Born: c. 1700
- Died: 12 March 1774
- Family: Wielopolski
- Consort: Marianna Jabłonowska
- Issue: Jan Józef Wielopolski; Felicja Wielopolska; Salomea Wielopolska; Elzbieta Marianna Wielopolska
- Father: Franciszek Wielopolski
- Mother: Teresa Magdalena Tarło

Jan Wielopolski (c. 1700–12 March 1774) was a Polish nobleman (szlachcic) who served as a Voivode of Sandomierz from 1750 to 1774 and as a Deputy to the Sejm of the Polish–Lithuanian Commonwealth.

== Biography ==
Jan was born circa 1700 and is the son of Franciszek Wielopolski, a member of the Wielopolski noble family and Teresa Tarłówna.

He was a deputy of the Duchy of Zator to the Sejm in the year 1728, as a deputy of the Duchies of Oświęcim and Zator he signed the Pacta conventa of King Stanisław Leszczyński in 1733.

He is also known to be an elector of Stanisław August Poniatowski in the 1764 Polish–Lithuanian royal election in which as he did in 1733 signed the pacta conventa of the elected monarch.

Jan became Crown Great Cupbearer, Voivode of Sandomierz from 1750 to 1774, Starost of Lanckorona and Zagoje.

== Honours and awards ==
He was made a Knight of the Order of the White Eagle.
