= Zamoyski Palace, Warsaw =

Historic building in Warsaw, Poland

Zamoyski Palace
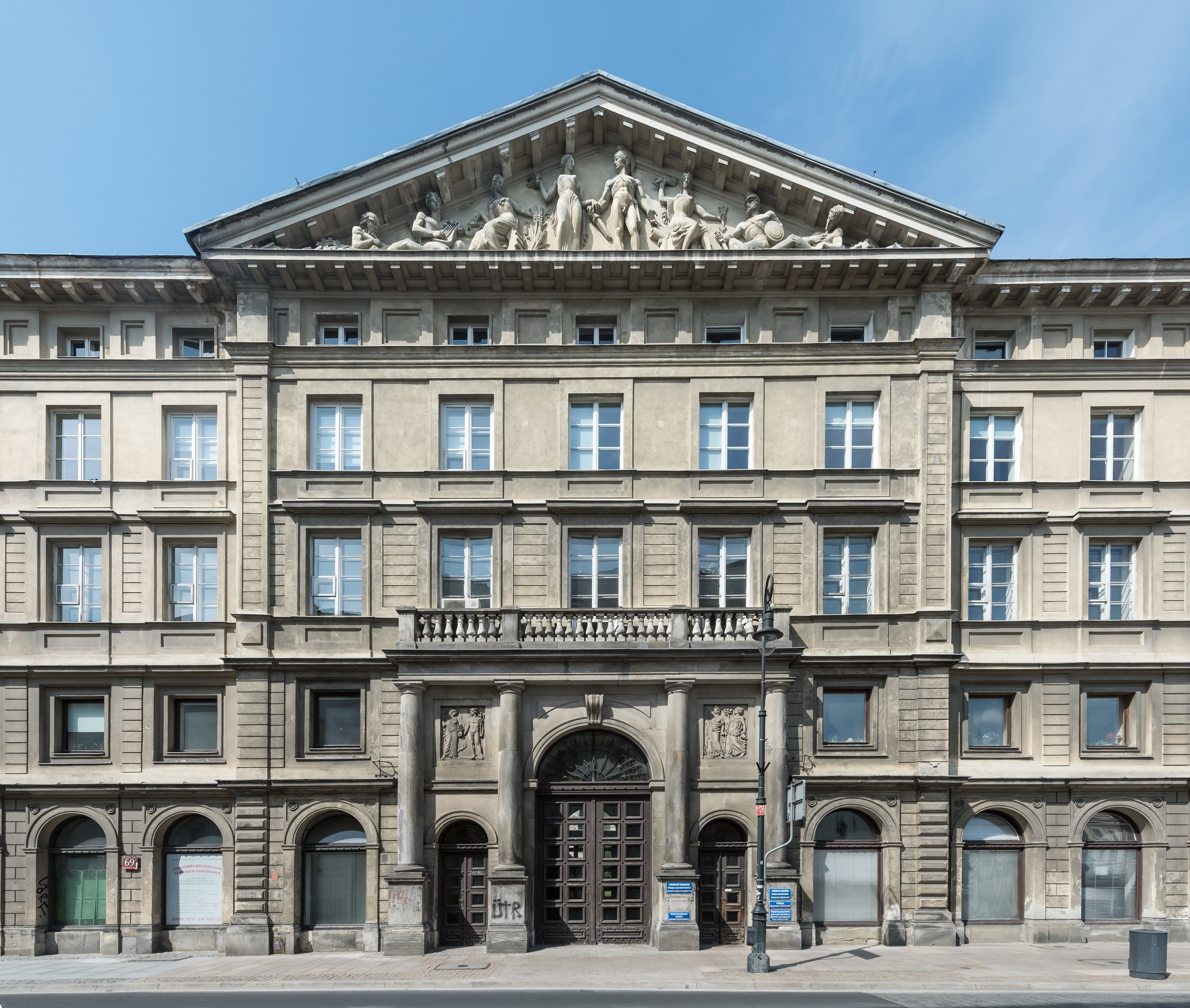
- Corps de logis

- Location of Zamoyski Palace in Poland
- 52°14′14″N 21°01′03″E
- Location: Warsaw, Masovian Voivodeship; in Poland

History
- Built: 1667

Site notes
- Architect: Piotr Hiż
- Architectural style: Renaissance Revival

Historic Monument of Poland
- Designated: 1994-09-08
- Part of: Warsaw – historic city center with the Royal Route and Wilanów
- Reference no.: M.P. 1994 nr 50 poz. 423

Zamoyski Palace (Polish: Pałac Zamoyskich) - a historical building, located by Nowy Świat Street in Warsaw, Poland.

From 1667 the owner of the plot was Jan Wielopolski. Between 1744 and 1745 the inheritors of Wielopolski's possessions reconstructed the palace following designs of architect Piotr Hiż. The owner of the building soon became Franciszek Ksawery Branicki, who commissioned renovation work under Szymon Bogumił Zug.

In 1802 the palace was bought by Anna Jadwiga Sapieżyna. Stanisław Staszic would live in the palace until he died there in 1826. In 1839 the palace became property of Andrzej Artur Zamoyski. The new owner commissioned reconstruction works headed by architect Enrico Marconi which gave the building's present nature. During the January Uprising of 1863, the house was plundered by the Imperial Army. During the interwar period the building housed the Ministry of Interior and Administration (Poland). The palace was damaged during the Warsaw Uprising and rebuilt between 1948 and 1950 without modifying its architectural design.

Presently, the palace houses the Faculty of Journalism and Politics of the University of Warsaw, the Institute of Applied Social Sciences, "Artes-Liberales" Faculty, Institute for Scientific Information and Bibliographic Studies of the Historical Faculty of the University of Warsaw.

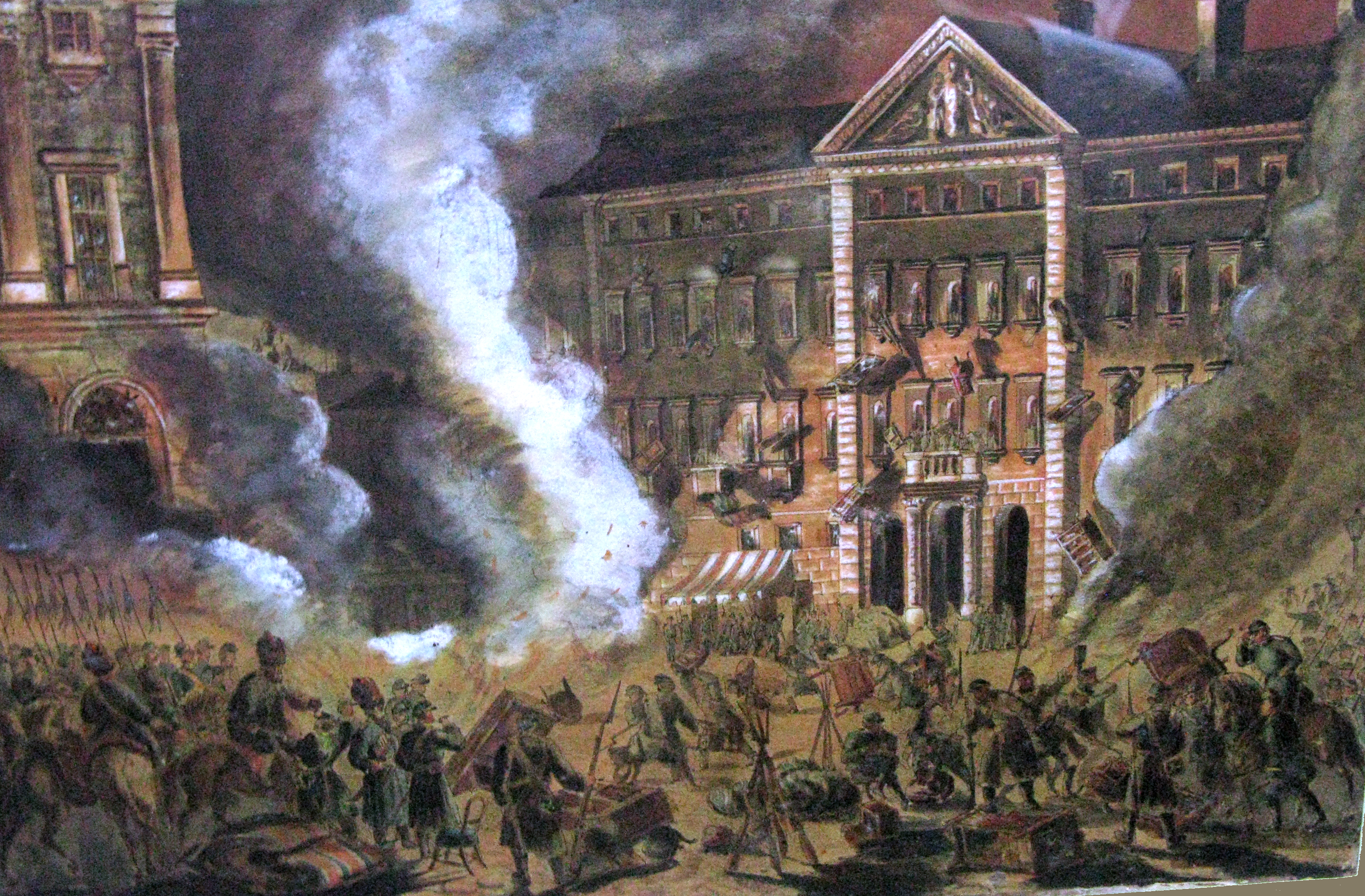
Russian troops pillage the Zamoyski Palace, 1863

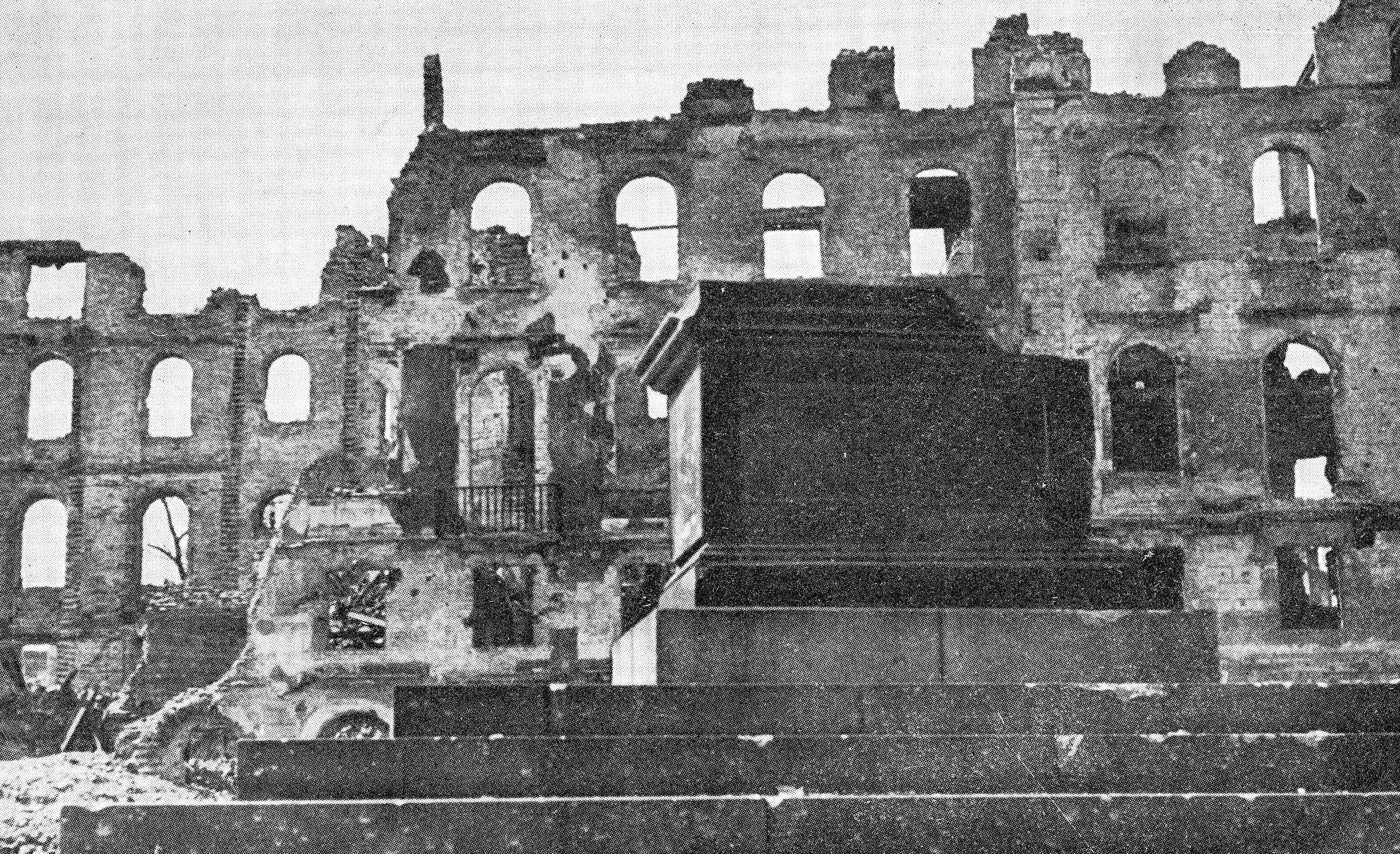
Destruction in 1945 (in foreground, the base of the Copernicus monument)

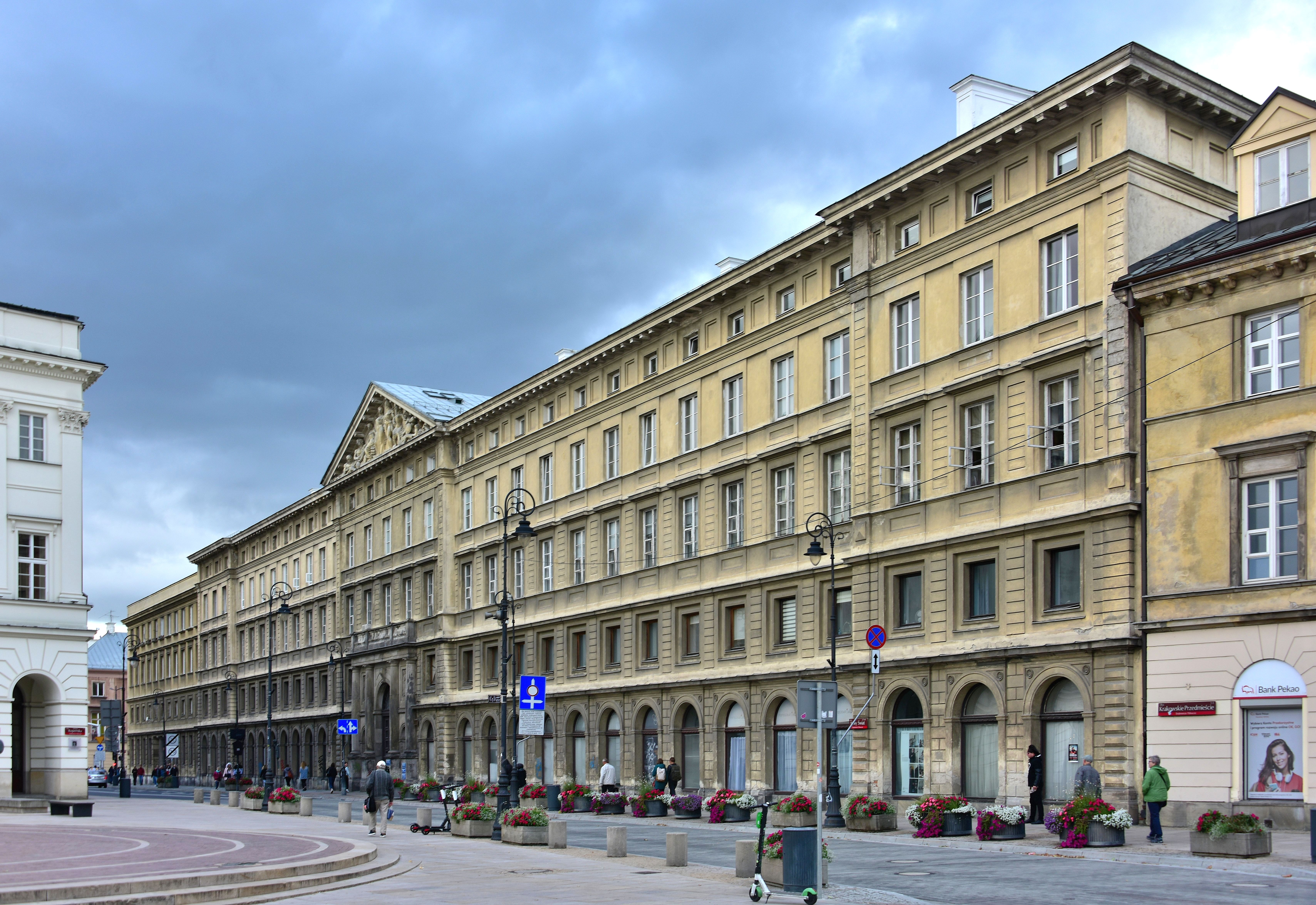
Zamoyski Palace
