= Winów =

- Neighbourhood of Opole
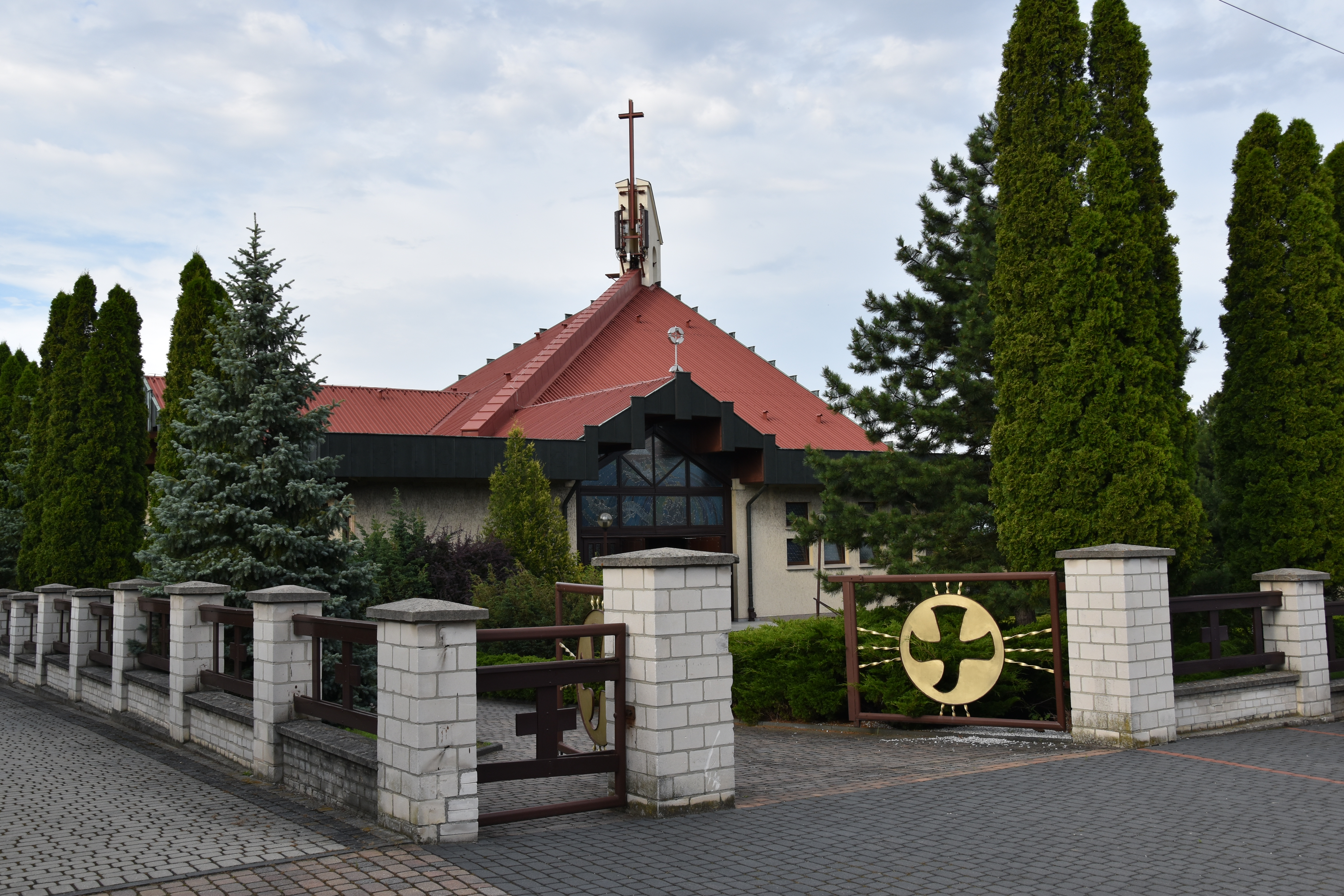
- Holy Spirit church

- Location within Poland
- Coordinates: 50°38′N 17°54′E
- Country: Poland
- Voivodeship: Opole
- City: Opole
- Time zone: UTC+1 (CET)
  - Summer (DST): UTC+2 (CEST)
- Vehicle registration: OP

Winów [ˈvinuf] (German: Winau) is a neighbourhood of Opole in Opole Voivodeship, in southern Poland, located in the southern part of the city.

Before 2017 it was a part of Gmina Prószków.

The name of the district is of Polish origin and comes from the word wino, which means "wine".

== Notable people ==
- Alojzy Liguda (1898–1942), Polish Catholic priest murdered in the Dachau concentration camp, Blessed of the Catholic Church
