= Santi Gucci =

Italian sculptor

Santi (Ognisanti) Gucci
- Born: c. 1530; Florence, Italy (?)
- Died: before 2 February 1600
- Other names: Santy Guczy

Santi (Ognisanti) Gucci (also Polish: Santy Guczy; c. 1530–1600) was an Italian–Polish architect and sculptor.

== Biography ==
He was born around 1530, most likely in Florence, as the son of Giovanni di Niccolò Albenghi Gucci, known as Giovanni della Camilla, a restorer of the Florence Cathedral, and Marietta, daughter of Santi Birbi de S. Gervasio fouri della Porta a Pinti. He trained in his father's workshop and possibly also under Baccio Bandinelli, the master of his half-brother Francesco Camilliani. In Florence, he executed a number of works that have not survived, including a statue of Venus.

He moved to Poland after 1550, and became the court artist of the King Sigismund II Augustus. In 1558, he received payment from the royal treasury, together with another Italian, Galeazzo, for an unknown work. When in 1575 he purchased, together with his wife Katarzyna Górska, half of a townhouse on Grodzka Street in Kraków, he styled himself serenissimi regis murator (lit. 'murator to the Most Serene King'). He most likely received this title shortly after arriving in Poland and retained it until his death, serving successive monarchs. He had no children on his own, but raised the daughters of his wife Katarzyna Górska from her first marriage, Anna and Marta. For his merits for the Polish crown he was ennobled, accepted into the ranks of the szlachta and given a Zetynian Coat of Arms. While in Poland, he Polonized his name, signing in Polish as Santy Guczy.

Santi Gucci's workshop in Pińczów became a notable school that attracted many future artists and became one of the centres of Mannerist art and culture in Poland. One of the most successful and fruitful artists of his epoch, Gucci built or reconstructed a number of palaces of notable people in all parts of Polish-Lithuanian Commonwealth. Among them was the Firlej family castle in Janowiec on the Vistula (1565–1585), for whom he also sculpted a Mannerist tomb in a local parish church (c. 1586). For the Piotr Myszkowski family he erected a new palace in Książ Wielki (1585–1595), Mirów Castle. He also erected the Łobzów palace (1585–1587), in Kraków, and expanded the castle in Pińczów (1591–1600). He is also supposed to be the architect of the Pińczów synagogue.

One of his most notable works is the integral design and funerary monuments in the Bartolommeo Berrecci's Sigismund's Chapel in the Wawel Cathedral. The chapel, often referred to as the pearl of Italian Renaissance north of the Alps, housed the graves of King Sigismund II Augustus and Anna Jagiellon. Between 1594 and 1595 he also refurbished the Mariacka Chapel to house the tomb of Stephen Báthory. Others among his major works include the Branicki family chapel in Niepołomice (1596) and St. Anne's Chapel in Pińczów.

== Gallery ==
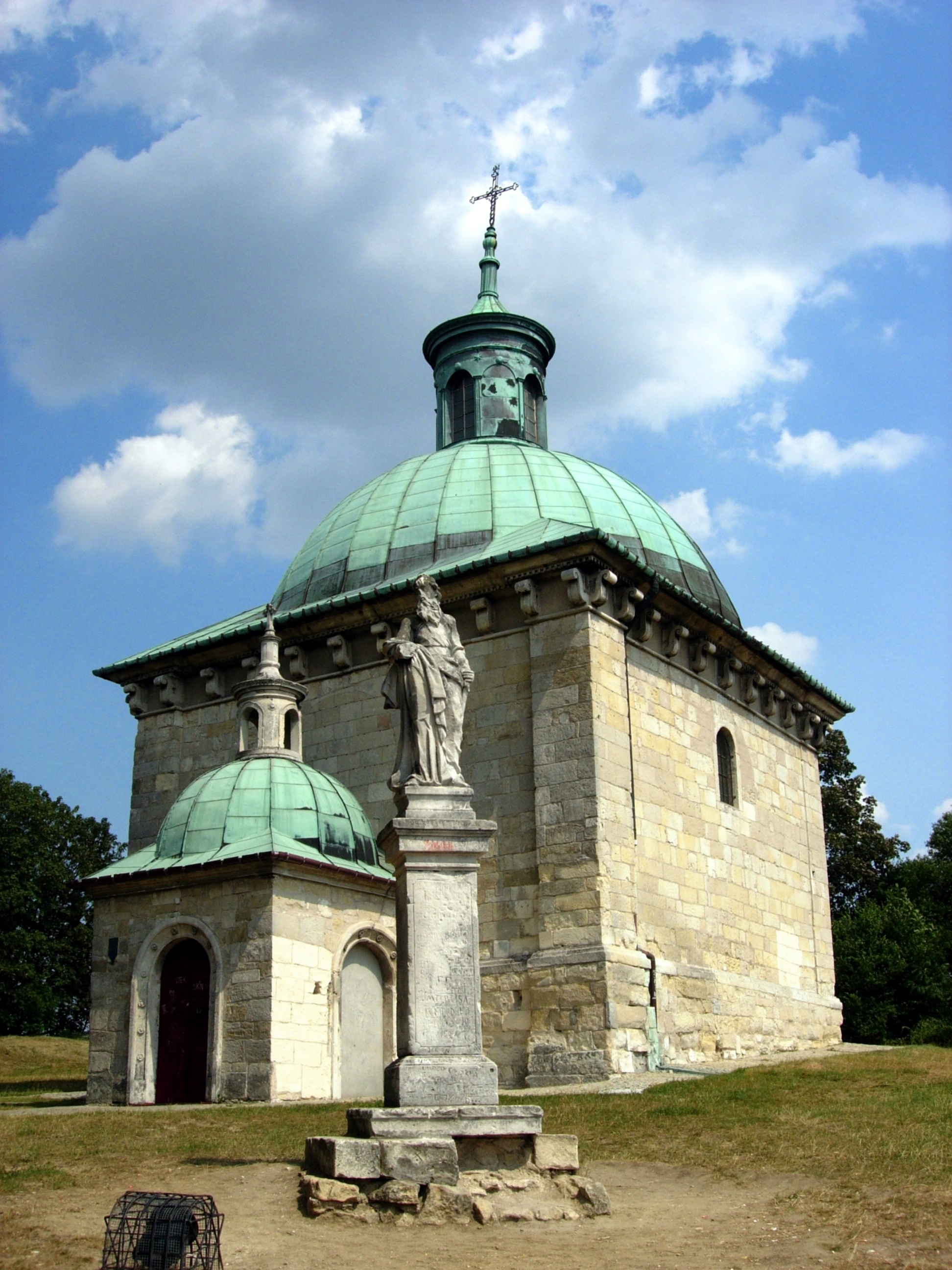
St Anne's Chapel in Pińczów

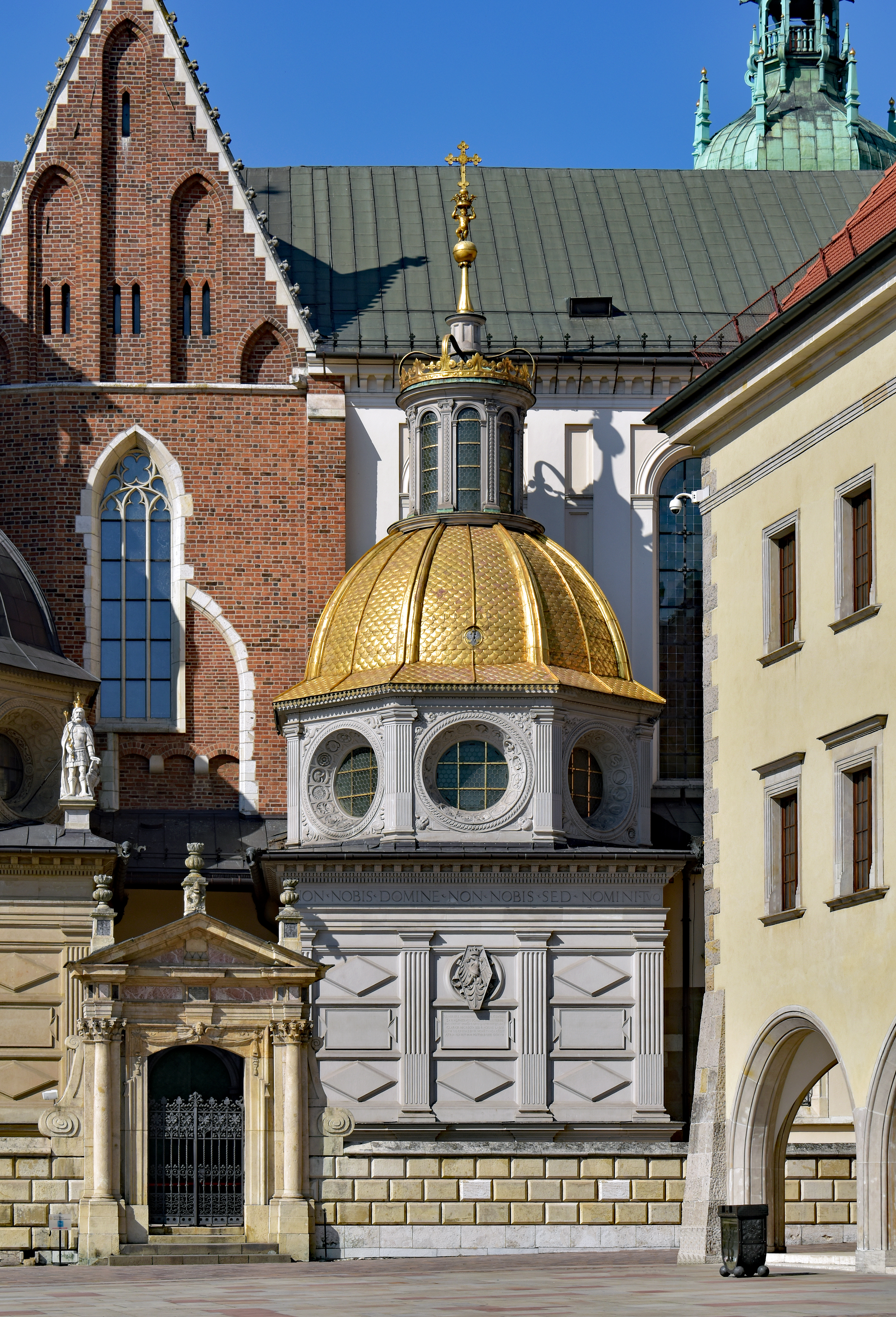
Sigismund's Chapel at the Wawel Cathedral

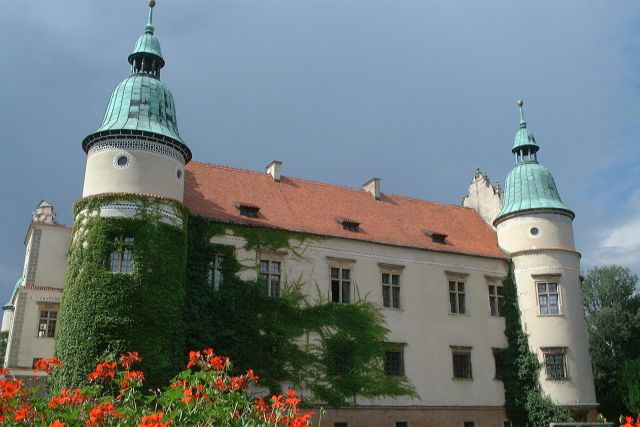
Baranów Sandomierski

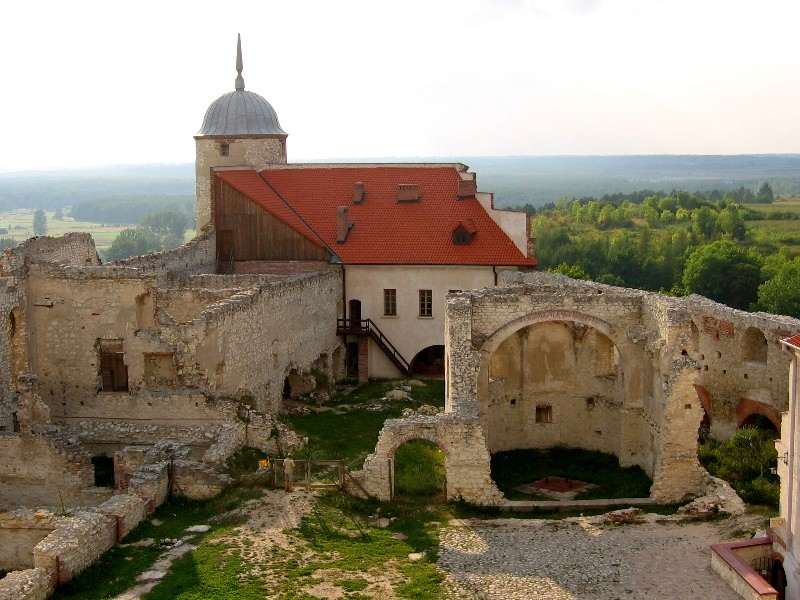
Janowiec

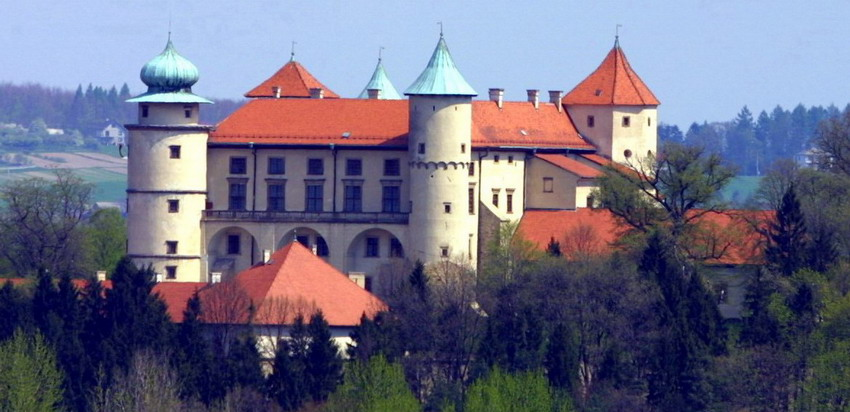
Nowy Wiśnicz

== Bibliography ==
- Fischinger, Andrzej (1969). Santi Gucci, architekt i rzeźbiarz królewski XVI wieku [Santi Gucci, a 16th-century royal architect and sculptor] (in Polish). Kraków.
- Kozakiewicz, H.; S. Kozakiewicz (1976). Renesans w Polsce. Warsaw.
