= St. Anne Hill =

Hill in Pińczów, western Poland

- Wzgórze św. Anny

Highest point
- Elevation: 250 m (820 ft)
- Coordinates: 50°31′20″N 20°31′52″E

Naming
- Language of name: Polish

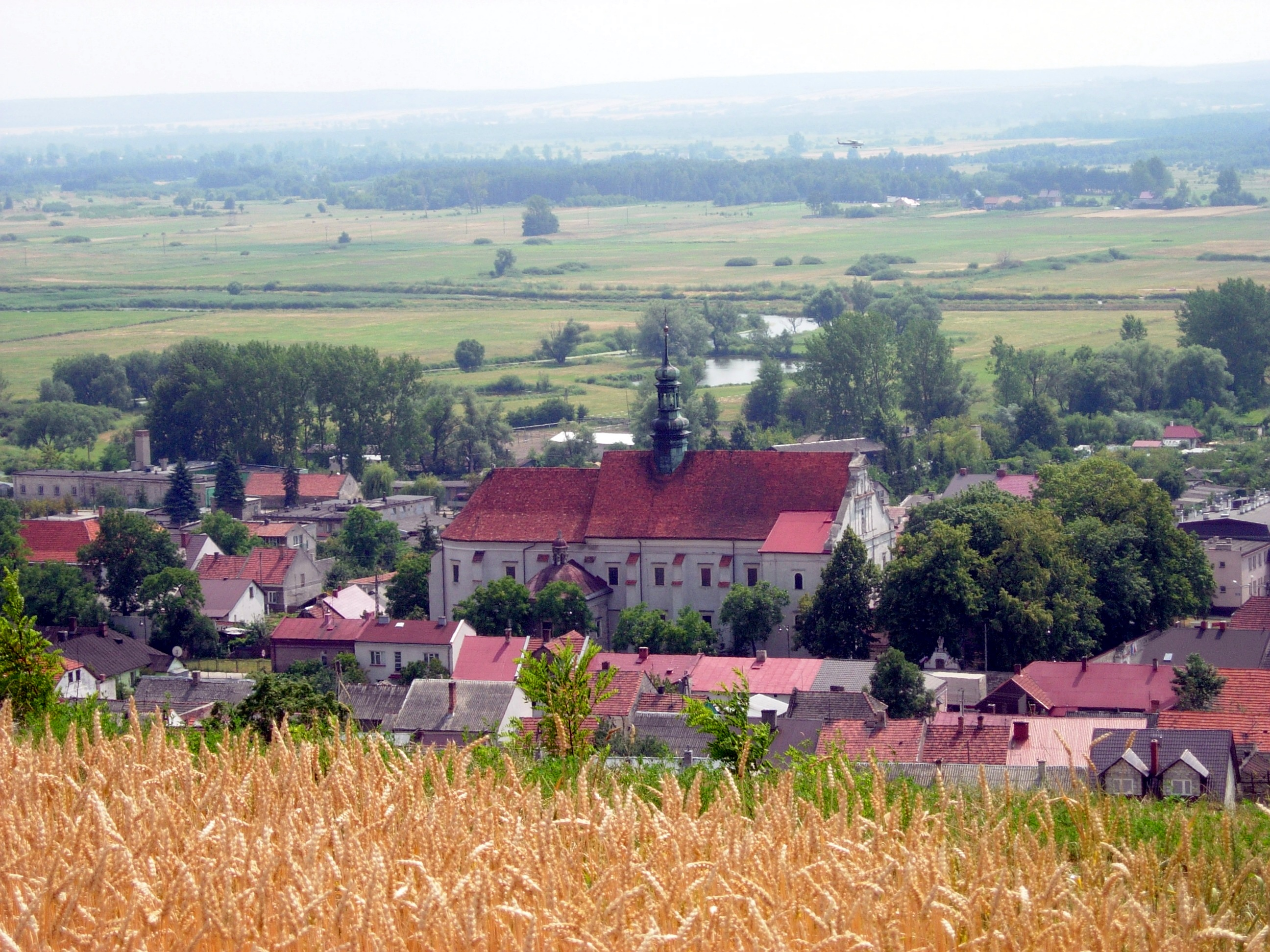
View from St. Anne looking down at the town of Pińczów and the Polish countryside

St. Anne is a hill in Pińczów in western Poland. The Mannerist St. Anne's Chapel is located on this hill.
