= Jan Wielopolski the elder =

Polish noble

Jan Wielopolski
- Count
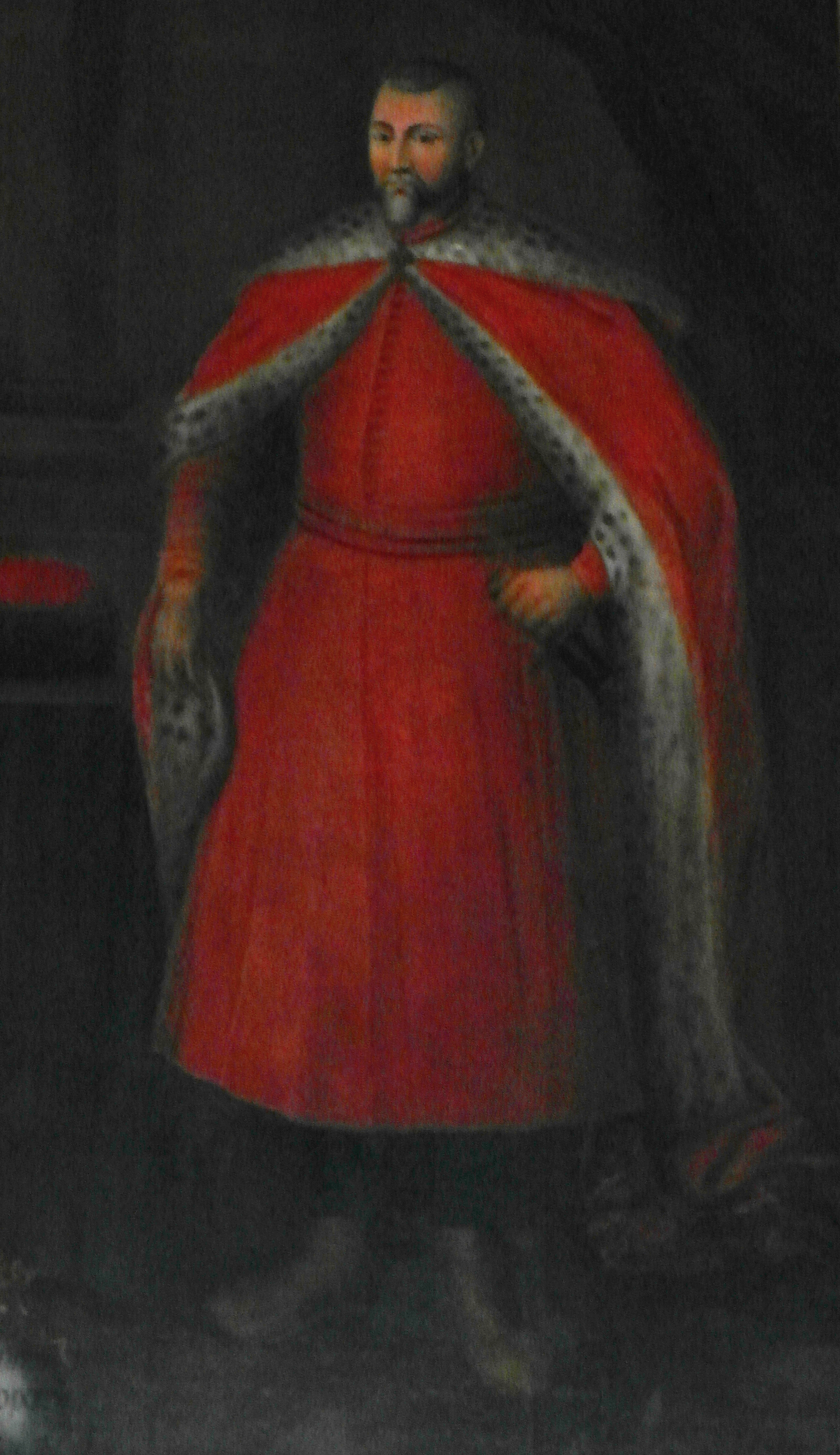
- Jan Wielopolski (d. 1668)
- Coat of arms: Starykoń
- Born: 17th century
- Died: 1668
- Family: Wielopolski
- Consort: Zofia Kochanowska
- Issue: Jan Wielopolski
- Father: Kasper Wielopolski
- Mother: Elżbieta Broniewska

Count Jan Wielopolski (died 1668) was a Polish noble (szlachcic) from the Wielopolski family who served as Voivode of Kraków from 1667 to 1668, Castellan of Wojnicz from 1655 to 1667.

He also served as Starost of Biecz from 1655 to 1639 to 1655 as well as Starost of Nowy Targ in 1652 and Starost of Warsaw in the year 1658.

He was a courtier from 1635, administrator of royal salt-pits in Bochnia from 1649, castellan of Wojnicz from 1655 and voivode of Kraków Voivodship from 1667.

== Personal life ==
Son of District Judge and Podkomorzy Kasper Wielopolski and Elżbieta Broniewska. He was married to Zofia Kochanowska.
