= Andrzej Maria Deskur =

His Eminence Andrzej Maria Deskur
- President of the Pontifical Academy of the Immaculate Conception
- Church: Roman Catholic Church
- Appointed: 24 January 1987
- Term ended: 3 September 2011
- Other post: Cardinal-Priest pro hac vice of San Cesareo in Palatio (1996-2011)
- Previous posts: Vice-Secretary of the Pontifical Commission for the Cinema, Radio and Television (1955-59); Undersecretary of the Pontifical Commission for the Cinema, Radio and Television (1959-64); Vice-Delegate of Vatican Film Library (1960-70); Undersecretary of the Pontifical Commission for Social Communications (1964-70); Secretary of the Pontifical Commission for Social Communications (1970-73); Delegate of the Vatican Film Library (1970-73); President of the Pontifical Commission for Social Communications (1973-84); Titular Bishop of Thenæ (1974-80); Titular Archbishop of Thenæ (1980-85); Cardinal-Deacon of San Cesareo in Palatio (1985-96)

Orders
- Ordination: 20 August 1950 by Pierre-Marie Paul Gerlier
- Consecration: 30 June 1974 by Pope Paul VI
- Created cardinal: 25 May 1985 by Pope John Paul II
- Rank: Cardinal-Deacon (1985-96); Cardinal-Priest (1996-2011)

Personal details
- Born: Andrzej Maria Michał Deskur; 29 February 1924 Deskur Palace, Sancygniów, Gmina Działoszyce, Pińczów, Świętokrzyskie, Second Polish Republic
- Died: 3 September 2011 (aged 87) Palazzo San Carlo, Vatican City
- Buried: Divine Mercy Sanctuary
- Parents: Andrzej Ludwika Deskur; Stanisława Janina z Kosseckich
- Education: Jagiellonian University; Pontifical Academy of Ecclesiastical Nobles
- Coat of arms

Styles of Andrzej Maria Deskur
- Reference style: His Eminence
- Spoken style: Your Eminence
- Informal style: Cardinal
- See: Tene (titular see)

Andrzej Maria Deskur (29 February 1924 – 3 September 2011) was President emeritus of the Pontifical Council for Social Communications and a Cardinal of the Catholic Church.

== Life and career ==
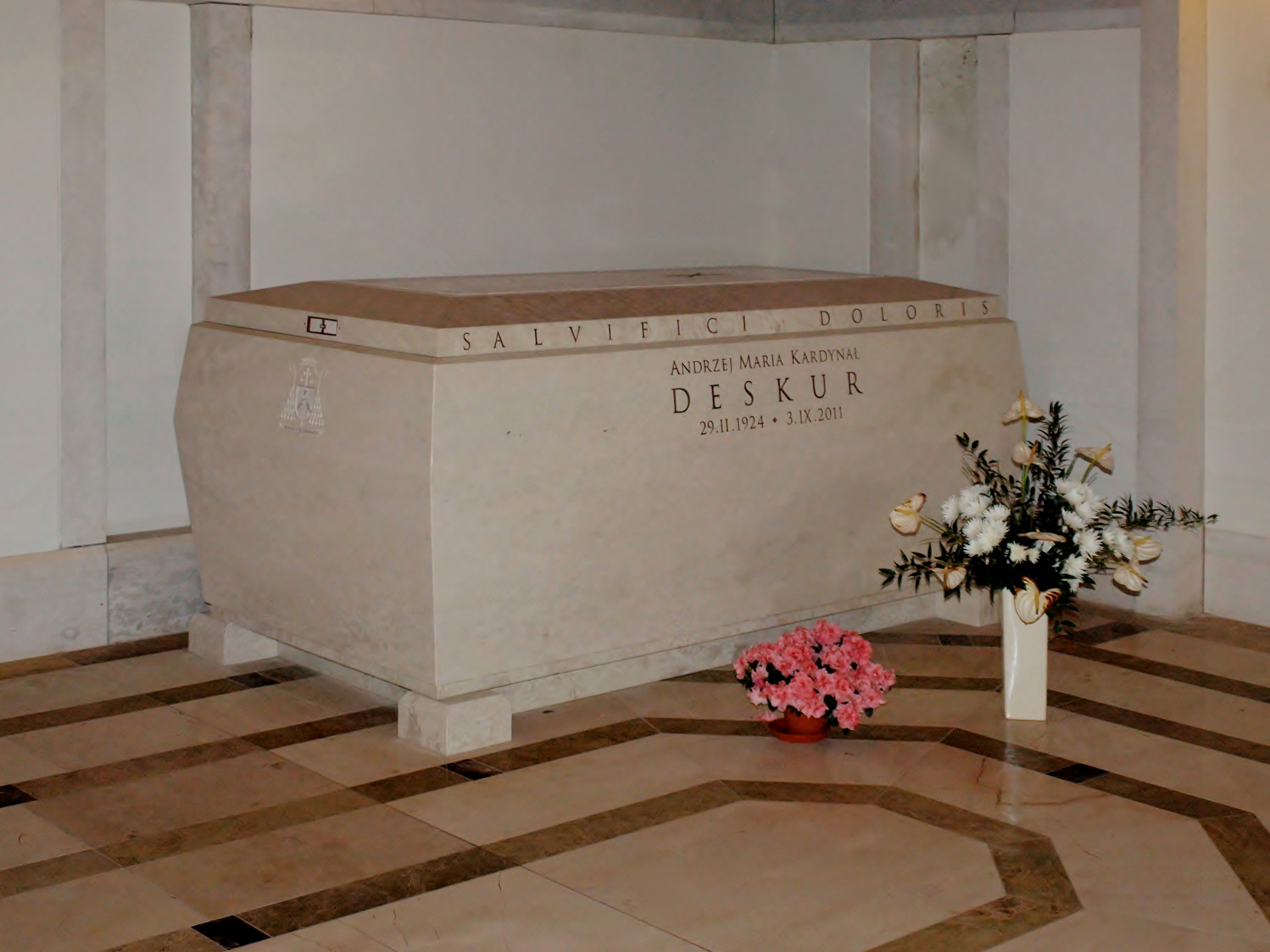
The cardinal's tomb in his native Poland.

Deskur was born in Sancygniów, near Kielce, Poland, the son of Stanisława (Kossecka) and Andrzej Deskur. He received a doctorate in law in 1945 from the Jagiellonian University (study underground). He was the secretary general of the Polish student organization "Bratniak". He entered the seminary in Kraków and was ordained a priest on 20 August 1950. He obtained a doctorate in theology from the University of Freiburg and, after two years of pastoral activity and study in France and Switzerland, in September 1952, he was called to Rome to work in the Secretariat of State. During this period he served as undersecretary of the Pontifical Commission for Cinematography, Radio and Television (1954–1964), secretary of the Preparatory Secretariat for the Press and Entertainment during Vatican II (1960–1962), peritus for the assembly of the council (1962–1965) and was a member of the Conciliar Commissions for Bishops, for the Clergy, for the Laity, and for the Press and Entertainment.

In 1973 he was named president of the Pontifical Commission (now Council) for Social Communications. He was appointed titular bishop of Tene on 17 June 1974 and received episcopal ordination the following 30 June. On 15 February 1980, John Paul II named him Archbishop and president emeritus of the Pontifical Commission.

Deskur was raised to the Cardinalate on 25 May 1985, becoming Cardinal-Deacon of San Cesareo in Palatio, that had belonged to Pope John Paul II himself until his elevation to the Papacy. After ten years as a Cardinal-Deacon he exercised his right and his titular church was elevated and he became Cardinal-Priest. Cardinal Deskur lost the right to participate in the conclave when he turned 80 years old in 2004.

Deskur contributed to numerous congresses and meetings for professionals of the press, radio, television and cinema, visiting about 70 countries on five continents. Among other endeavours, he was one of the promoters of the radio station "Radio Veritas" for countries in Asia and Oceania.

The challenge of promoting Christianity in the field of social communications did not impede Cardinal Deskur from dedicating himself also to pastoral activity. During all his years in Rome he performed his priestly and episcopal ministry in numerous parishes. For many years he devoted himself to the office of spiritual director at the pre-seminary St. Pius V.

He was President of the Pontifical Academy of the Immaculate Conception.

Curial membership:

- Causes of Saints, Divine Worship and Sacraments (congregations)
- Health Care Workers (council)
- Vatican City State (commission)

Deskur died on 3 September 2011, aged 87. He was buried at the St. John Paul II Center, Krakow, Poland.

== Sources ==
- Official website of the Association of the Deskur Family "SRD"
