= Marianów, Pińczów County =

Marianów
- Village
- Location within Poland
- Coordinates: 50°24′32″N 20°22′43″E
- Country: Poland
- Voivodeship: Świętokrzyskie
- County: Pińczów
- Gmina: Działoszyce

Marianów [maˈrjanuf] is a village in the administrative district of Gmina Działoszyce, within Pińczów County, Świętokrzyskie Voivodeship, in south-central Poland. It lies approximately 6 km (4 mi) north-east of Działoszyce, 18 km (11 mi) south-west of Pińczów, and 56 km (35 mi) south of the regional capital Kielce.
