= Zagaje Dębiańskie =

- Village
- Location within Poland
- Coordinates: 50°24′N 20°28′E
- Country: Poland
- Voivodeship: Świętokrzyskie
- County: Pińczów
- Gmina: Działoszyce

Zagaje Dębiańskie [zaˈɡajɛ dɛmˈbjaɲskʲɛ] is a village in the administrative district of Gmina Działoszyce, within Pińczów County, Świętokrzyskie Voivodeship, in south-central Poland. It lies approximately 10 km (6 mi) north-east of Działoszyce, 16 km (10 mi) south of Pińczów, and 55 km (34 mi) south of the regional capital Kielce.
