= Dziekanowice, Świętokrzyskie Voivodeship =

Dziekanowice
- Village
- Location within Poland
- Coordinates: 50°21′20″N 20°21′11″E
- Country: Poland
- Voivodeship: Świętokrzyskie
- County: Pińczów
- Gmina: Działoszyce

Dziekanowice [d͡ʑɛkanɔˈvit͡sɛ] is a village in the administrative district of Gmina Działoszyce, within Pińczów County, Świętokrzyskie Voivodeship, in south-central Poland. It lies approximately 2 km (1 mi) south of Działoszyce, 24 km (15 mi) south-west of Pińczów, and 62 km (39 mi) south of the regional capital Kielce.
