= Dębiany, Pińczów County =

Dębiany
- Village
- Location within Poland
- Coordinates: 50°22′33″N 20°27′23″E
- Country: Poland
- Voivodeship: Świętokrzyskie
- County: Pińczów
- Gmina: Działoszyce

Dębiany [dɛmˈbjanɨ] is a village in the administrative district of Gmina Działoszyce, within Pińczów County, Świętokrzyskie Voivodeship, in south-central Poland. It lies approximately 8 km (5 mi) east of Działoszyce, 19 km (12 mi) south of Pińczów, and 58 km (36 mi) south of the regional capital Kielce.
