= Szczotkowice =

- Village
- Location within Poland
- Coordinates: 50°21′N 20°20′E
- Country: Poland
- Voivodeship: Świętokrzyskie
- County: Pińczów
- Gmina: Działoszyce

Szczotkowice [ʂt͡ʂɔtkɔˈvit͡sɛ] is a village in the administrative district of Gmina Działoszyce, within Pińczów County, Świętokrzyskie Voivodeship, in south-central Poland. It lies approximately 3 km (2 mi) south-west of Działoszyce, 25 km (16 mi) south-west of Pińczów, and 63 km (39 mi) south of the regional capital Kielce.
