= Stępocice =

- Village
- Location within Poland
- Coordinates: 50°26′N 20°20′E
- Country: Poland
- Voivodeship: Świętokrzyskie
- County: Pińczów
- Gmina: Działoszyce

Stępocice [stɛmpɔˈt͡ɕit͡sɛ] is a village in the administrative district of Gmina Działoszyce, within Pińczów County, Świętokrzyskie Voivodeship, in south-central Poland. It lies approximately 8 km (5 mi) north of Działoszyce, 18 km (11 mi) south-west of Pińczów, and 54 km (34 mi) south of the regional capital Kielce.
