= Ksawerów, Świętokrzyskie Voivodeship =

Ksawerów
- Village
- Location within Poland
- Coordinates: 50°23′21″N 20°21′6″E
- Country: Poland
- Voivodeship: Świętokrzyskie
- County: Pińczów
- Gmina: Działoszyce

Ksawerów [ksaˈvɛruf] is a village in the administrative district of Gmina Działoszyce, within Pińczów County, Świętokrzyskie Voivodeship, in south-central Poland. It lies approximately 3 km (2 mi) north of Działoszyce, 21 km (13 mi) south-west of Pińczów, and 58 km (36 mi) south of the regional capital Kielce.
