= Iżykowice =

- Village
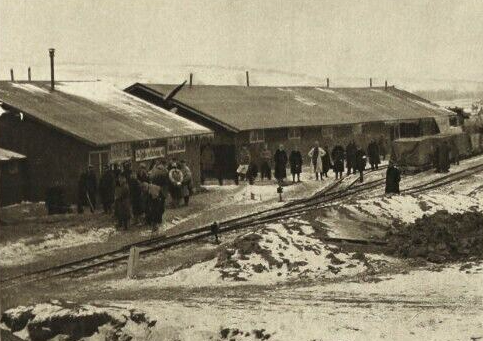
- Narrow gauge railway to Austro-Hungarian hospital in Iżykowice, 1914-1918

- Location within Poland
- Coordinates: 50°24′N 20°19′E
- Country: Poland
- Voivodeship: Świętokrzyskie
- County: Pińczów
- Gmina: Działoszyce

Iżykowice [iʐɨkɔˈvit͡sɛ] is a village in the administrative district of Gmina Działoszyce, within Pińczów County, Świętokrzyskie Voivodeship, in south-central Poland. It lies approximately 5 km (3 mi) north-west of Działoszyce, 22 km (14 mi) south-west of Pińczów, and 58 km (36 mi) south of the regional capital Kielce.
