= Gaik, Świętokrzyskie Voivodeship =

Gaik
- Village
- Location within Poland
- Coordinates: 50°23′28″N 20°26′49″E
- Country: Poland
- Voivodeship: Świętokrzyskie
- County: Pińczów
- Gmina: Działoszyce

Gaik [ˈɡaik] is a village in the administrative district of Gmina Działoszyce, within Pińczów County, Świętokrzyskie Voivodeship, in south-central Poland. It lies approximately 8 km (5 mi) east of Działoszyce, 17 km (11 mi) south of Pińczów, and 56 km (35 mi) south of the regional capital Kielce.
