= Teodorów, Świętokrzyskie Voivodeship =

Teodorów
- Village
- Location within Poland
- Coordinates: 50°27′7″N 20°17′58″E
- Country: Poland
- Voivodeship: Świętokrzyskie
- County: Pińczów
- Gmina: Działoszyce

Teodorów [tɛɔˈdɔruf] is a village in the administrative district of Gmina Działoszyce, within Pińczów County, Świętokrzyskie Voivodeship, in south-central Poland. It lies approximately 11 km (7 mi) north of Działoszyce, 19 km (12 mi) south-west of Pińczów, and 53 km (33 mi) south-west of the regional capital Kielce.
