= Niewiatrowice =

- Village
- Location within Poland
- Coordinates: 50°22′59″N 20°20′6″E
- Country: Poland
- Voivodeship: Świętokrzyskie
- County: Pińczów
- Gmina: Działoszyce

Niewiatrowice [ɲɛvjatrɔˈvit͡sɛ] is a village in the administrative district of Gmina Działoszyce, within Pińczów County, Świętokrzyskie Voivodeship, in south-central Poland. It lies approximately 3 km (2 mi) north-west of Działoszyce, 22 km (14 mi) south-west of Pińczów, and 59 km (37 mi) south of the regional capital Kielce.
