= Wymysłów, Gmina Działoszyce =

Wymysłów
- Village
- Location within Poland
- Coordinates: 50°23′34″N 20°22′57″E
- Country: Poland
- Voivodeship: Świętokrzyskie
- County: Pińczów
- Gmina: Działoszyce

Wymysłów [vɨˈmɨswuf] is a village in the administrative district of Gmina Działoszyce, within Pińczów County, Świętokrzyskie Voivodeship, in south-central Poland. It lies approximately 4 km (2 mi) north-east of Działoszyce, 19 km (12 mi) south-west of Pińczów, and 57 km (35 mi) south of the regional capital Kielce.
