= Lipówka, Świętokrzyskie Voivodeship =

Lipówka
- Village
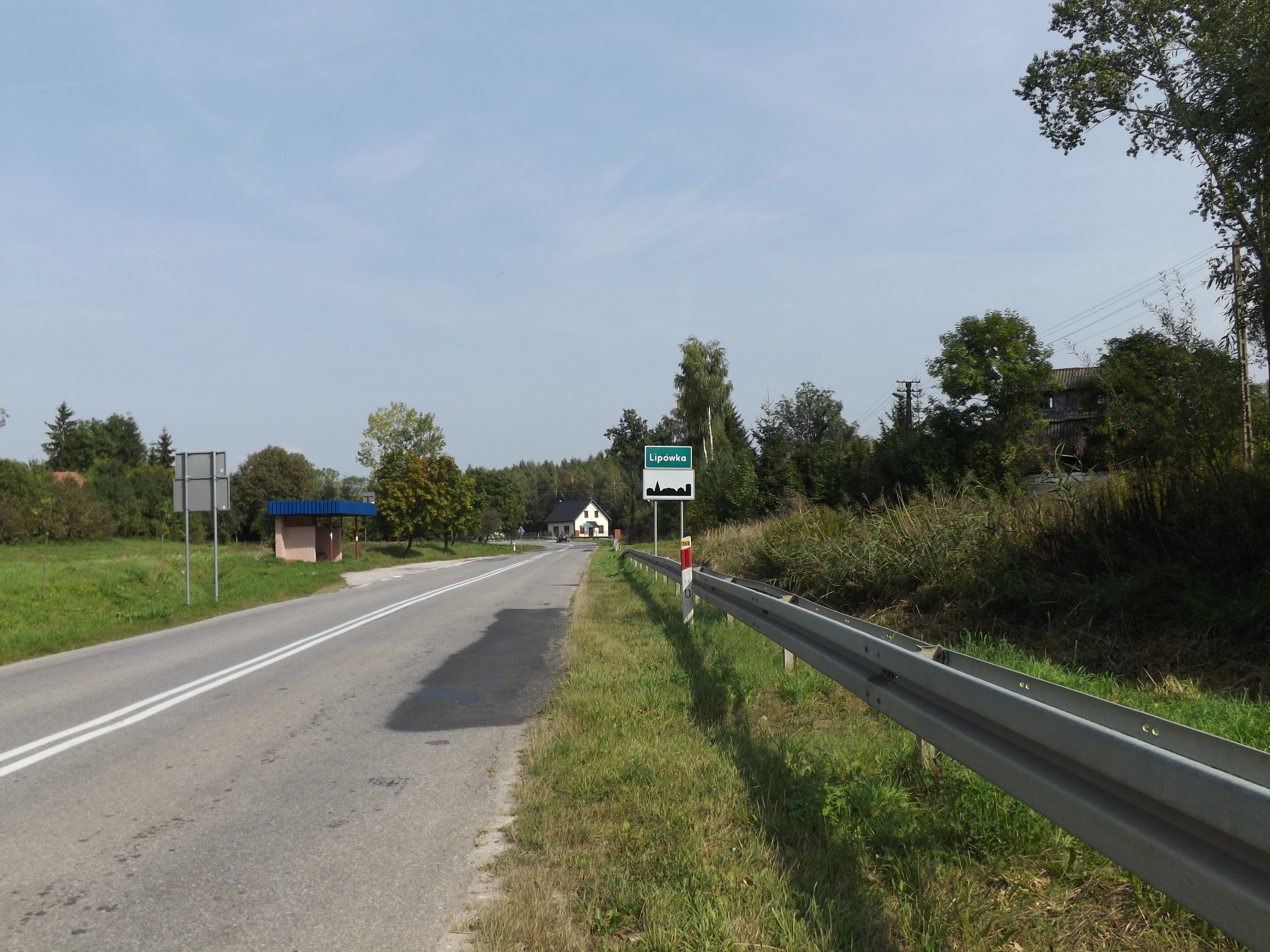

- Location within Poland
- Coordinates: 50°25′39″N 20°20′44″E
- Country: Poland
- Voivodeship: Świętokrzyskie
- County: Pińczów
- Gmina: Działoszyce

Lipówka [liˈpufka] is a village in the administrative district of Gmina Działoszyce, within Pińczów County, Świętokrzyskie Voivodeship, in south-central Poland. It lies approximately 7 km (4 mi) north of Działoszyce, 18 km (11 mi) south-west of Pińczów, and 55 km (34 mi) south of the regional capital Kielce.
