= Dzierążnia, Pińczów County =

Dzierążnia
- Village
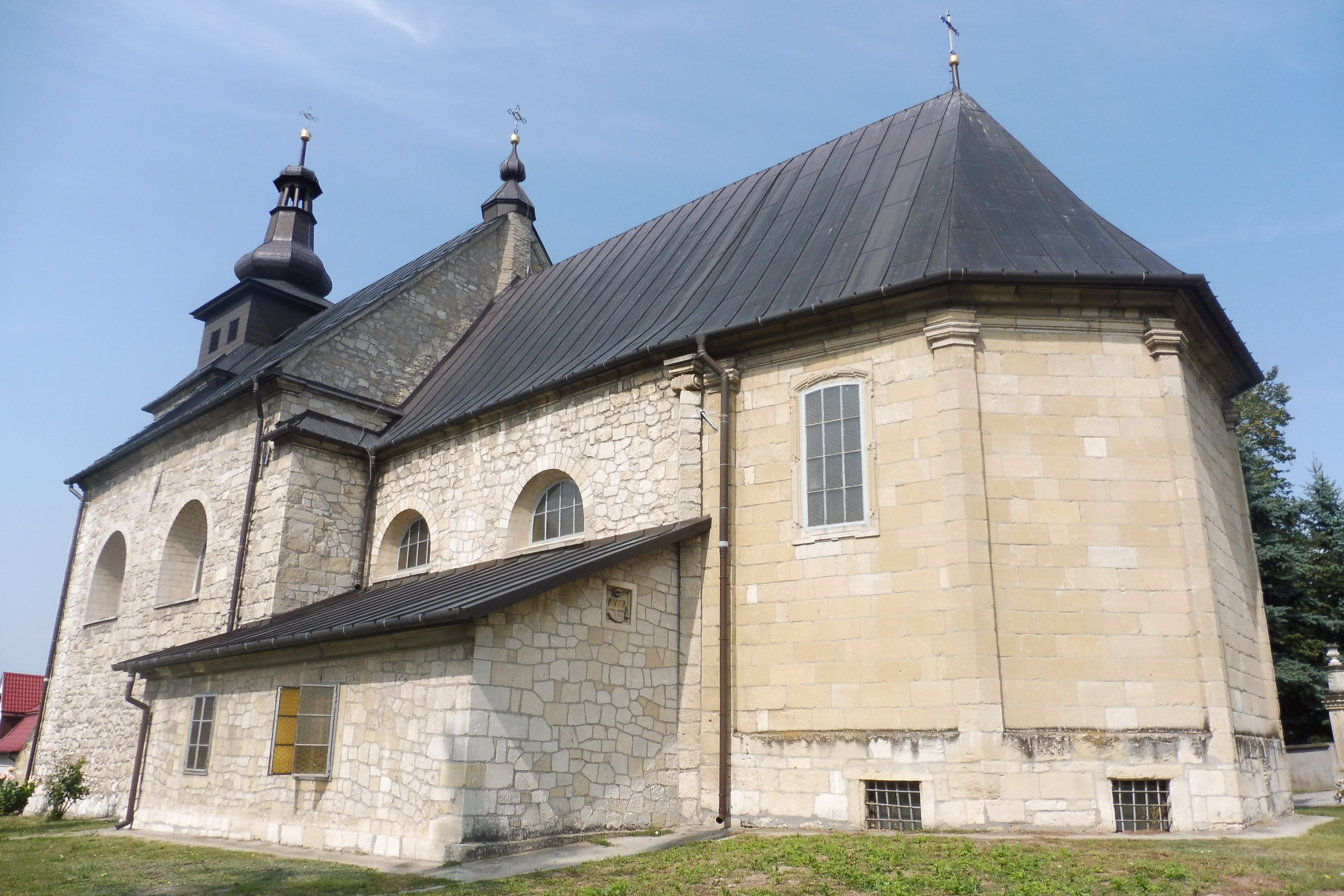
- Church

- Location within Poland
- Coordinates: 50°22′38″N 20°25′28″E
- Country: Poland
- Voivodeship: Świętokrzyskie
- County: Pińczów
- Gmina: Działoszyce

Dzierążnia [d͡ʑɛˈrɔ̃ʐɲa] is a village in the administrative district of Gmina Działoszyce, within Pińczów County, Świętokrzyskie Voivodeship, in south-central Poland. It lies approximately 6 km (4 mi) east of Działoszyce, 19 km (12 mi) south-west of Pińczów, and 58 km (36 mi) south of the regional capital Kielce.
