= Jakubowice, Pińczów County =

Village in Poland

Jakubowice
- Village
- Location within Poland
- Coordinates: 50°22′17″N 20°21′55″E
- Country: Poland
- Voivodeship: Świętokrzyskie
- County: Pińczów
- Gmina: Działoszyce

Jakubowice [jakubɔˈvit͡sɛ] is a village in the administrative district of Gmina Działoszyce, within Pińczów County, Świętokrzyskie Voivodeship, in south-central Poland. It lies approximately 2 km (1 mi) north-east of Działoszyce, 22 km (14 mi) south-west of Pińczów, and 60 km (37 mi) south of the regional capital Kielce.
