= Wola Knyszyńska =

- Village
- Location within Poland
- Coordinates: 50°27′N 20°17′E
- Country: Poland
- Voivodeship: Świętokrzyskie
- County: Pińczów
- Gmina: Działoszyce

Wola Knyszyńska [ˈvɔla knɨˈʂɨɲska] is a village located in the administrative district of Gmina Działoszyce, within Pińczów County, Świętokrzyskie Voivodeship, in south-central Poland. It lies approximately 11 km (7 mi) north-west of Działoszyce, 20 km (12 mi) south-west of Pińczów, and 54 km (34 mi) south-west of the regional capital Kielce.
