= Sudol =

Sudol may refer to:

== Places in Poland ==
- Sudoł, Lubusz Voivodeship
- Sudół, Jędrzejów County, Świętokrzyskie Voivodeship
- Sudół, Ostrowiec County, Świętokrzyskie Voivodeship
- Sudół, Pińczów County, Świętokrzyskie Voivodeship

== Other uses ==
- Sudol (surname), a surname
