= Januszowice, Pińczów County =

Januszowice
- Village
- Location within Poland
- Coordinates: 50°22′24″N 20°23′29″E
- Country: Poland
- Voivodeship: Świętokrzyskie
- County: Pińczów
- Gmina: Działoszyce

Januszowice [januʂɔˈvit͡sɛ] is a village in the administrative district of Gmina Działoszyce, within Pińczów County, Świętokrzyskie Voivodeship, in south-central Poland. It lies approximately 4 km (2 mi) east of Działoszyce, 21 km (13 mi) south-west of Pińczów, and 59 km (37 mi) south of the regional capital Kielce.
