= Kujawki, Świętokrzyskie Voivodeship =

Kujawki
- Village
- Location within Poland
- Coordinates: 50°21′41″N 20°24′54″E
- Country: Poland
- Voivodeship: Świętokrzyskie
- County: Pińczów
- Gmina: Działoszyce

Kujawki [kuˈjafki] is a village in the administrative district of Gmina Działoszyce, within Pińczów County, Świętokrzyskie Voivodeship, in south-central Poland. It lies approximately 5 km (3 mi) east of Działoszyce, 21 km (13 mi) south-west of Pińczów, and 60 km (37 mi) south of the regional capital Kielce.
