= Sypów =

- Village
- Location within Poland
- Coordinates: 50°24′0″N 20°26′0″E
- Country: Poland
- Voivodeship: Świętokrzyskie
- County: Pińczów
- Gmina: Działoszyce

Sypów [ˈsɨpuf] is a village in the administrative district of Gmina Działoszyce, within Pińczów County, Świętokrzyskie Voivodeship, in south-central Poland. It lies approximately 7 km (4 mi) north-east of Działoszyce, 17 km (11 mi) south-west of Pińczów, and 56 km (35 mi) south of the regional capital Kielce.
