= Chmielów, Pińczów County =

Chmielów
- Village
- Location within Poland
- Coordinates: 50°22′4″N 20°20′15″E
- Country: Poland
- Voivodeship: Świętokrzyskie
- County: Pińczów
- Gmina: Działoszyce

Chmielów [ˈxmjɛluf] is a village in the administrative district of Gmina Działoszyce, within Pińczów County, Świętokrzyskie Voivodeship, in south-central Poland. It lies approximately 1 km (1 mi) west of Działoszyce, 24 km (15 mi) south-west of Pińczów, and 61 km (38 mi) south of the regional capital Kielce.
