= Zofia Oleśnicka =

Polish Calvinist noblewoman and poet

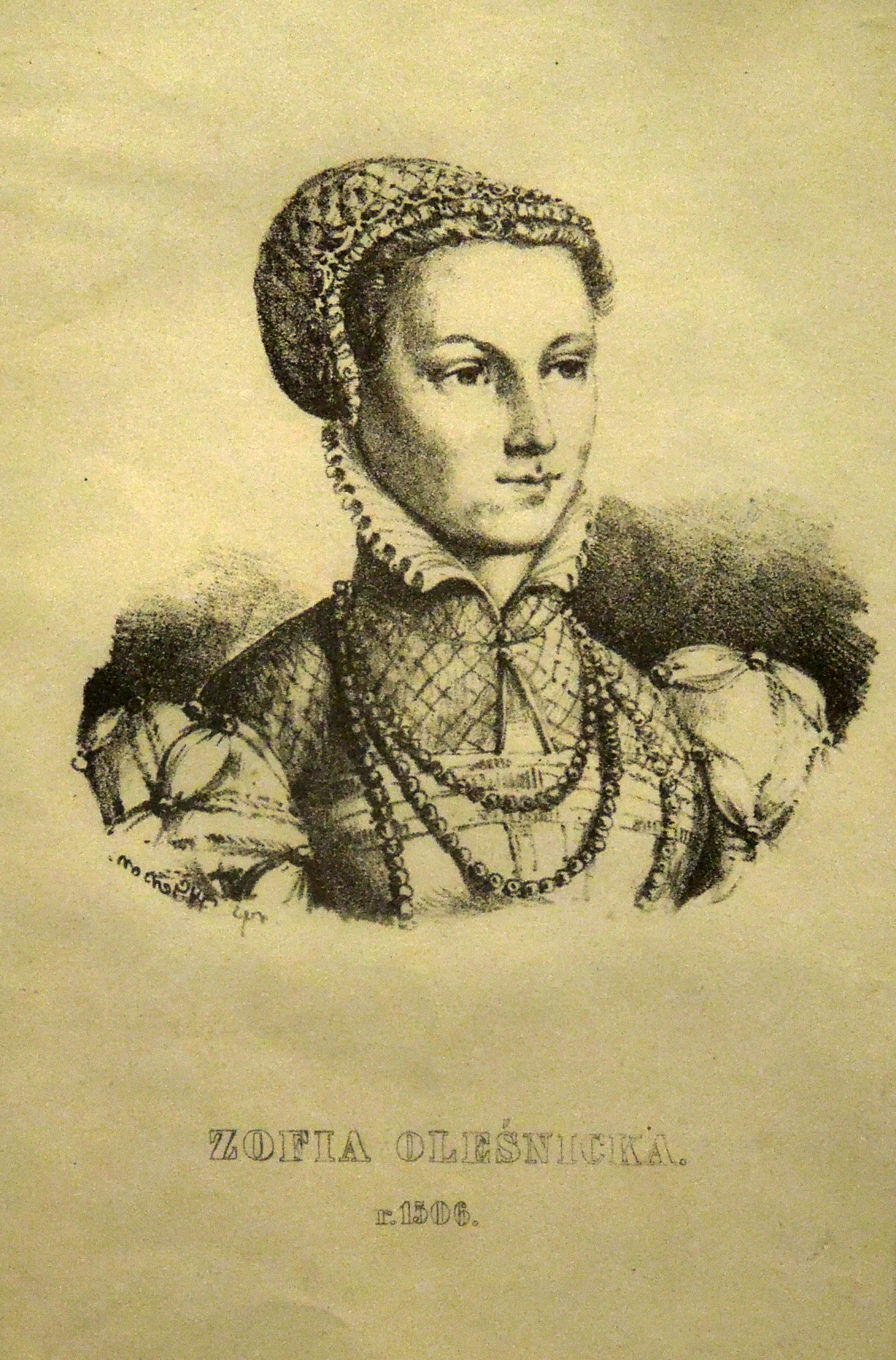
Zofia Oleśnicka

Zofia Oleśnicka (? in Pieskowa Skała – c.1567) was a Polish Calvinist noblewoman, for many years considered to be the first Polish woman poet for a collection of Protestant hymns published in Cracow in 1556. However more recent scholarship has questioned the attribution of this collection to Zofia, and has ascribed the poems to Cyprian Bazylik, a poet and composer among the Calvinist nobility.

== Life ==
She was daughter of the Calvinist starost (alderman) of Chęciny, Hieronim Szafraniec and his second wife, Zofia Zborowska. Her childhood and youth were spent at the Wawel, where her father held the office of secretary until Sigismund I the Old's death in 1548. She was married to Mikołaj Oleśnicki the elder lord of Pińczów, and later uncle of the diplomat Mikołaj Oleśnicki the younger. She had two sons, Andrzej and Jan Oleśnicki. She and her father persuaded her husband to Calvinism, and the family were then persuaded by the converted Italian priest Stancaro to make Pińczów a centre of Calvinism and establish a college the Pińczów Academy.

== The acrostic hymns ==
She was ascribed by Stanisław Lubieniecki in his History of the Polish Reformation (Historia Reformationis Polonicae 1685) as the author of 5 metric psalms in the 12 song collection of Cyprian Bazylik „Z ochotnem sercem, Ciebie wysławiam mój Panie” ("with a willing heart, I praise you my Lord.") 1556. This would make her the first woman poet in Poland along possibly with the Lutheran pastor's wife Regina Filipowska (died 1557). The reason for the attribution was the acrostic in the text „Zofia Olesnicka z Pyeskowey Skali” ("Zofia Oleśnicka from Pieskowa Skała"). However some recent scholarship has argued that this acrostic was not the hand of the author, but a dedication to the lady of the estate by Bazylik himself. The issue is still debated - no hard evidence exists confirming or denying Zofia's hand in the 5 poems.

Zofia and her husband died between June 1, 1566 and 15 March 1567. They were buried in the crypt of St. John's Evangelist Church (Pińczów).

The International Astronomical Union named one of the volcanic craters on Venus "Olesnicka" in her honour in 1994.
