= Mikołaj Oleśnicki the Younger =

Polish noble (1558–1629)

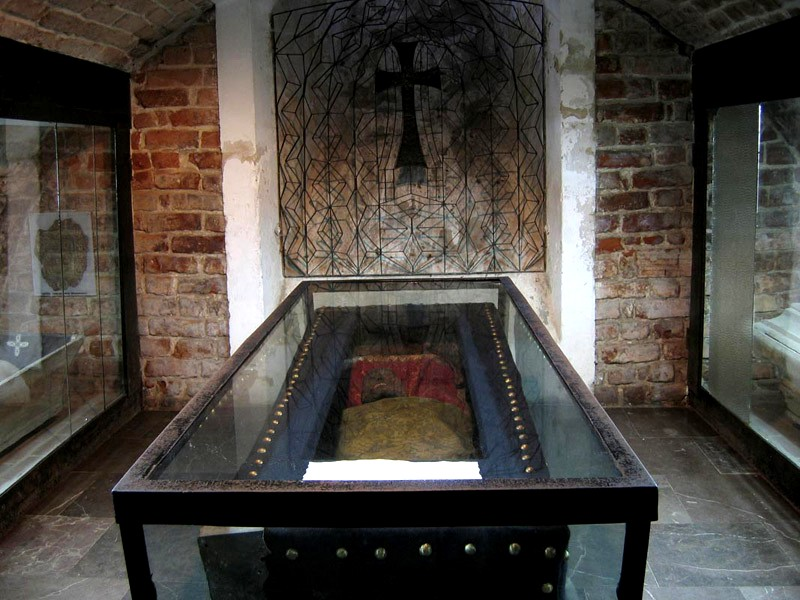
Crypt in the Oleśnicki chapel

Mikołaj Oleśnicki the younger (30 April 1558 - 13 December 1629) was a Polish nobleman and latterly voivode of Lublin. He was son of Jan Oleśnicki, lord of Chmielnik in the voivodie of Sandomir His uncle was Lord Mikołaj Oleśnicki the elder (d. 1556) a Polish Calvinist nobleman who established the first Protestant academy in Poland at Pińczów in 1550, and his aunt Zofia Oleśnicka (d. c.1567) was the first notable Polish woman poet.

Raised a Calvinist, he converted in 1598 to Roman Catholicism, and became an important figure at court.
