= Matthias Albinus =

Polish minister

Maciej Albin or Latin Matthias Albinus (fl. 1570s) was a Polish Calvinist minister at Iwanowice Dworskie who became the first to administer Believer's baptism in Poland, and then became openly Unitarian.

== Overview ==
He differed from the Calvinists and many of the Arians at Pińczów in denying the pre-existence of Christ. And at the Synod of Skrzynno in 1567 stood with Georg Schomann, Gregory Pauli and Marcin Czechowic among the Polish Brethren. Although the term Socinian is anachronistic, he was counted among Socinian authors by Christopher Sandius.

Robert Robinson's Ecclesiastical Researches (1792) incorrectly states that Albinus was a Trinitarian till the end of his life but this is contradicted by Bock, Historia Antitrinitarianorum.
