= Pińczów Academy =

16th-century Calvinist college in Pińczów, Poland

The Pińczów Academy or Gymnasium was a Calvinist college in Pińczów, Poland from 1550–1565. This coincides with the Calvinist synods of Pińczów 1550–1564.

Lord Nicholas Oleśnicki inherited the Pińczów estate in 1546. He was influenced by his wife Zofia Oleśnicka, and his father in law, to Calvinism. First Andreas Osiander and then the Italian ex-priest Francesco Stancaro, two Calvinist professors at the University of Königsberg, preached in Pińczów.

Stancaro moved Olesnicki to drive out the monks and convert the monastic church at Pinczow to Calvinist rite November 25, 1550. Then from 1551 founded the Academy.

== Teaching staff ==
The first rector was Grzegorz Orszak of the University of Kraków. In 1556 Calvin sent Pierre Statorius to be the new rector, in addition to teaching Latin and Greek. Other teachers included Francesco Lismanino, Georg Schomann and Jean Thenaud.

== Alumni ==
Students included

- Justus Rabb (d. 1612) - Jesuit theologian
- Aleksy Rodecki (d.1606) - printer in Rakow
- Krzysztof Przechadzka - later a teacher at the academy.
- Stanisław Cikowski (d.1617) - chamberlain of Kraków
- Remigiusz Chełmski - antitrinitarian

The school was forced to close temporarily 1565. A plan was started in 1578 to reopen as a university, but the acquisition of the town by the Bishop of Kraków led to the end of Calvinist activity.

== Printery ==
From 1558-1562 Daniel z Łęczycy operated a printing press at Pińczów publishing Andrzej Frycz Modrzewski and others. After printing an antitrinitarian work by Stancaro it was burned on 1 September 1559 but restarted and ran for another 3 years.
