= Świerczyna =

Świerczyna may refer to the following places:

- Świerczyna, Opoczno County in Łódź Voivodeship (central Poland)
- Świerczyna, Pabianice County in Łódź Voivodeship (central Poland)
- Świerczyna, Lublin Voivodeship (east Poland)
- Świerczyna, Świętokrzyskie Voivodeship (south-central Poland)
- Świerczyna, Leszno County in Greater Poland Voivodeship (west-central Poland)
- Świerczyna, Pleszew County in Greater Poland Voivodeship (west-central Poland)
- Świerczyna, Drawsko County in West Pomeranian Voivodeship (north-west Poland)
- Świerczyna, Koszalin County in West Pomeranian Voivodeship (north-west Poland)
