= Johannes Wolf =

Johannes or Johann Wolf may refer to:

- Johannes Wolf (theologian) (1521–1572), Swiss Reformed theologian
- Johannes Wolf (musicologist) (1869–1947), German musicologist
- Johann Wolf (naturalist) (1765–1824), German naturalist
- Johann Christoph Wolf (1683–1739), German Christian Hebraist and polyhistor
- Johannes Wolf (kickboxer), German kickboxer

== See also ==
- Johann Wolff (1537–1600), German jurist
- Rudolf Wolf (born Johann Rudolf Wolf, 1816–1893), Swiss astronomer and mathematician
- John de Wolf (born Johannes Hildebrand de Wolf, born 1962), Dutch former professional footballer
- Markus Wolf (born Markus Johannes Wolf, 1923–2006), East German intelligence officer
