= Sancygniów =

- Village
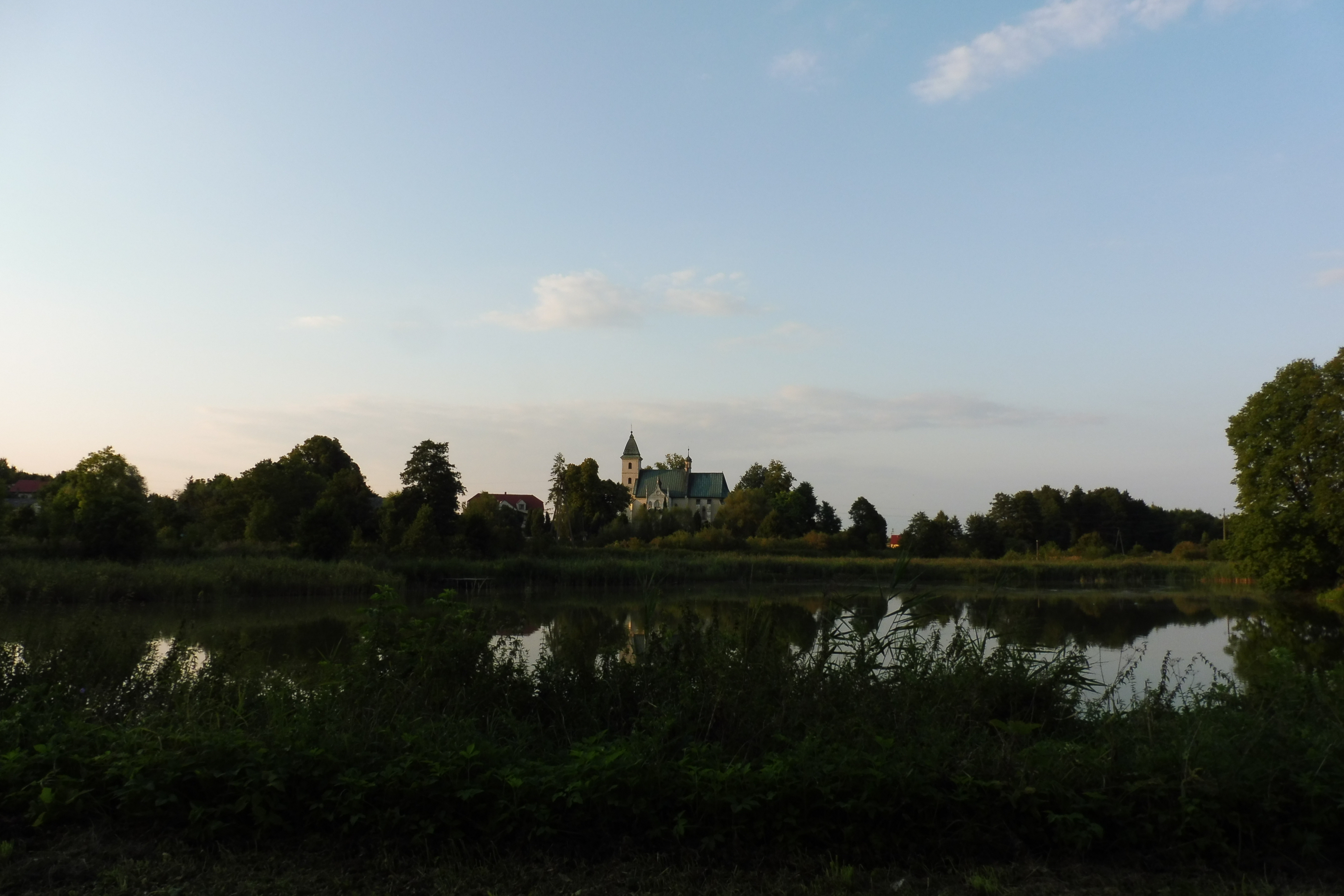

- Location within Poland
- Coordinates: 50°25′N 20°19′E
- Country: Poland
- Voivodeship: Świętokrzyskie
- County: Pińczów
- Gmina: Działoszyce

Population
  - Total: 260

Sancygniów [sanˈt͡sɨɡɲuf] is a village in the administrative district of Gmina Działoszyce, within Pińczów County, Świętokrzyskie Voivodeship, in south-central Poland. It lies approximately 7 km (4 mi) north-west of Działoszyce, 21 km (13 mi) south-west of Pińczów, and 56 km (35 mi) south of the regional capital Kielce.

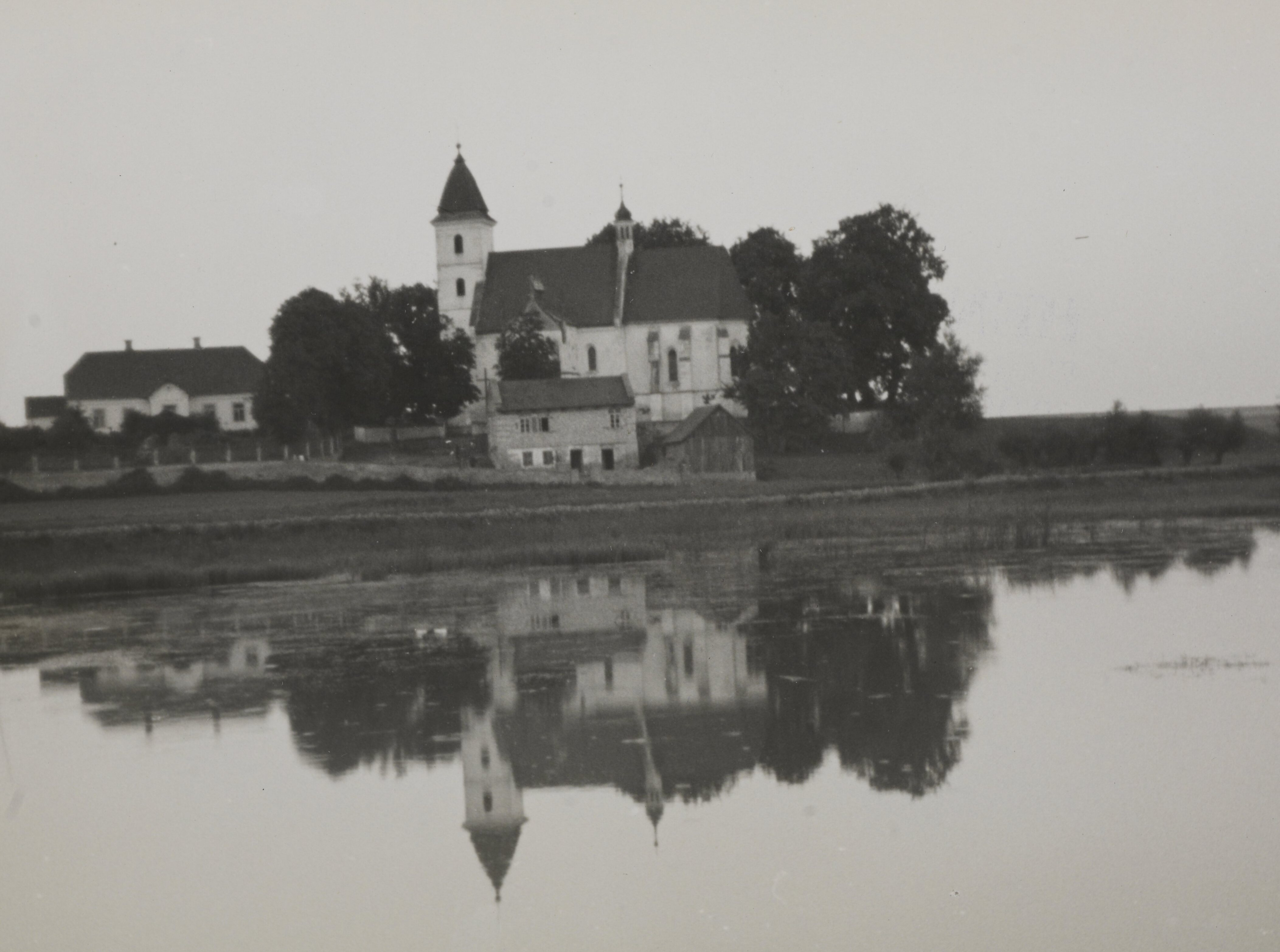
Church of St. Peter and Paul, ca 1936

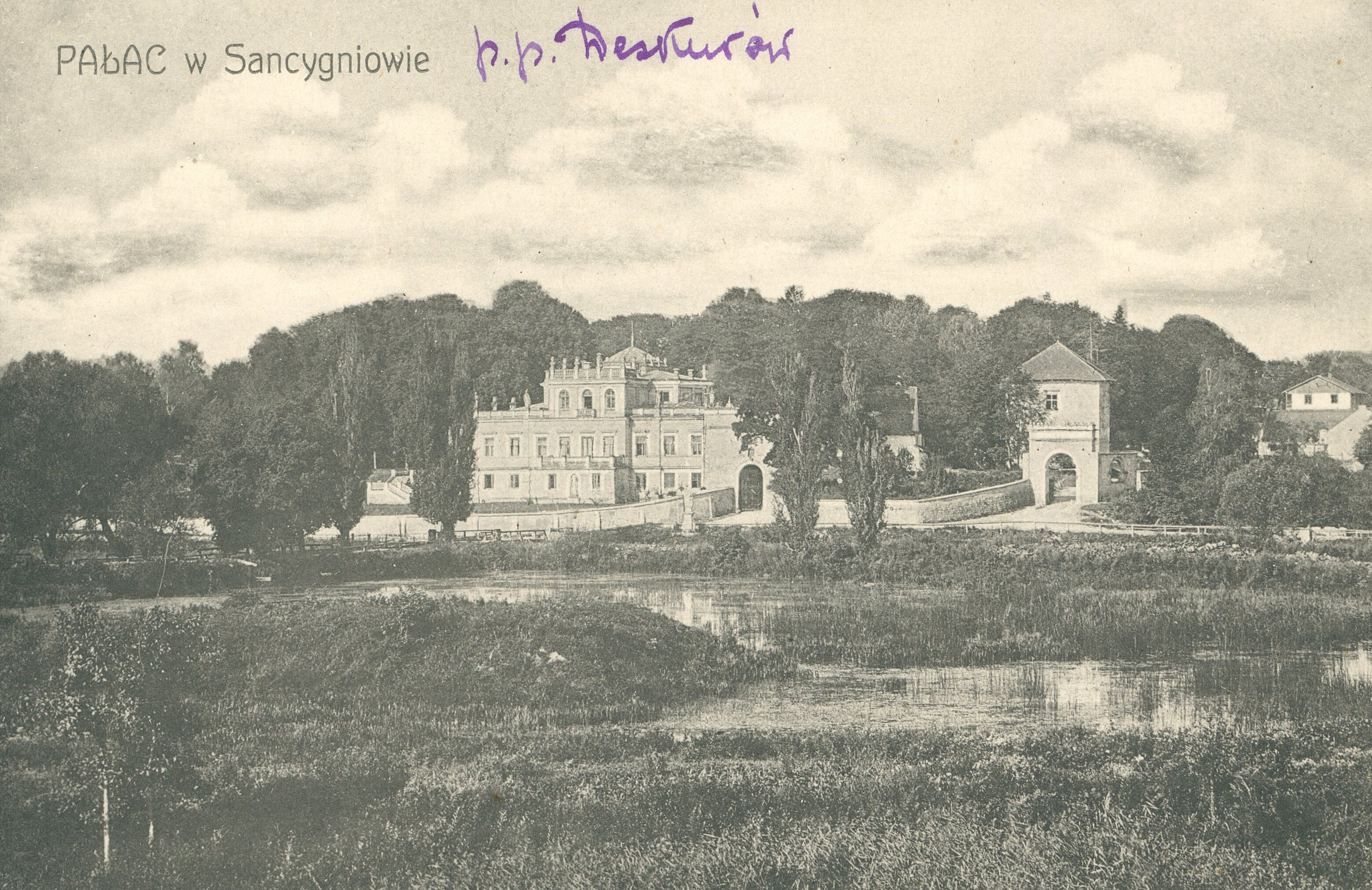
View of the palace before 1920

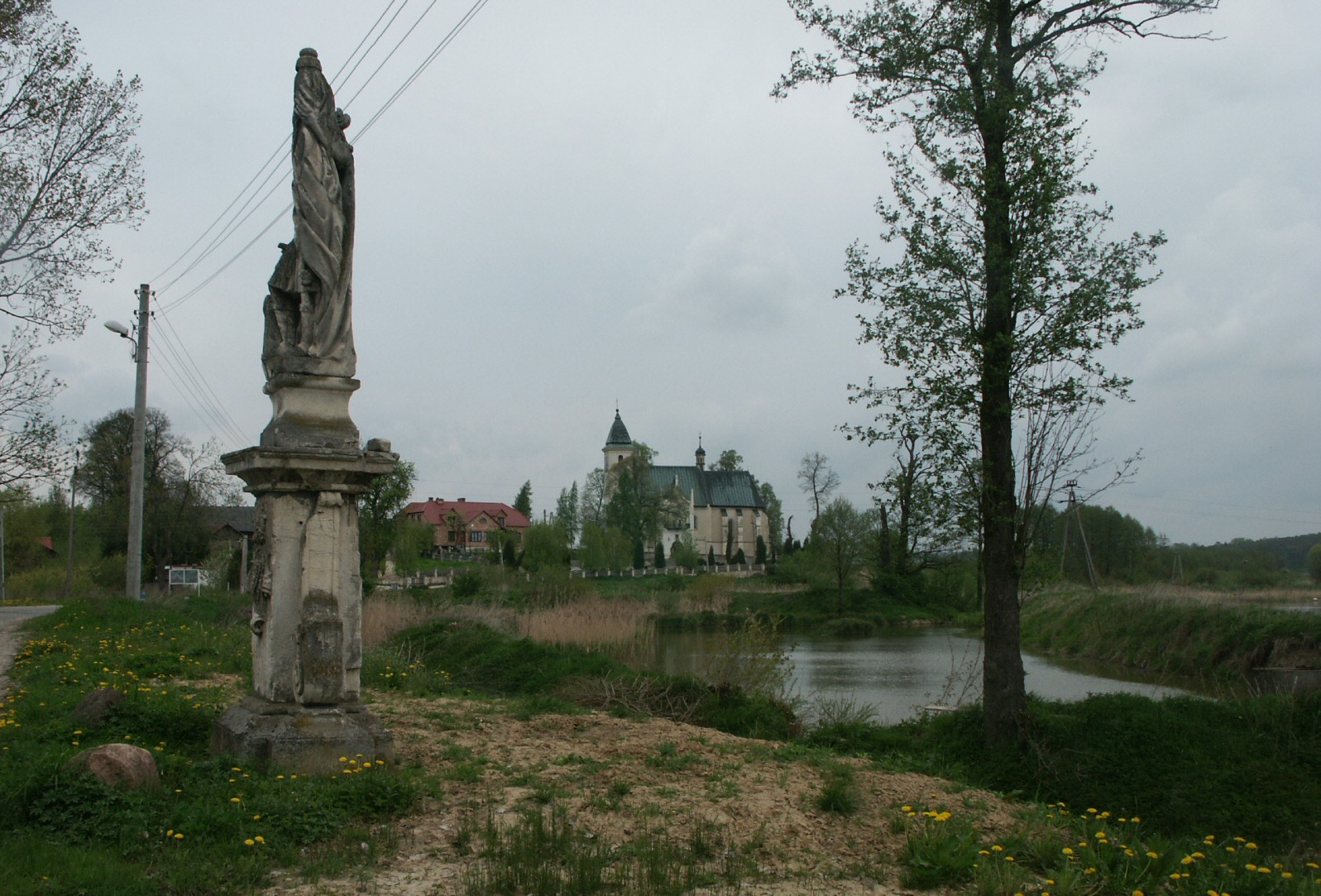
A view of Saints Peter and Paul's church in Sancygniów
