= Opatkowice =

Opatkowice may refer to the following places:

- Opatkowice, part of the Swoszowice district of Kraków
- Opatkowice, Proszowice County in Lesser Poland Voivodeship (south Poland)
- Opatkowice, Lublin Voivodeship (east Poland)
- Opatkowice, Masovian Voivodeship (east-central Poland)
- Opatkowice, Świętokrzyskie Voivodeship (south-central Poland)
