= Opatkowice, Świętokrzyskie Voivodeship =

Opatkowice
- Village
- Location within Poland
- Coordinates: 50°23′40″N 20°19′40″E
- Country: Poland
- Voivodeship: Świętokrzyskie
- County: Pińczów
- Gmina: Działoszyce

Opatkowice [ɔpatkɔˈvit͡sɛ] is a village in the administrative district of Gmina Działoszyce, within Pińczów County, Świętokrzyskie Voivodeship, in south-central Poland. It lies approximately 4 km (2 mi) north-west of Działoszyce, 22 km (14 mi) south-west of Pińczów, and 58 km (36 mi) south of the regional capital Kielce.
