= Sudół, Pińczów County =

Sudół
- Village
- Location within Poland
- Coordinates: 50°22′17″N 20°26′33″E
- Country: Poland
- Voivodeship: Świętokrzyskie
- County: Pińczów
- Gmina: Działoszyce

Sudół [ˈsuduu̯] is a village in the administrative district of Gmina Działoszyce, within Pińczów County, Świętokrzyskie Voivodeship, in south-central Poland. It lies approximately 7 km (4 mi) east of Działoszyce, 20 km (12 mi) south of Pińczów, and 59 km (37 mi) south of the regional capital Kielce.

== Population ==
The population of was 132 in 2021.
