= Synods of Pińczów =

The Synods of Pińczów were a series of 22 Calvinist synods held in the town of Pińczów from 1550-1563.

At the time of the Reformation, Pińczów belonged to a Calvinist nobleman, Nicholas Oleśnicki, and was one of the centers of Calvinism and Arianism in Poland. Synods were held in the former Pauline monastery church. Associated with these synods were the Pińczów Academy and the Brest Bible translation project, together with the emergence of the Polish Brethren who were later known as Socinians.

== Major Protestant synods in Pińczów ==
- Autumn 1550 - the first congress of Protestant gentry and clergy.
- April 1556 - Piotr of Goniądz is the first Antitrinitarian to be excommunicated.
- 1559 - Jan Laski convenes a synod against Francesco Stancaro
- 1559 - Remigiusz Chełmski and the French grammarian Pierre Statorius deny the validity of prayer to the Holy Spirit, calling it "blasphemy." The Synod approves a draft translation of the Bible of Brest and appoints translators to work on the project.
- 1562 - Stanisław Paklepka and Gregory Paul of Brzeziny reject the doctrine of the Trinity as a "papal" concept, without Biblical support. On 2 April, a majority approve of a synodal creed rejecting the Trinity.
- October 1563 - in October the last General Synod in Pińczów sees the formation of a "Polish Minor Reformed Church" (Ecclesia minor), comprising antitrinitarians, called "Arians" or "Polish Brethren", who separate from the Greater Calvinist Reformed Church (Ecclesia maior).

== Other Protestant synods ==
Pińczów was not the only location of Protestant synods. In 1556, at the Synod of Secemin,(January 22, 1556), Piotr of Goniądz denied the Trinity, leading to his excommunication mentioned above, and gave a more complete development of his doctrine at the synod of Brest, in Lithuania, in 1558, when he rejected the baptism of infants.

=== Calvinist synods ===
After 1563 Calvinist synods continued to be held, but separately.

=== Polish Brethren synods ===
- 1564 Synod of Piotrków Trybunalski, where a final separation of Calvinists and Polish Brethren took place.
- December 25, 1565 anti-Trinitarian synod at Węgrów
- 24 June 1567 Synod of Skrzynno a synod between the Arians and Socinians among the Antitrinitarian Polish Brethren
