= Jastrzębniki =

Jastrzębniki may refer to the following places:

- Jastrzębniki, Kalisz County in Greater Poland Voivodeship (west-central Poland)
- Jastrzębniki, Nowy Tomyśl County in Greater Poland Voivodeship (west-central Poland)
- Jastrzębniki, Świętokrzyskie Voivodeship (south-central Poland)
- Jastrzębniki, West Pomeranian Voivodeship (north-west Poland)
