= Pińczów Synagogue =

Former synagogue in Pińczów, Poland

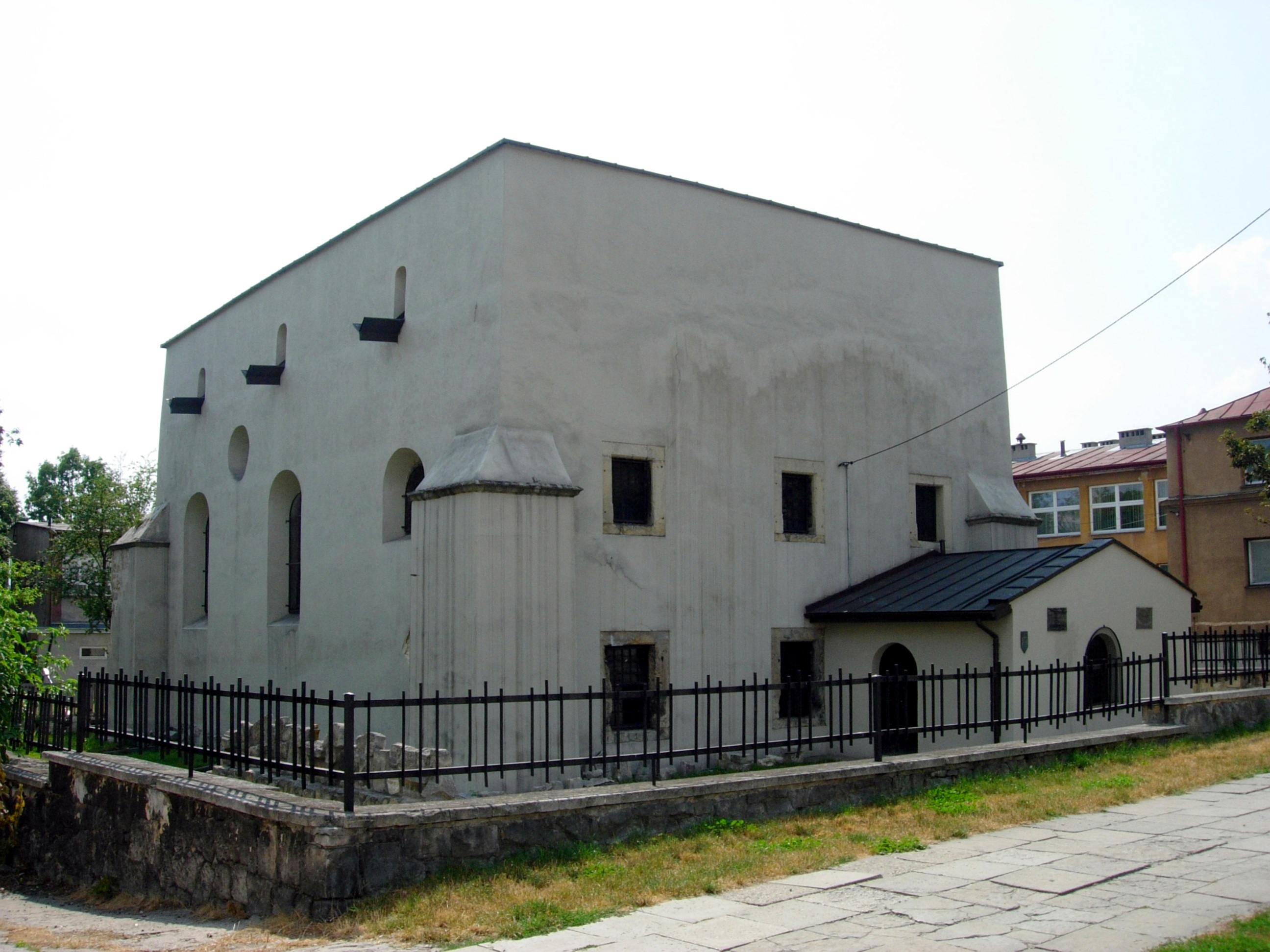
- The former synagogue in 2006

- Location of the former synagogue in Świętokrzyskie Voivodeship

Religion
- Affiliation: Judaism (former)
- Rite: Nusach Ashkenaz
- Ecclesiastical or organizational status: Synagogue (1609–1939); Profane use (1939–1970s)
- Status: Abandoned (as a synagogue)

Location
- Location: Klasztorna Street, Pińczów, Świętokrzyskie Voivodeship
- Country: Poland
- Interactive map of Pińczów Synagogue
- Coordinates: 50°31′05″N 20°31′44″E

Architecture
- Type: Synagogue architecture
- Style: Renaissance
- Groundbreaking: 1594
- Completed: 1609
- Materials: Stone

The Pińczów Synagogue, also known as the Old Synagogue in Pińczów, is an historic former Jewish synagogue building, located in Pińczów, Świętokrzyskie Voivodeship, Poland. The synagogue was completed in 1609 in the Renaissance style.

== History ==
It is one of the oldest synagogues in Poland, built between 1594 and 1609. It was damaged during the Holocaust, which led to its disuse. Restoration on the building began in the 1970s, led by the Pińczów Regional Museum, with most of the repairs completed by 1998.

== See also ==
- History of the Jews in Poland
- List of active synagogues in Poland
