= Dębowiec, Świętokrzyskie Voivodeship =

Dębowiec
- Village
- Location within Poland
- Coordinates: 50°23′50″N 20°21′49″E
- Country: Poland
- Voivodeship: Świętokrzyskie
- County: Pińczów
- Gmina: Działoszyce

Dębowiec [dɛmˈbɔvjɛt͡s] is a village in the administrative district of Gmina Działoszyce, within Pińczów County, Świętokrzyskie Voivodeship, in south-central Poland.
