= Gmina Działoszyce =

Gmina Działoszyce Działoszyce Commune
- Gmina
- Coat of arms
- Interactive map of Gmina Działoszyce
- Coordinates (Działoszyce): 50°22′N 20°21′E
- Country: Poland
- Voivodeship: Świętokrzyskie
- County: Pińczów
- Seat: Działoszyce

Area
  - Total: 105.48 km^{2} (40.73 sq mi)

Population (2006)
  - Total: 5,640
  - Density: 53.5/km^{2} (138/sq mi)
  - Urban: 1,068
  - Rural: 4,572
- Website: http://www.dzialoszyce.pl

Gmina Działoszyce is an urban-rural gmina (administrative district) in Pińczów County, Świętokrzyskie Voivodeship, in south-central Poland. Its seat is the town of Działoszyce, which lies approximately 23 kilometres (14 mi) south-west of Pińczów and 61 km (38 mi) south of the regional capital Kielce.

The gmina covers an area of 105.48 square kilometres (40.7 sq mi), and as of 2006 its total population is 5,640 (out of which the population of Działoszyce amounts to 1,068, and the population of the rural part of the gmina is 4,572).

The gmina contains part of the protected area called Kozubów Landscape Park.

== Villages ==
Apart from the town of Działoszyce, Gmina Działoszyce contains the villages and settlements of Biedrzykowice, Bronocice, Bronów, Chmielów, Dębiany, Dębowiec, Dziekanowice, Dzierążnia, Dziewięczyce, Gaik, Iżykowice, Jakubowice, Januszowice, Jastrzębniki, Ksawerów, Kujawki, Kwaszyn, Lipówka, Marianów, Niewiatrowice, Opatkowice, Pierocice, Podrózie, Sancygniów, Stępocice, Sudół, Świerczyna, Sypów, Szczotkowice, Szyszczyce, Teodorów, Wola Knyszyńska, Wolica, Wymysłów, Zagaje Dębiańskie and Zagórze.

== Neighbouring gminas ==
Gmina Działoszyce is bordered by the gminas of Czarnocin, Książ Wielki, Michałów, Pińczów, Racławice, Skalbmierz, Słaboszów and Wodzisław.
