= Sudol (surname) =

Sudol or Sudoł is a surname. Notable people with the surname include:

- Alison Sudol (born 1984), American singer-songwriter, actress and music video director
- Ed Sudol (1920–2004), American baseball player
- Grzegorz Sudoł (born 1978), Polish race walker
- Marius Sudol (born 1954), American biologist
- Sara Sudoł, (born 1998), birth name of Young Leosia, Polish singer, rapper, songwriter, sound engineer and DJ
