= Stanisław Paklepka =

Polish religious leader (died 1565)

Stanisław Paklepka, Latin Paclesius (d. Lublin 1565) was one of the first generation of Polish Calvinists, then later an Arian. At the Synods of Pińczów in 1562 Stanisław Paklepka and Gregory Paul of Brzeziny rejected the doctrine of the Trinity as a "papal" concept, without Biblical support, as also infant baptism.
