= Piotr of Goniądz =

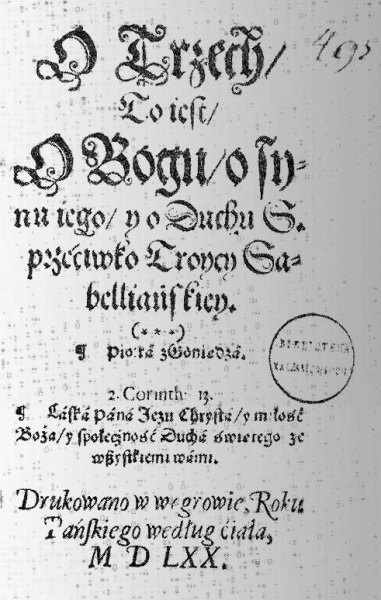
Cover of Piotr's antitrinitatrian work "On the subject of the Three"

Piotr of Goniądz (Polish: Piotr z Goniądza, pronounced [ˈpʲɔtr zɡɔˈɲɔndza]; Latin: Gonesius; c. 1525–1573) was a Polish political and religious writer, thinker and one of the spiritual leaders of the Polish Brethren.

== Life ==
Little is known of his early life. He was born to a peasant family some time between 1525 and 1530 in the town of Goniądz. According to Symon Budny his true name was Giezek, though throughout his life he used a variety of names and pseudonyms, including Gonesius, Gonedzius, Conyza and Koniński. He was sent by his parents to a monastery and became a Catholic priest. Supported by the bishop of Wilno Paweł Holszański, Piotr was sent to Italy, where he graduated from the University of Padua. There he received a doctorate in philosophy and became one of the professors. However, following his lecture of the anonymous work by Miguel Serveto and similar works by an Italian professor Matteo Gribaldi, Piotr of Goniądz converted to Protestantism and returned to Poland.

One of the pioneers of anabaptism in Poland, he was active as one of the notable members of the Protestant community formed around Mikołaj Radziwiłł. It was he who contacted the anabaptists exiled from the German states who settled in large numbers in Moravia and convinced many of them to settle in Poland. He was also heavily influenced by the views of Bohemian Hussites, who supported modesty, life in poverty and disregard for mundane life. For his support of unitarianism and anti-trinitarianism at the Protestant council of Secemin (22 January 1556), he was officially excommunicated by the Calvinists at the Synod of Pińczów in April of that year. He was also banished from Lesser Poland. However, he found several supporters of his ideas, mostly from among the lesser szlachta of Podlaskie and the lands of Grand Duchy of Lithuania. Probably in 1558 he found a benefactor and patron in person of Jan Kiszka, one of the most powerful magnates of his time. Invited to Węgrów, Piotr became the head of the local Protestant commune and one of the most notable leaders of the Calvinist community in Poland.

The radical political, ethical and religious beliefs of Piotr of Goniądz gained him much popularity among the Protestant clergy and lesser gentry, though also created many conflicts, especially with the magnates. Piotr supported egalitarianism, pacifism and disregard for mundane life. The members of his community, often regarded as a sect within the Calvinist church, were forbidden to hold any public office, serve in the army or even carry arms. Piotr also strongly opposed serfdom, which led to constant conflicts even with his patron.

=== Schism between Ecclesia Major and Ecclesia Minor ===
In 1565 the schism within the Polish Calvinist church became a fact and Gonesius became a leader along with Marcin Czechowic and others of the so-called Ecclesia Minor, while the majority of Polish Protestants, the Ecclesia Major, remained faithful to the much less radical beliefs of John Calvin.

He died in Węgrów on 15 October 1573, during an outbreak of plague.

== Works ==
The most notable of his works, the De filio Dei homine Christo Iesu (translated as On the Son of God, though literal translation would be On the Son of God, a Human Jesus Christ), did not survive to our times.

Other of his notable works were published in 1570 in Kiszka's printing house in Węgrów. Among them was Doktrina pura et clara de praecepuis Christianae religionis articulus, which survived in a single copy currently held in Bibliothèque Nationale in Paris.

O ponurzaniu chrystiańskim (On Christian Baptism).

O trzech (On Trinity).

== See also ==
- List of Poles
