= Pierocice =

- Village
- Location within Poland
- Coordinates: 50°21′N 20°20′E
- Country: Poland
- Voivodeship: Świętokrzyskie
- County: Pińczów
- Gmina: Działoszyce

Pierocice [pjɛrɔˈt͡ɕit͡sɛ] is a village in the administrative district of Gmina Działoszyce, within Pińczów County, Świętokrzyskie Voivodeship, in south-central Poland.
