= Synod of Skrzynno =

Important event among Polish Unitarians

The Synod of Skrzynno 24 June 1567 was a synod between the Arians and Socinians among the Antitrinitarian Polish Brethren.

From 1550-1563 Calvinists and Arians had met together at the Synods of Pińczów, the final synod in 1563 marking the break between the Calvinist ecclesia maior and the ecclesia minor of the Polish Brethren. A synod the following year at Piotrków Trybunalski in 1564, cemented the separation of Calvinists and Anti-Trinitarians.

At the anti-Trinitarian synod at Węgrów on December 25, 1565 Georg Schomann, Matthias Albinus and Gregory Pauli took positions against Arianism, the belief in the pre-existence of Christ, marking the beginnings of characteristic Socinian belief (although) Fausto Sozzini did not arrive in Poland till 14 years later in 1579.

The synod of Skrzynno was held at Skrzynno, Masovian Voivodeship, not Skrzynno, Łódź Voivodeship. Several divisions among the Polish Brethren were visible but the parties adopted a resolution maintaining an external union based on a unitarian doctrine.
