= Francesco Lismanini =

Italian Protestant (c. 1504 – 1566)

Francesco Lismanini (c. 1504 – April 1566) was an Italian Franciscan friar of Greek origin, who converted to Calvinism and also a Protestant reformer.

== Biography ==
Lismanini was born in c. 1504 on Corfu. His Greek parents soon moved to Italy and in 1515 the family arrived in Kraków, Poland, where in 1525, Francis became a Franciscan friar. A fine preacher, he was chosen by Queen Bona Sforza, compatriot and wife of King Sigismund I the Old, as a preacher and confessor.

In 1540, he was elected as a Franciscan Father, but as a humanist of the Erasmian circle and proponent of reformed doctrines, in 1550 he was suspected of heresy during a trip to Italy. In 1553, arrived in Moravia, then returning again to Italy and then Switzerland, where he openly proclaimed Calvinism and became a friend of John Calvin, Heinrich Bullinger and Johannes Wolf.

He returned to Poland to be part of the Protestant Church of Poland. He tried to reach an agreement with the anti-Trinitarian church of the Polish Brethren to strengthen the Reform movement, but due to the opposition of Calvin and Bullinger, the attempt failed. Thus in the late 1550s he was involved with numerous Calvinist and Lutheran disputes with people such as Francesco Stancaro. In 1563, he entered the service of Duke Albrecht of Prussia in Königsberg, where he died in April 1566.
