= Church of St. John the Evangelist, Pińczów =

Church in Pińczów, Poland

Coordinates: 50°31′14″N 20°31′38″E

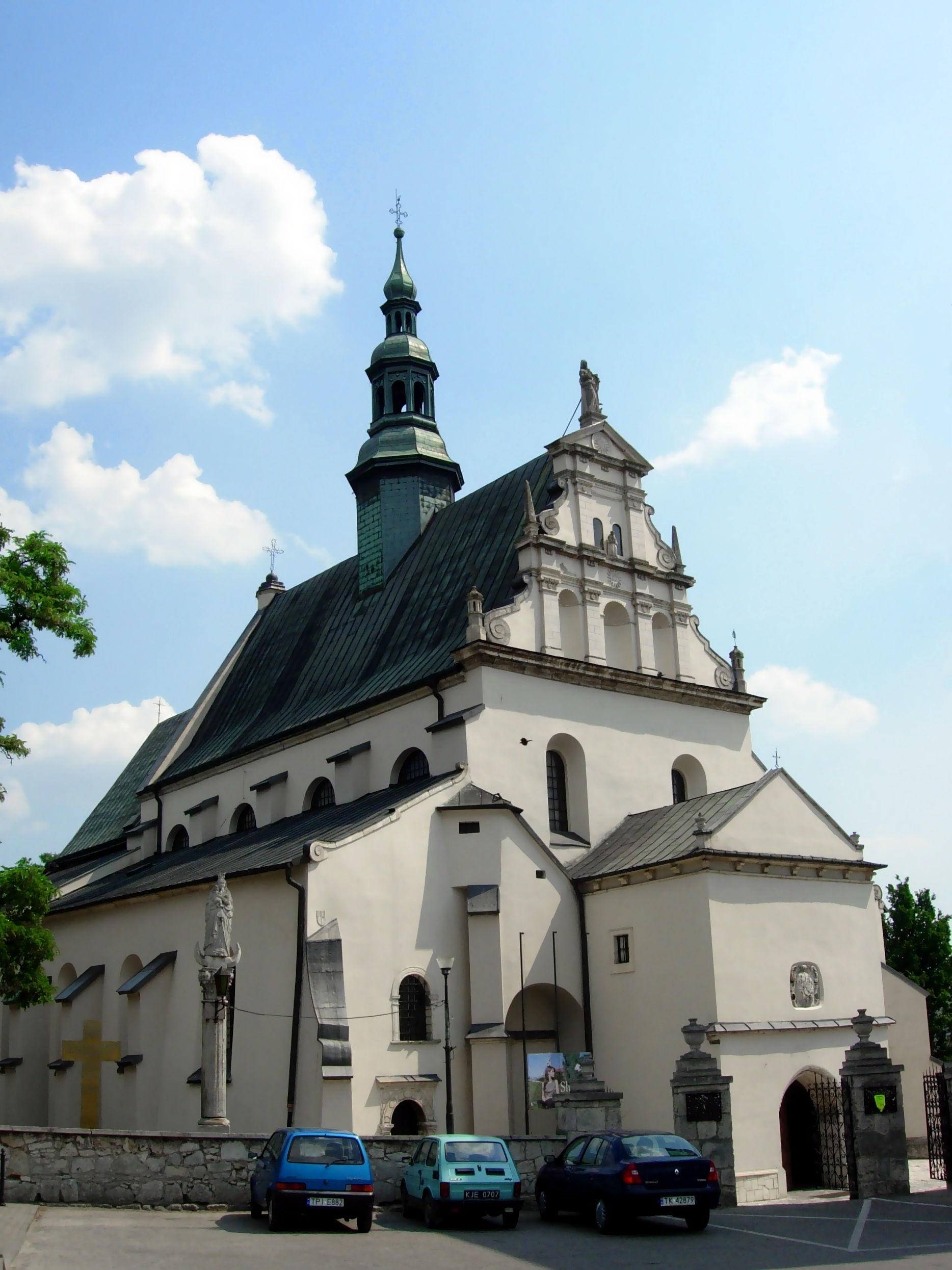

The Church of St. John the Evangelist is a church in Pińczów in Poland. It is a listed heritage building.

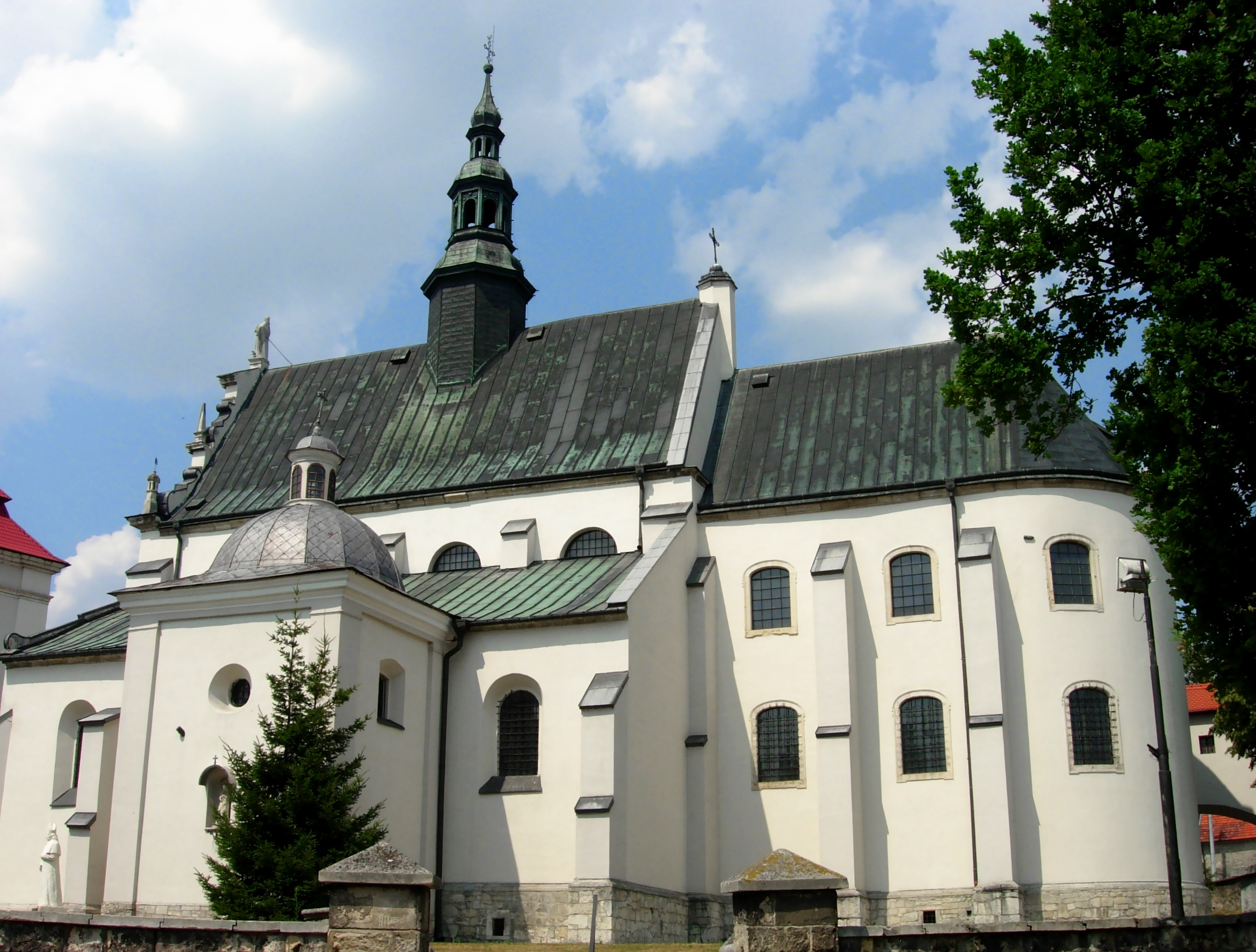
