= Mikołaj Oleśnicki =

Polish noble (died 1556)

Lord Mikołaj Oleśnicki the elder (died 1556) was a Polish Calvinist nobleman who established the first Protestant academy in Poland. His wife Zofia Oleśnicka (died c. 1567) was the first notable Polish woman poet.

The ex-priest Francesco Stancaro prevailed on Oleśnicki to drive the monks out of his settlement at Pińczów in 1550 and establish it as a Calvinist centre, the Pińczów Academy. He corresponded with Melanchthon in 1560.

His nephew was Mikołaj Oleśnicki the younger (30 April 1558 – 13 December 1629). Initially a Calvinist, he converted in 1598 to Roman Catholicism to gain royal favor.
