= Marius Sudol =

American cellular biologist (born 1954)

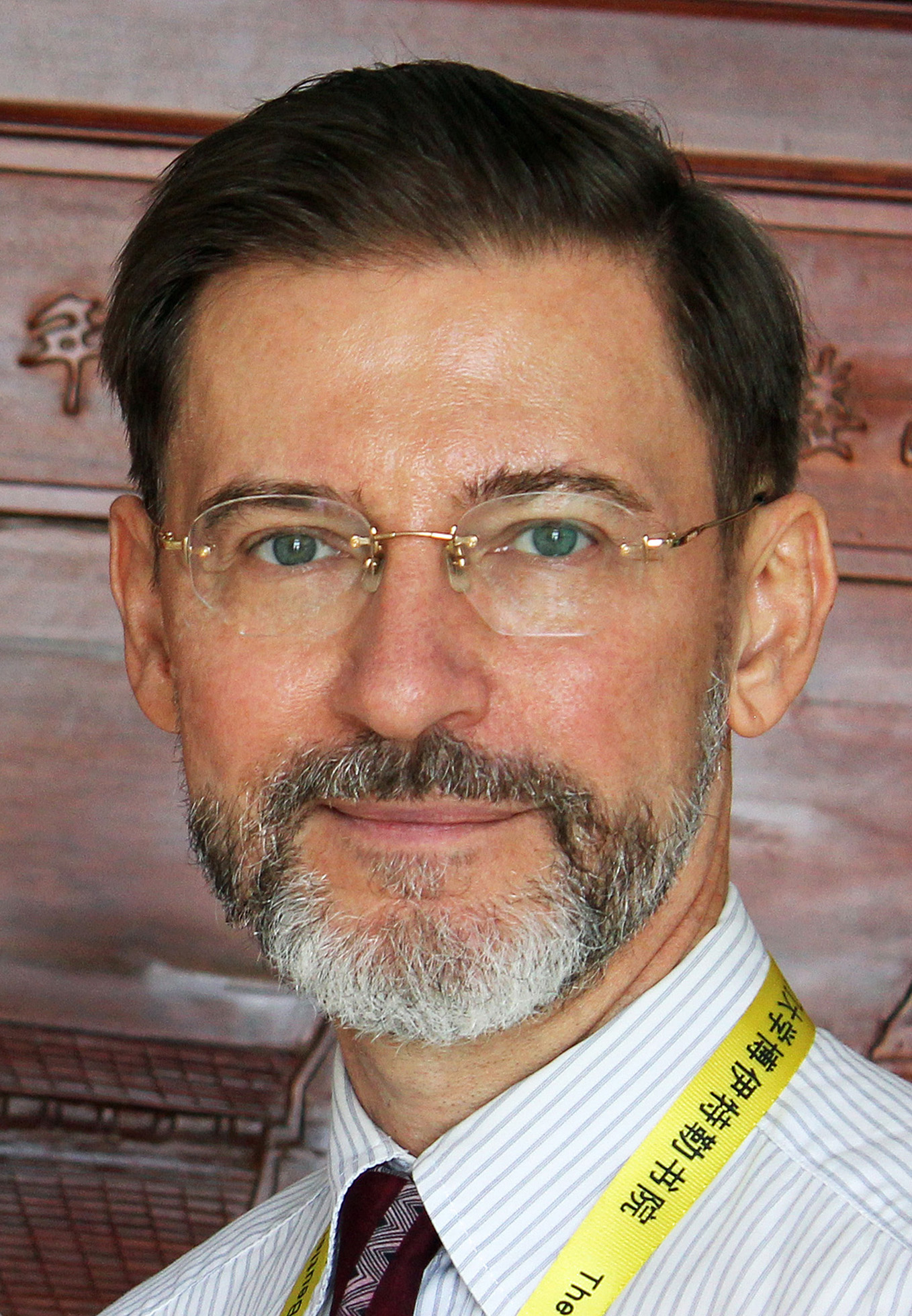
- Sudol in 2016
- Born: 15 November 1954 (age 71); Tarnów, Poland
- Education: The Rockefeller University
- Known for: Modular Protein Domains
- Scientific career
- Fields: Molecular & Cellular Biology
- Workplaces: National University of Singapore; Geisinger Medical Center; Mount Sinai School of Medicine
- Academic advisors: Andrzej Klein, Edward Reich, Wolf-Dieter Schleuning, Hidesaburo Hanafusa, Paul Klotman

Marius Sudol is an American molecular and cellular biologist. He was born in 1954 in Tarnow, Poland. In 1978, he immigrated to the United States to study at The Rockefeller University in New York City, where he received his Ph.D. in 1983. He is currently an Adjunct Faulty at the Icahn School of Medicine at Mount Sinai in NYC.

== Research ==
Sudol's research was mainly focused on cell signaling, oncogenes, and mechanobiology. The key goal of his research team has been to understand signaling modalities of WW domain-containing YAP (aka YAP1) oncoprotein and crosstalk of other WW domain-containing proteins in the Hippo-YAP/TAZ tumor suppressor pathway. He is known for his work on modular protein domains. Among his 180 published papers, he has a number of highly cited articles, which have been referenced collectively more than 18,000 times. His H-index is 83.

== Career and service ==
Besides his academic affiliations in the US and Singapore, Sudol served in the Scientific Advisory Board of AxCell-Cytogen company from 2000 - 2003. and was a co-founder and co-leader of the Protein Modules Consortium from 2003 - 2018. From 2016 to 2019, he taught at The Beutler Institute in Xiamen University, China.

== Honors, fellowships and grant awards ==
- Graduated magna cum laude, Jagiellonian University (1978)
- Graduate Student Fellowship from Merinoff Cancer Fund (1982-1983)
- Damon Runyon-Walter Winchell Cancer Fund Fellowship (1983-1985)
- Klingenstein Award in the Neurosciences (1991-1994)
- NIH Research Career Development Award from National Cancer Institute (1991-1996)
- Human Frontier Science Program Grant Award (1993-1996)
- Human Frontier Science Program Grant Award (with Stan Fields; 2000–2003)
