= Pontifical Academy of the Immaculate Conception =

The Pontifical Academy of the Immaculate Conception or Pontifical Academy of (Mary) Immaculate, Italian: Pontificia Accademia dell'Immacolata, was an academic honorary society established in Rome by the Catholic Church for the advancement of the Marian dogma of Immaculate Conception.

The Academy was established in 1835 and in 1847 was recognised by the Holy See as The Academy of the Immaculate Conception of the Virgin Mary. Seven years later, in 1854, Pope Pius IX proclaimed the Immaculate Conception as a dogma of faith which gave the new academy additional legitimacy and purpose.

4 December 2012: with the "Rescritto ex Audientia SS.mi" Pope Benedict XVI unified the Academy with the Pontifical Academy of Mary.

== See also ==
- Pontifical Academy of Mary
- Pontifical Academy
- Roman Academies
