= Johannes Wolf (theologian) =

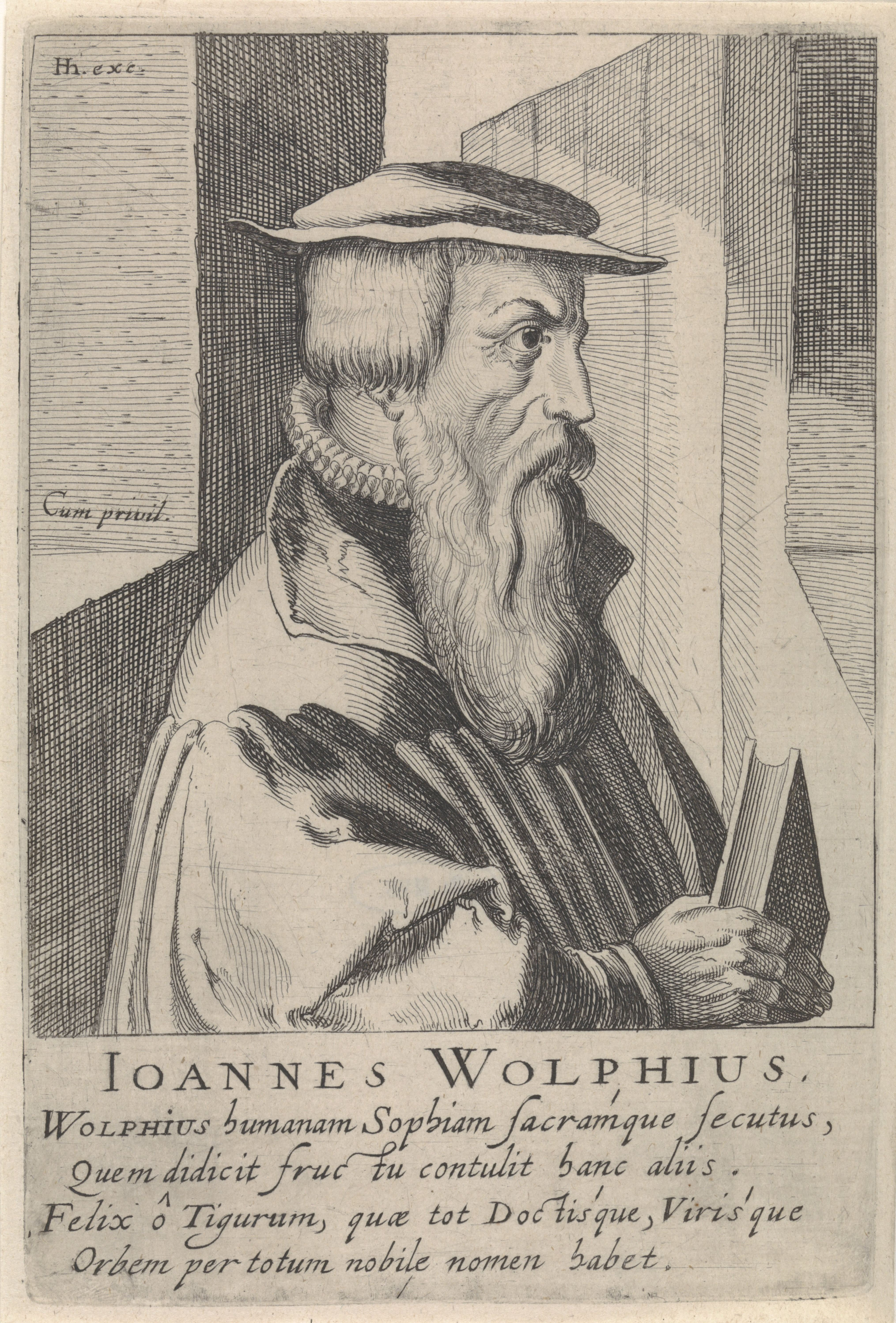
Johannes Wolf

Johannes Wolf (1521–1572) was a Swiss Reformed theologian.

== Life ==
Johannes Wolf was born in Zurich in the year 1521. He became the chaplain of the Zurich hospital in 1544. He received a ministerial position of at the Fraumünster in 1551. In 1565 he became theology professor at the Carolinum in Zürich, also known as the Zurich Academy or Lectorium. He died in 1572.

Wolf was an important acolyte of Heinrich Bullinger in the 1550s and 1560s. With Bullinger and Rudolf Gwalther he intervened unsuccessfully on behalf of Thomas Erastus and the general Zwinglian conception of church-state relations in the Electorate of the Palatinate church discipline controversy of the late 1560s.

Wolf's colleague Johann Wilhelm Stucki composed a biography of him upon his death.

== Works ==
- Tabulae chronologicae in Nehemiam et Esdram (Zürich 1570)
- Considerationes in aliquot libros veteris testamenti
- Fundamentum Lutheranae doctrinae de ubiquitate corporis Christi
- Index graecorum nominum, quae ad geographiam pertinent
- De conferendis bibliorum translationibus
- De conficiendis succinctis commentariis in biblia
- De christiana perseverantia, commentat. consolatoriae ad fratres captivos (Zürich 1578)
- In Esrae Librum prim. Commentarior. Libri III (Zürich 1584)
- In Deuteronomium Sermonum Libri IV (Zürich 1585)
- In historiam Josuae de occupatione et divisione Terrae Sanctae Liber (Zürich 1592)
- Responsio ad Andr. Dudithii quaestionem: ubi vera et catholica ecclesia invenienda sit
- de ecclesia militante
- de constitutione scholae Tigurinae
- Gebetbuch vom Reich Messiä
- Der Christen Sabbath
- Petri Glaube
- de petra salutis
