= Działoszyce =

Town in Świętokrzyskie Voivodeship, Poland

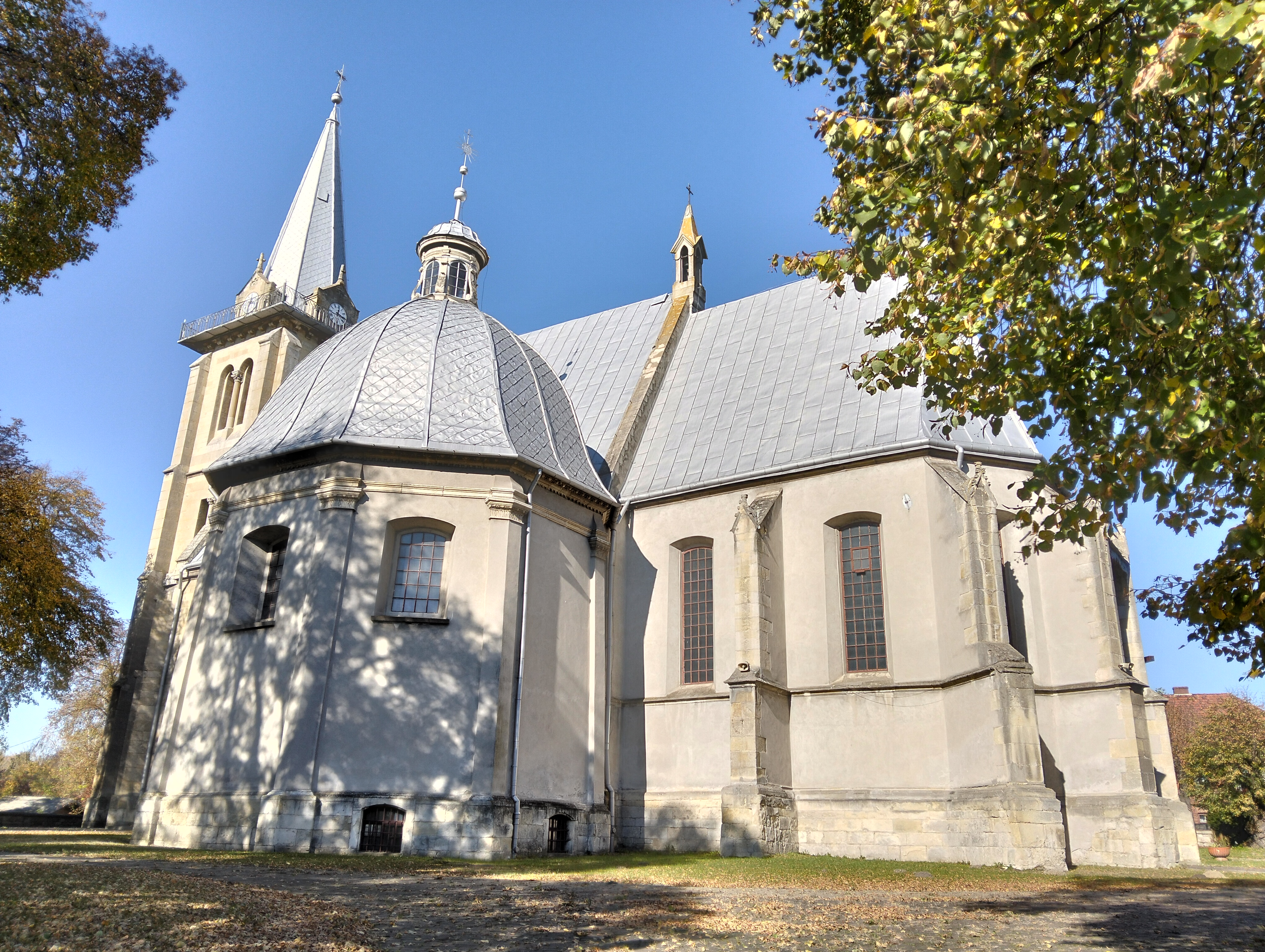
- Gothic Holy Trinity Church

- Coat of arms

- Location within Poland
- Coordinates: 50°22′N 20°21′E
- Country: Poland
- Voivodeship: Świętokrzyskie
- County: Pińczów
- Gmina: Działoszyce
- First mentioned: 1220
- Town rights: 1409

Government
  - Mayor: Stanisław Porada (Ind.)

Area
  - Total: 4.71 km^{2} (1.82 sq mi)

Population (31 December 2021)
  - Total: 2,882
  - Density: 612/km^{2} (1,580/sq mi)
- Time zone: UTC+1 (CET)
  - Summer (DST): UTC+2 (CEST)
- Postal code: 28-400
- Area code: +48 41
- Car plates: TPI
- Website: http://www.dzialoszyce.pl

Działoszyce [d͡ʑawɔˈʂɨt͡sɛ] is a town in Pińczów County in Świętokrzyskie Voivodeship, in southern Poland, with 2,882 inhabitants as of December 2023.

== History ==
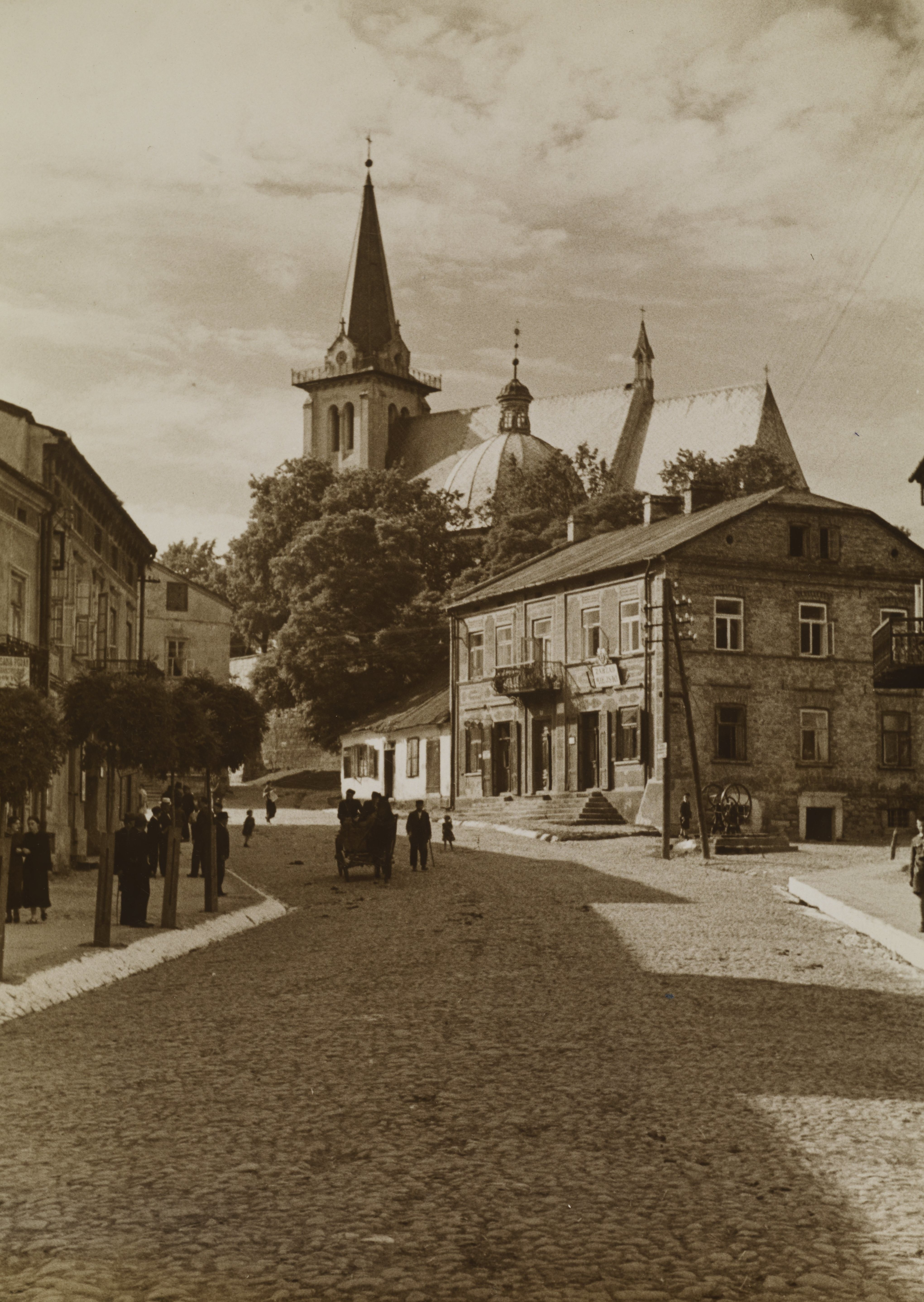
Działoszyce in c. 1936

The town is located in historic Lesser Poland, and the earliest mention of Działoszyce in historical records comes from 1220. Działoszyce, located on the Nidzica river (a tributary to the Vistula), was in the Middle Ages placed along a merchant route from Kraków to Wiślica. The settlement prospered due to the protection of bishop of Kraków Iwo Odrowąż, and King Casimir III the Great. In 1409, Działoszyce was granted Magdeburg rights by King Władysław II Jagiełło. The town was administratively located in the Sandomierz Voivodeship in the Lesser Poland Province, and it belonged to the Ostrogski family, which collected tolls for crossing the river bridge. In the Polish–Lithuanian Commonwealth, Działoszyce was a local trade and craft center. In 1629 the town had 13 artisans and a mill. In 1662 it had 468 inhabitants and had the right to organize 12 fairs a year.

In 1795, following the Third Partition of Poland, Działoszyce was first annexed by Austria. After the Polish victory in the Austro-Polish War of 1809, it became part of the short-lived Duchy of Warsaw, and after the duchy's dissolution in 1815, it became part of Russian-controlled Congress Poland. The town saw an influx of Jews as a result of Russian discriminatory policies (see Pale of Settlement). By 1820 the town had 1,692 inhabitants, 74% of whom were Jews.

In the Second Polish Republic, Działoszyce belonged to Kielce Voivodeship and in the 1920s and 1930s, the number of inhabitants decreased from 6,755 (in 1920) to 5,872 (1939). According to the 1921 census the town had a Jewish community consisting of 5,618 people, or 83.6 percent of its total population.

=== World War II ===
Following the German-Soviet invasion of Poland, which started World War II in September 1939, the town was occupied by Germany. Several Poles, who were either born or lived and worked in Działoszyce, were murdered by the Russians in the Katyn massacre in 1940.

About 7,000 Jews lived in the town at the beginning of the war, a number that increased significantly as refugees fled from other places or were deported, to Działoszyce. On arrival, the Germans began robbing and terrorizing the Jewish population. They were crammed together in unsanitary conditions, often without running water. For example, 1,000 people were housed in the synagogue and adjoining hall. In 1941, both typhoid and typhus epidemics spread throughout the community but a valiant Jewish doctor established processes of sanitation and disinfection. Some Jews were kidnapped and sent to forced labor camps. In early September 1942, the Jews were rounded up. The old and weak were taken to the cemetery in carts driven by Polish peasants under German orders. At least 1,200 were machine-gunned to death there. Most of the rest were sent by train to Belzec where they were immediately gassed. A few were sent to a labor camp. Several younger Jews fled to the forest and joined partisan groups fighting the Germans. By the end of the war, fewer than 200 survived. Actions in Dzialoszyce were typical of the actions in other Polish towns as part of the Holocaust.

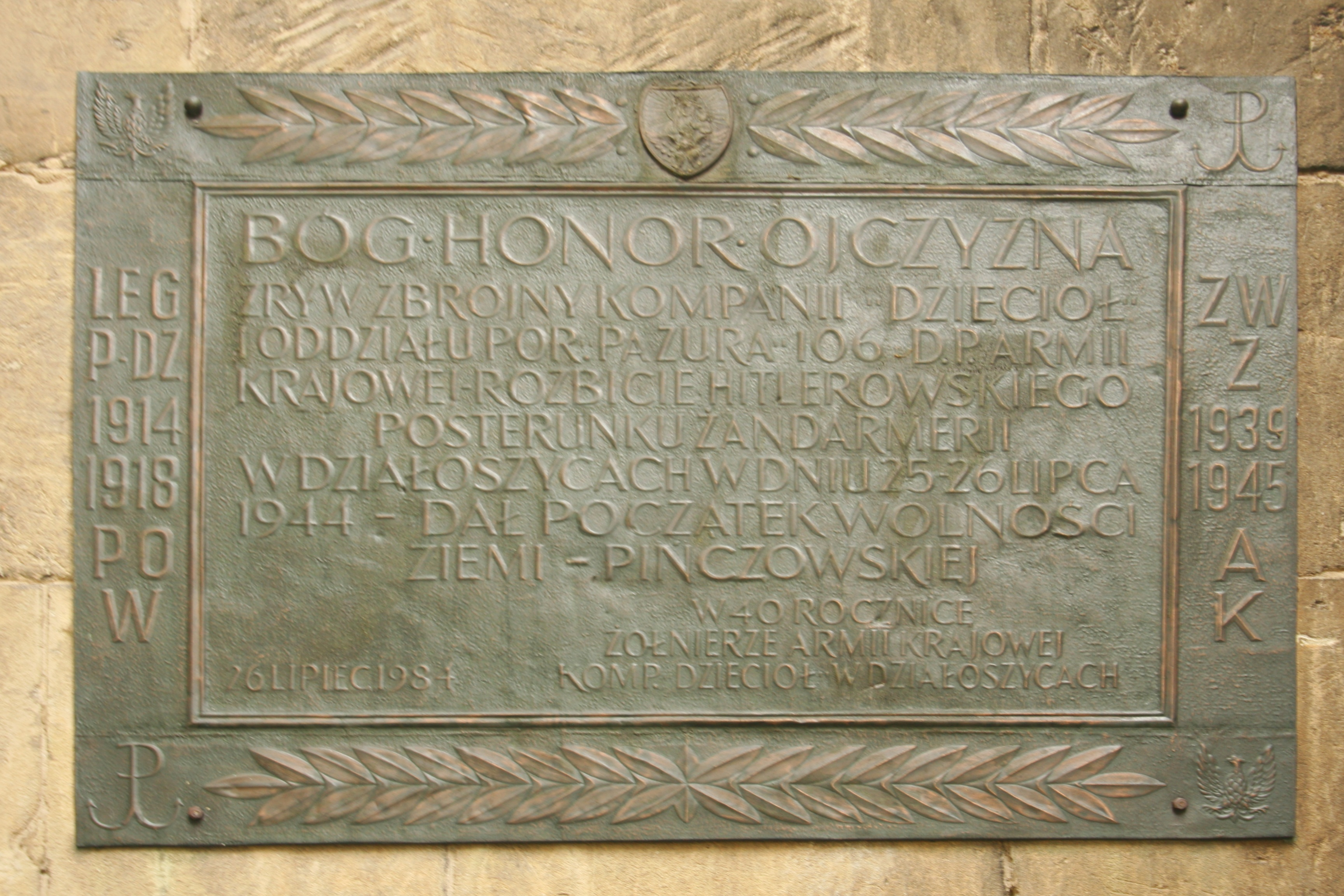
Plaque commemorating the liberation of Działoszyce by Polish partisans in 1944

The Polish resistance movement was active in the town, including a local unit of the Home Army under the cryptonym "Dzięcioł" ("Woodpecker"). On 26 July 1944, the town was liberated by Polish partisans of the Home Army, and then formed part of the short-lived Polish "Kazimierza-Proszowice Partisan Republic".

In 1946, the population of the town was 2,506.

== Transport ==
Działoszyce lies along national road 768.

The nearest railway station is in Słomniki.

== Sights ==
Among points of interest, there are the parish church of the Holy Trinity (1222, frequently remodeled) and the ruins of a synagogue from 1852.
