= Pińczów =

Town in Świętokrzyskie Voivodeship, Poland

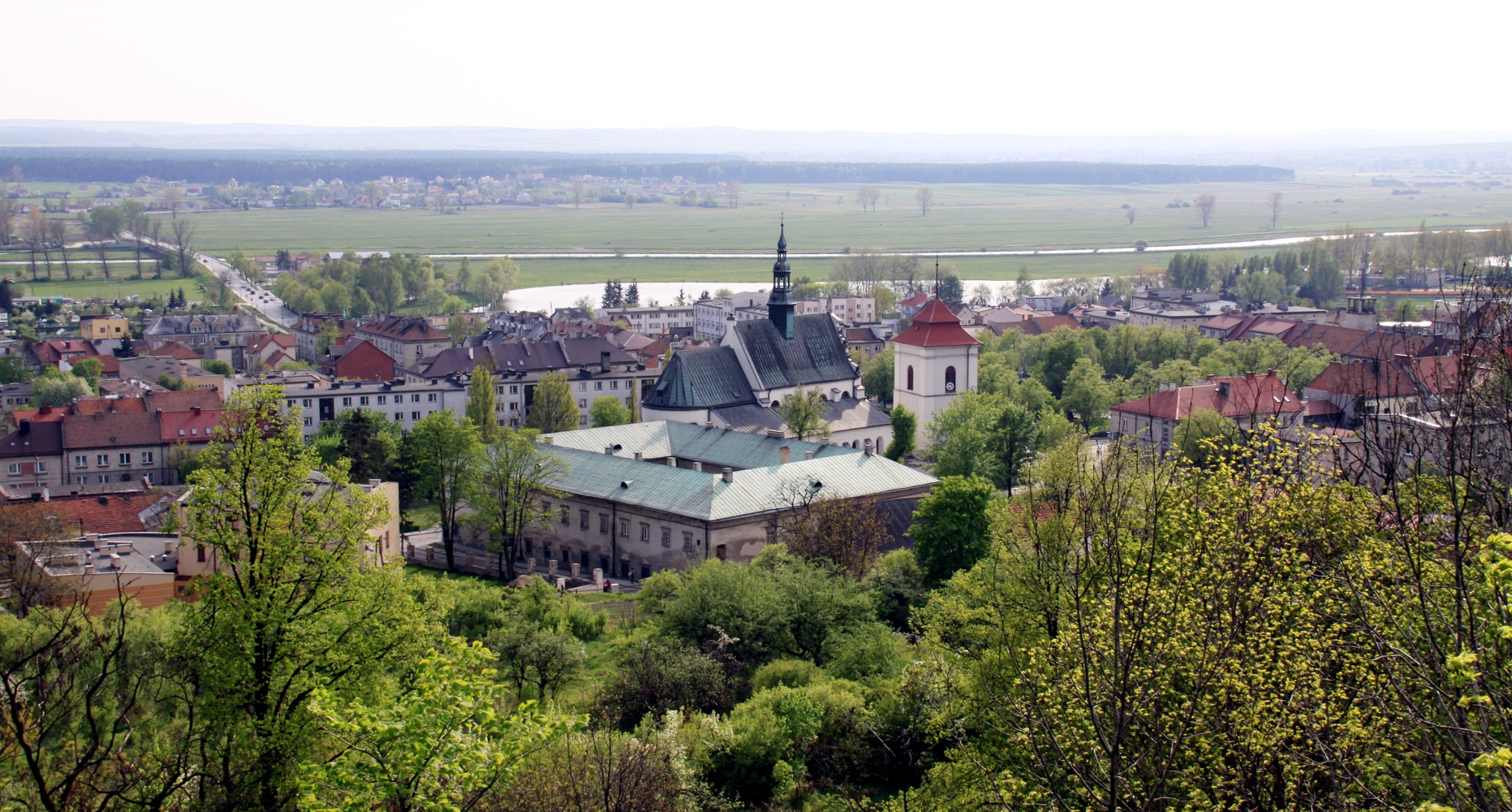
- Pińczów panorama

- Coat of arms

- Location within Poland
- Coordinates: 50°32′N 20°32′E
- Country: Poland
- Voivodeship: Świętokrzyskie
- County: Pińczów
- Gmina: Pińczów
- Town rights: 1428

Area
  - Total: 14.32 km^{2} (5.53 sq mi)
- Elevation: 300 m (980 ft)

Population (2013)
  - Total: 11,303
  - Density: 789.3/km^{2} (2,044/sq mi)
- Time zone: UTC+1 (CET)
  - Summer (DST): UTC+2 (CEST)
- Postal code: 28–400
- Area code: +48 41
- Car plates: TPI
- Website: http://www.pinczow.com.pl/

Pińczów (pronounced [ˈpʲiɲt͡ʂuf]) is a town in southern Poland, in Świętokrzyskie Voivodeship. It lies approximately 40 km (25 mi) south of Kielce. It is the capital of Pińczów County. The population is 10,946 (2018). Pińczów belongs to the historical region of Lesser Poland (Polish: Małopolska) and lies in the valley of the river Nida.

== History ==
In the 12th century in the location of current Pińczów there was a quarry. The miners working at the quarry probably resided in a gord, which was destroyed in 1241, during the first Mongol invasion of Poland. In the first half of the 14th century a Gothic castle was erected in the spot where once the gord stood. At the foot of the castle, a settlement appeared, initially called Piedziców, Pandziczów and (1470), Pyandzyczów. The name Pińczów has been in use since the 16th century, and it is not known who was first owner of the settlement. In 1424, it belonged to the powerful Oleśnicki family, which built its residence here, and funded a Pauline monks abbey (1449). On September 21, 1428 in Lublin, King Władysław II Jagiełło granted town charter to Pińczów.

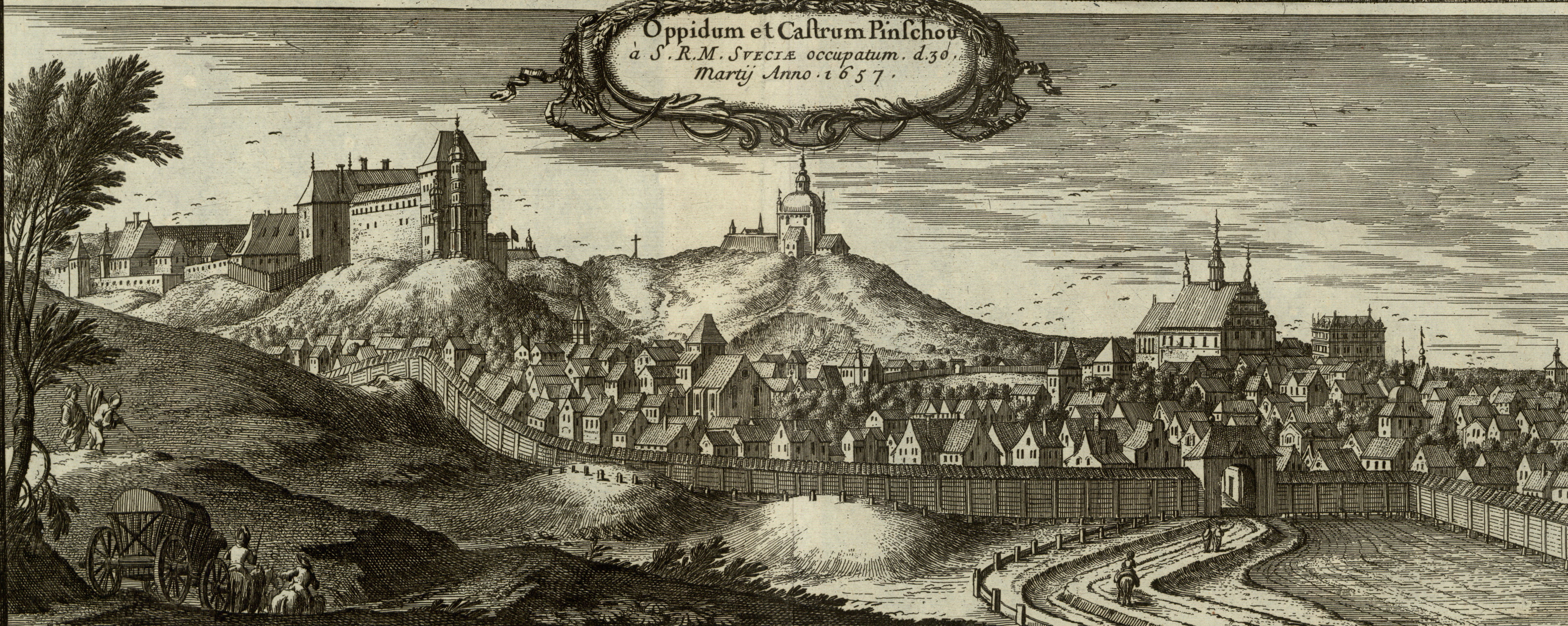
Pińczów in the mid-17th century

In the mid-16th century, Pińczów became one of main centers of Protestant Reformation in Lesser Poland. The Calvinist nobleman Nicholas Oleśnicki drove out the Catholic monks of Pińczów in 1550 at the instigation of the Italian ex-priest Francesco Stancaro, creating a Calvinist centre, where the Synods of Pińczów were held 1550–1563. Pińczów is sometimes called the Sarmatian Athens for its association with the Calvinist Academy founded by Francesco Lismanino, to which scholars such as the French grammarian Pierre Statorius were invited. The town was the site of the six years of work 1558–1563 for the translators of the Brest Bible, which is why it is sometimes called the Pińczów Bible.

In 1586 the town was purchased by Bishop of Kraków Piotr Myszkowski, who initiated the program of Counter-Reformation. Pauline monks returned to Pińczów, and in the late 16th century, the Myszkowski family redecorated the castle, turning it into their residence. In 1592, Zygmunt Myszkowski founded a town of Mirów, which in 1612 was absorbed by Pińczów. The town had a defensive wall, with four gates, and a number of foreign artisans, from Italy, Scotland, Germany and France. In 1657, Pińczów was destroyed by Swedish soldiers (see the Deluge), and during the Great Northern War, the town was once again captured by the Swedes; King Charles XII of Sweden stayed here for a while, after the Battle of Kliszów. In the late 18th century, Pińczów was purchased by the Wielopolski family.

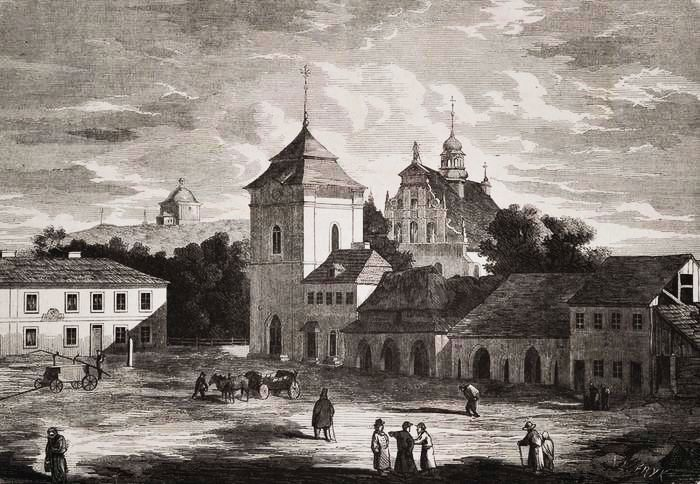
Pińczów in 1865

Following the Third Partition of Poland, it was annexed by the Habsburg Empire (1795). After the Polish victory in the Austro-Polish War of 1809, it was regained by Poles and included within the short-lived Duchy of Warsaw, and after the dissolution of the duchy in 1815, the town became part of Russian-controlled Congress Poland. In the 1820s, the town had some 4,000 inhabitants, and in 1867, the Russians created Pińczów County.

In the Second Polish Republic, Pińczów belonged to Kielce Voivodeship. In the early 1920s, the town was home to the 2nd Legions Infantry Regiment, which was later moved to Sandomierz.

Pińczów was destroyed by the Germans in September 1939 during the Invasion of Poland at the start of World War II, and almost all Jews, who had accounted for about 70% of the town's population, were killed or sent to extermination camps. Most of Pińczów's Jews were murdered in the Treblinka extermination camp. The Jewish cemetery was also destroyed. Some Jews of Pińczów survived the Holocaust by hiding in nearby forests. Some, though not many, were hidden by Polish farmers until the end of the war. The Polish resistance was active in the town and its environs, including the Pińczów district of the Home Army under the cryptonym "Perz". The Republic of Pińczów was a short-lived Polish uprising, which took place in July – August 1944. Units of the Home Army and other underground organizations managed to push Germans from the area of approximately 1,000 km^{2} (390 sq mi), which stretched from Pińczów to Działoszyce, and from Nowy Korczyn to Nowe Brzesko. The resistance was very active here; there were two attacks on a local Gestapo prison, in which hundreds of Poles were freed.

== Main sights ==
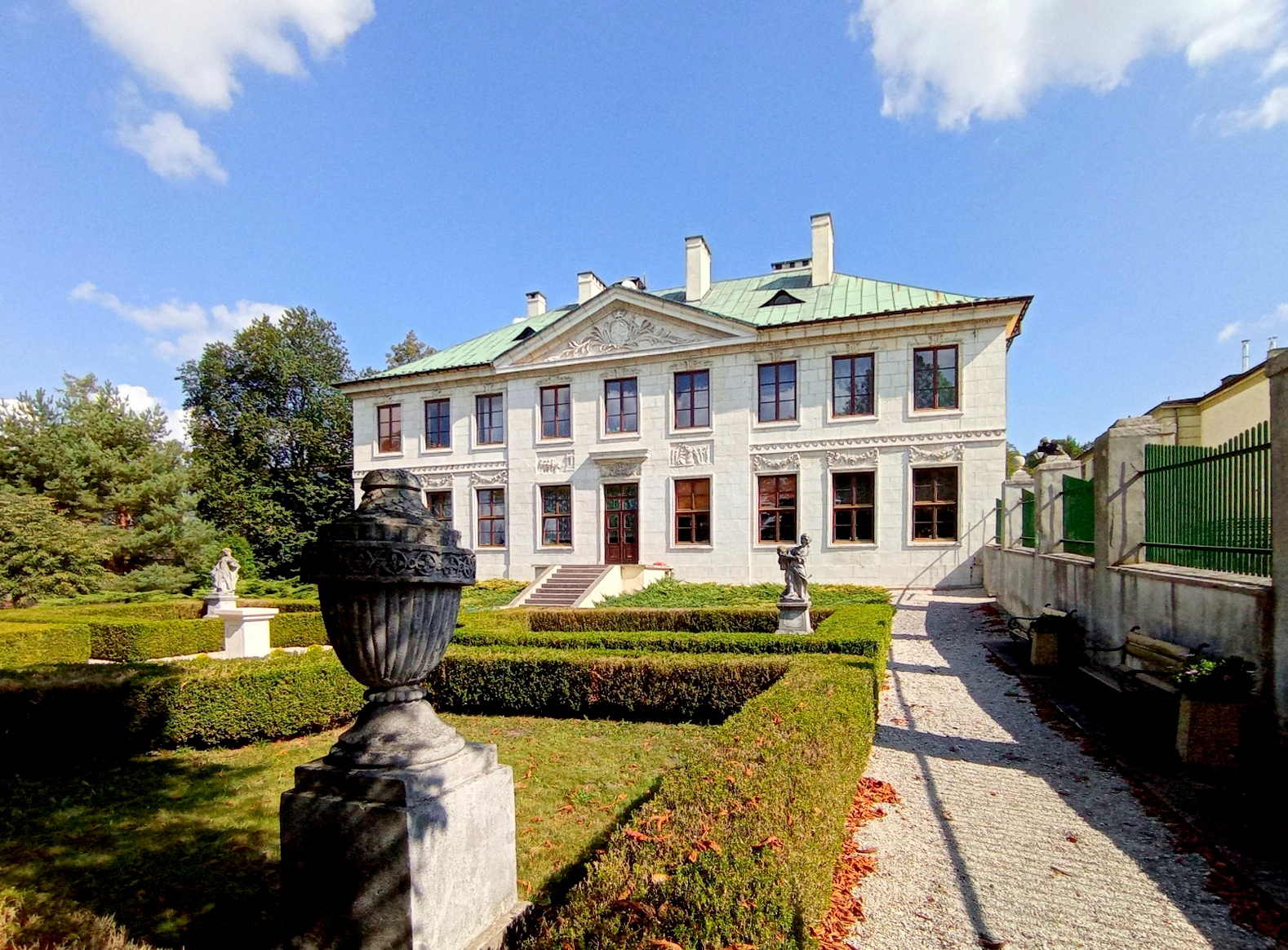
Wielopolski Palace

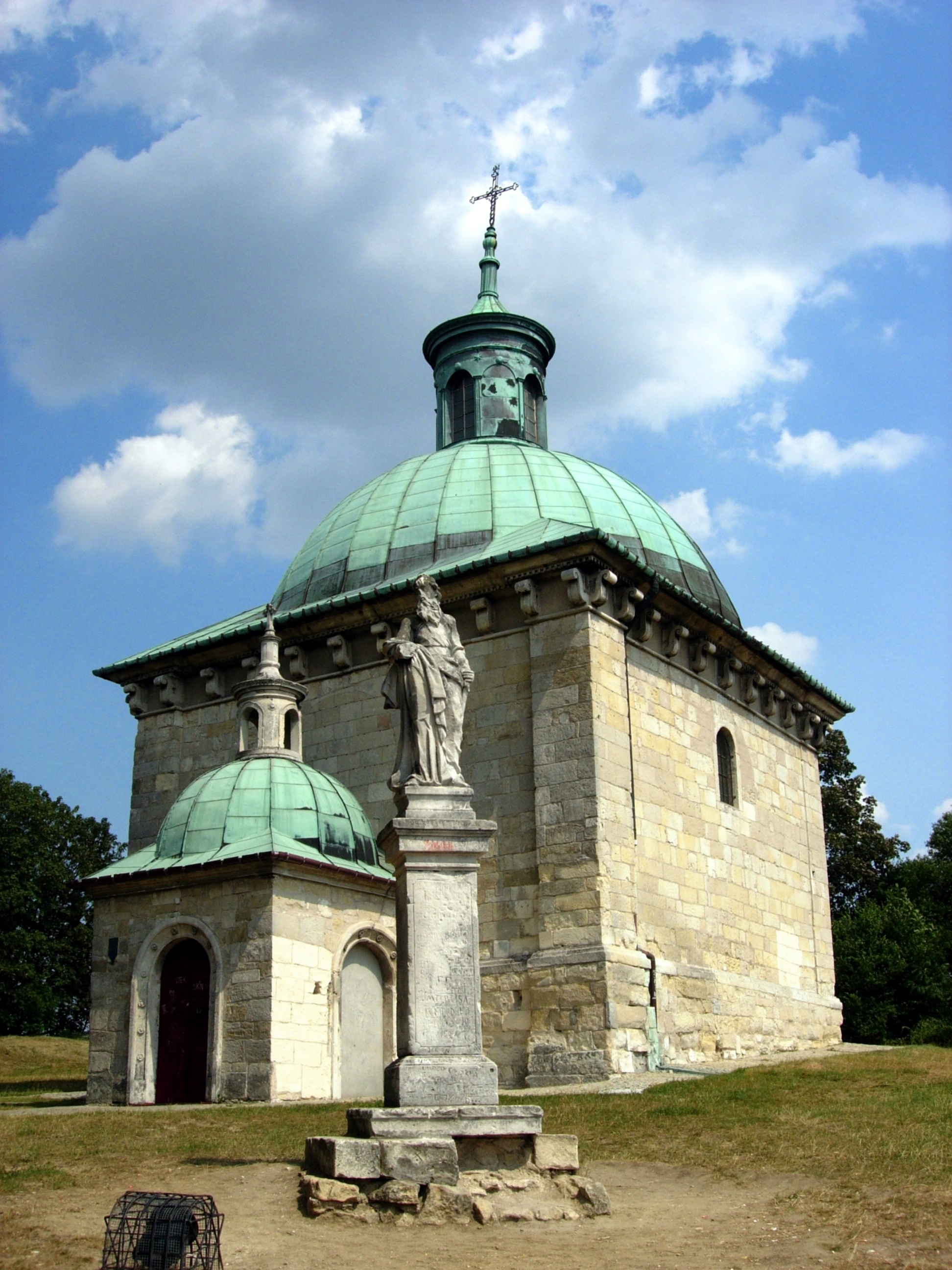
Renaissance St. Anne's Chapel

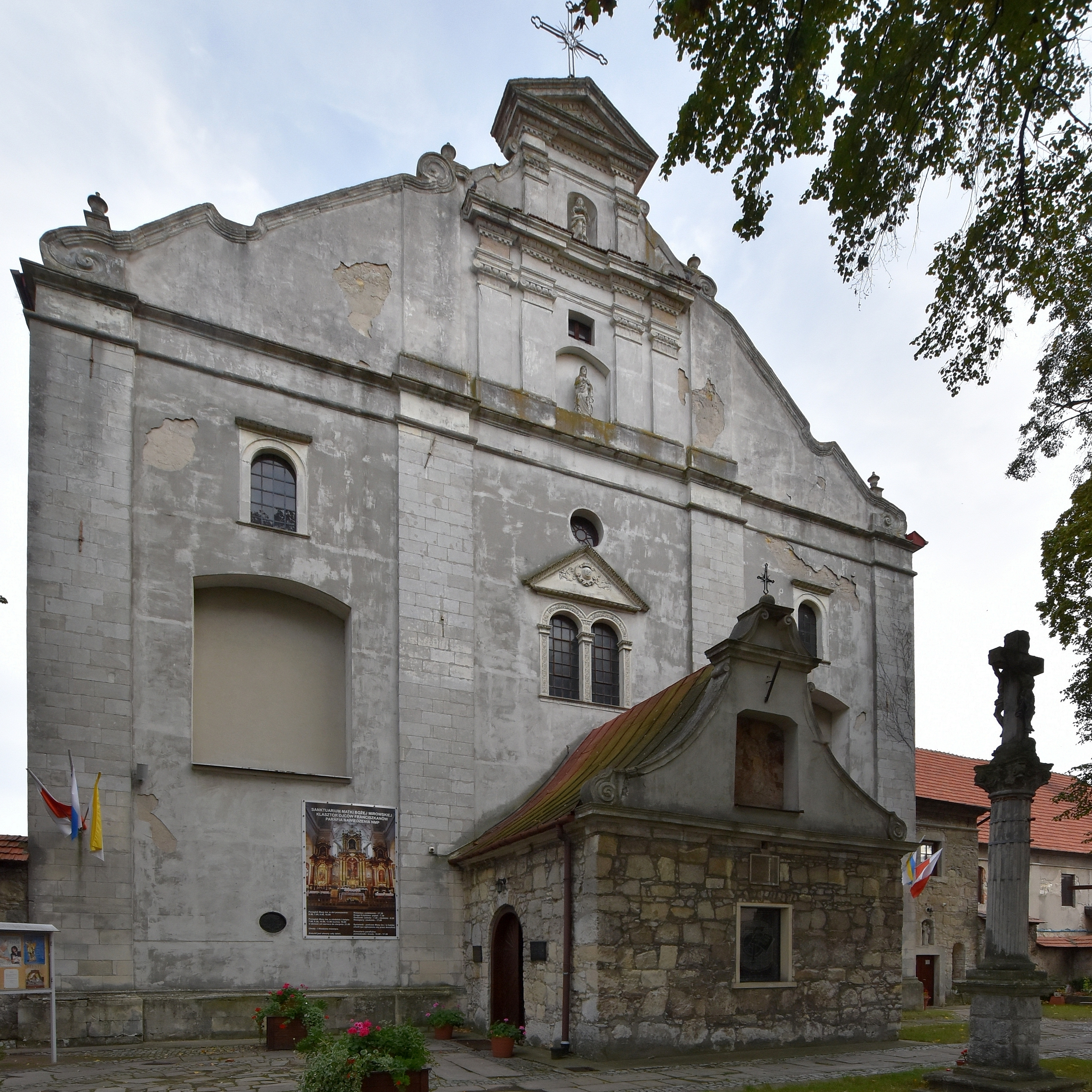
Renaissance Church of the Visitation

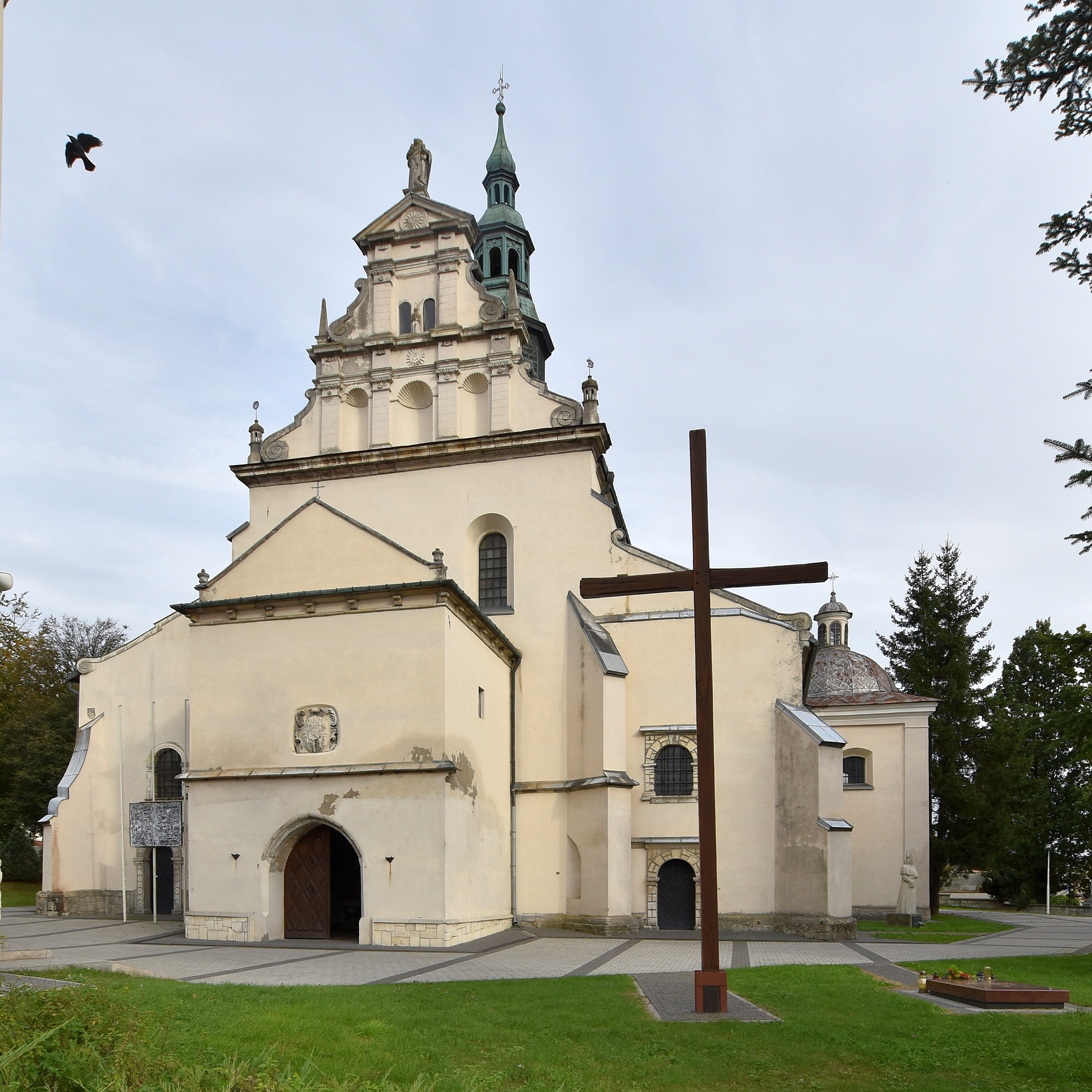
Renaissance Church of St. John the Evangelist

The town's attractions include the 18th-century palace of the Wielkopolski family, several churches and monasteries (some dating back to 15th century), the Renaissance St. Anne's Chapel, the recently restored synagogue, and ruins of the 13th-century castle. The complex of the former Pauline monastery, founded in 1449 by Cardinal Zbigniew Oleśnicki, is located in Pińczów's market square. Currently, it houses a regional museum, a house of culture, and a cinema. In Pińczów's district of Mirów there also was a Franciscan monastery, founded in 1587 by Bishop Piotr Myszkowski. In Mirów there is a house which once was a Calvinist printing shop. Now it houses a branch of the National Archive of Poland.

Mount St. Anne is located in the vicinity of Pińczów.

== Transport ==
Pińczów lies on voivodeship road 766.

The town has a station on a narrow-gauge line, called Holy Cross Mountains Rail.

== Sports ==
The town is home to a sports club Nida Pińczów, which was established in 1946.

== Notable residents ==
- Jan Łaski (1499–1560), theologian, a leading figure of Reformation in Poland
- Andrzej Barański (born 1941), film director
- Adam Jarubas (born 1974), politician
- Andrzej Dziubiński (1947–2019), Polish historian, regionalist writer, history teacher at Primary School No. 1 in Pińczów, councilor of the Pińczów City Council, social activist, researcher of the history and history of Pińczów, PTTK guide.

== Twin towns ==
Pińczów is twinned with:

- Bystřice, Czech Republic
- Svodín, Slovakia
- Tata, Hungary
- Caurdy, France

== See also ==
- Pińczów Academy
