= Pawłowice, Pińczów County =

Pawłowice
- Village
- Location within Poland
- Coordinates: 50°30′24″N 20°27′43″E
- Country: Poland
- Voivodeship: Świętokrzyskie
- County: Pińczów
- Gmina: Michałów

Pawłowice [pavwɔˈvit͡sɛ] is a village in the administrative district of Gmina Michałów, within Pińczów County, Świętokrzyskie Voivodeship, in south-central Poland. It lies approximately 2 km (1 mi) north of Michałów, 6 km (4 mi) south-west of Pińczów, and 44 km (27 mi) south of the regional capital Kielce.
