= Góry, Świętokrzyskie Voivodeship =

Góry
- Village
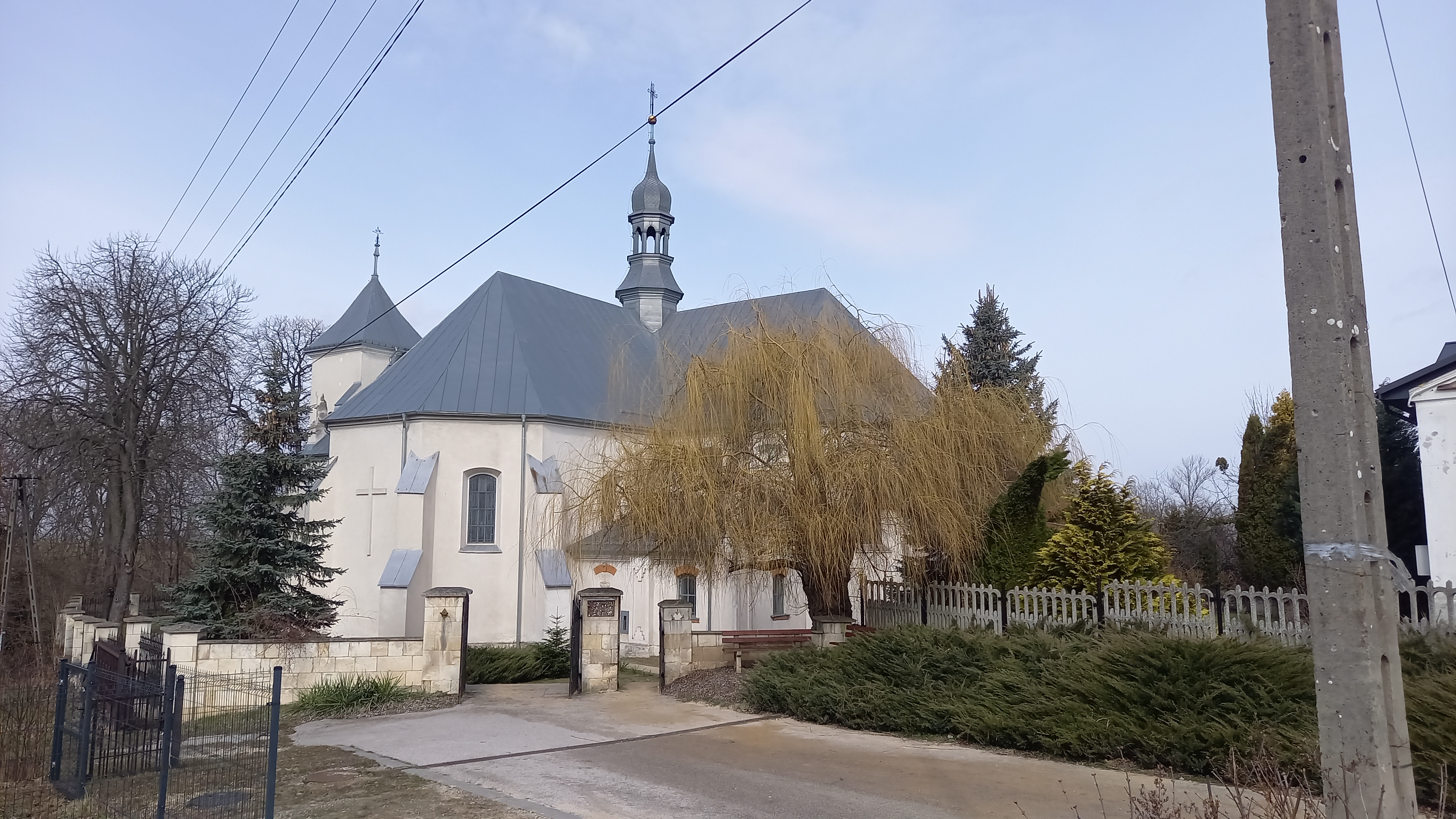
- Church

- Location within Poland
- Coordinates: 50°28′23″N 20°23′59″E
- Country: Poland
- Voivodeship: Świętokrzyskie
- County: Pińczów
- Gmina: Michałów

Góry [ˈɡurɨ] is a village in the administrative district of Gmina Michałów, within Pińczów County, Świętokrzyskie Voivodeship, in south-central Poland. It lies approximately 5 km (3 mi) south-west of Michałów, 12 km (7 mi) south-west of Pińczów, and 49 km (30 mi) south of the regional capital Kielce.
