= Zagajów, Pińczów County =

Zagajów
- Village
- Location within Poland
- Coordinates: 50°29′31″N 20°24′26″E
- Country: Poland
- Voivodeship: Świętokrzyskie
- County: Pińczów
- Gmina: Michałów

Zagajów [zaˈɡajuf] is a village in the administrative district of Gmina Michałów, within Pińczów County, Świętokrzyskie Voivodeship, in south-central Poland. It lies approximately 4 km (2 mi) west of Michałów, 11 km (7 mi) south-west of Pińczów, and 46 km (29 mi) south of the regional capital Kielce.
