= Kołków =

- Village
- Location within Poland
- Coordinates: 50°27′37″N 20°26′31″E
- Country: Poland
- Voivodeship: Świętokrzyskie
- County: Pińczów
- Gmina: Michałów

Kołków [ˈkɔu̯kuf] is a village in the administrative district of Gmina Michałów, within Pińczów County, Świętokrzyskie Voivodeship, in south-central Poland. It lies approximately 4 km (2 mi) south of Michałów, 11 km (7 mi) south-west of Pińczów, and 49 km (30 mi) south of the regional capital Kielce.
