= Sadkówka =

- Village
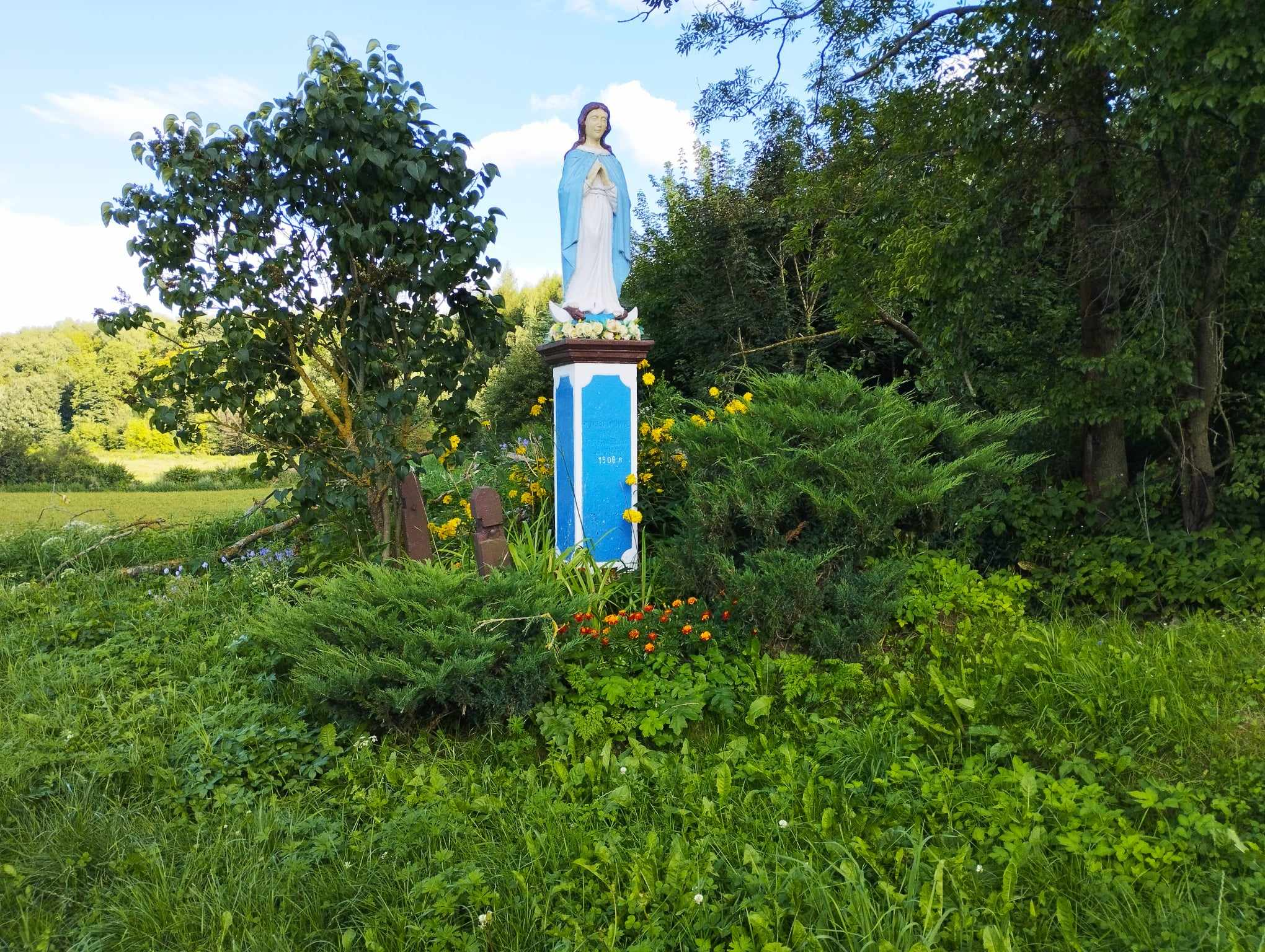
- Shrine

- Location within Poland
- Coordinates: 50°27′N 20°25′E
- Country: Poland
- Voivodeship: Świętokrzyskie
- County: Pińczów
- Gmina: Michałów

Sadkówka [satˈkufka] is a village located in the administrative district of Gmina Michałów, within Pińczów County, Świętokrzyskie Voivodeship, in south-central Poland. It lies approximately 6 km (4 mi) south-west of Michałów, 13 km (8 mi) south-west of Pińczów, and 51 km (32 mi) south of the regional capital, Kielce.
