= Tur Górny =

- Village
- Location within Poland
- Coordinates: 50°33′N 20°24′E
- Country: Poland
- Voivodeship: Świętokrzyskie
- County: Pińczów
- Gmina: Michałów

Tur Górny [ˈtur ˈɡurnɨ] is a village in the administrative district of Gmina Michałów, within Pińczów County, Świętokrzyskie Voivodeship, in south-central Poland. It lies approximately 8 km (5 mi) north-west of Michałów, 10 km (6 mi) west of Pińczów, and 41 km (25 mi) south of the regional capital Kielce.
