= Jelcza Wielka =

- Village
- Location within Poland
- Coordinates: 50°29′56″N 20°25′17″E
- Country: Poland
- Voivodeship: Świętokrzyskie
- County: Pińczów
- Gmina: Michałów

Jelcza Wielka [ˈjɛlt͡ʂa ˈvjɛlka] is a village in the administrative district of Gmina Michałów, within Pińczów County, Świętokrzyskie Voivodeship, in south-central Poland. It lies approximately 3 km (2 mi) west of Michałów, 9 km (6 mi) south-west of Pińczów, and 45 km (28 mi) south of the regional capital Kielce.
