= Jelcza Mała =

- Village
- Location within Poland
- Coordinates: 50°29′53″N 20°25′59″E
- Country: Poland
- Voivodeship: Świętokrzyskie
- County: Pińczów
- Gmina: Michałów

Jelcza Mała [ˈjɛlt͡ʂa ˈmawa] is a village in the administrative district of Gmina Michałów, within Pińczów County, Świętokrzyskie Voivodeship, in south-central Poland. It lies approximately 2 km (1 mi) west of Michałów, 9 km (6 mi) south-west of Pińczów, and 45 km (28 mi) south of the regional capital Kielce.
