= Sędowice, Świętokrzyskie Voivodeship =

Sędowice
- Village
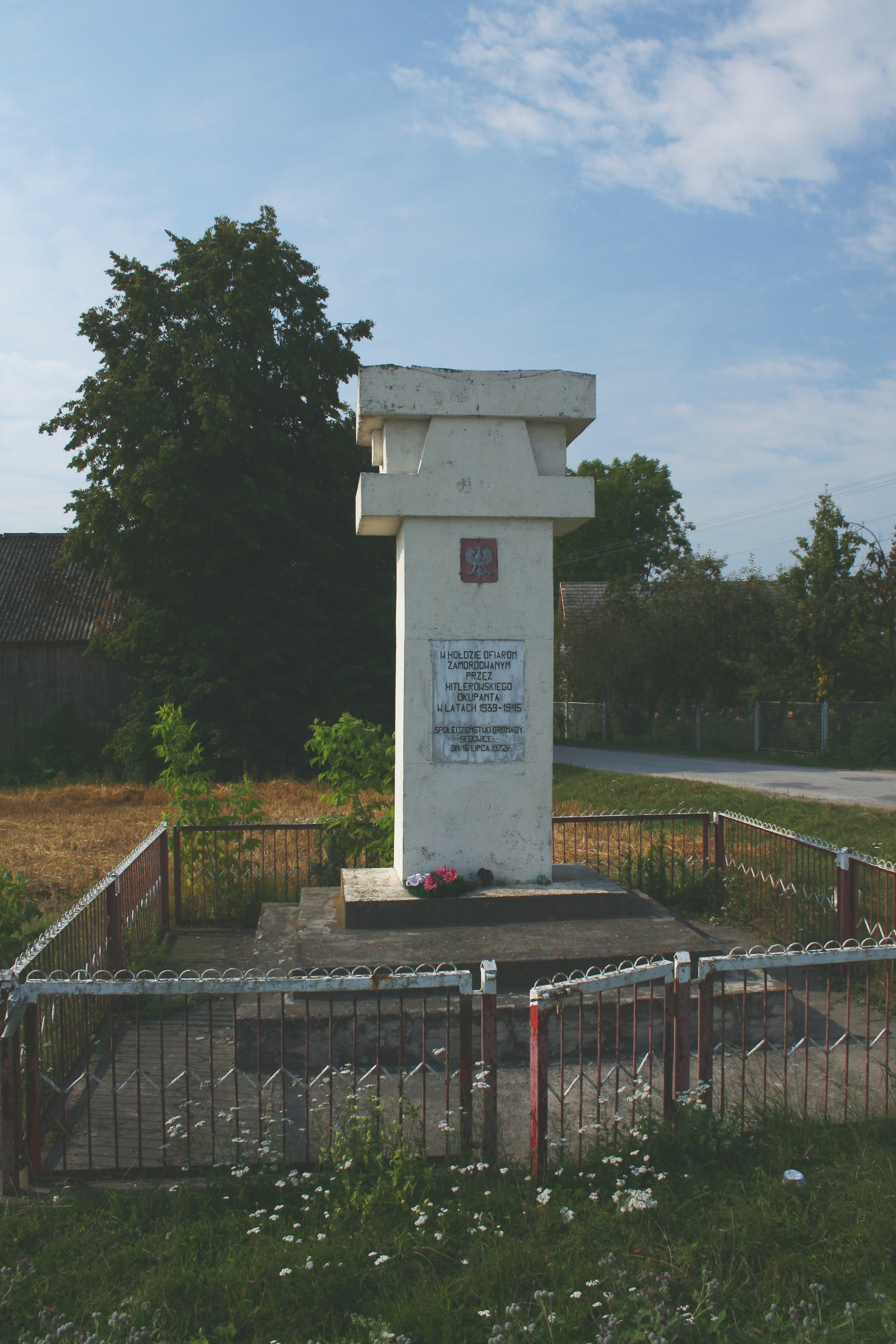
- Monument

- Location within Poland
- Coordinates: 50°30′17″N 20°21′38″E
- Country: Poland
- Voivodeship: Świętokrzyskie
- County: Pińczów
- Gmina: Michałów
- Website: http://michalow.pl

Sędowice [sɛndɔˈvit͡sɛ] is a village in the administrative district of Gmina Michałów, within Pińczów County, Świętokrzyskie Voivodeship, in south-central Poland. It lies approximately 8 km (5 mi) west of Michałów, 13 km (8 mi) west of Pińczów, and 46 km (29 mi) south-west of the regional capital Kielce.
