= Karolów, Świętokrzyskie Voivodeship =

Karolów
- Village
- Location within Poland
- Coordinates: 50°28′N 20°23′E
- Country: Poland
- Voivodeship: Świętokrzyskie
- County: Pińczów
- Gmina: Michałów

Karolów [kaˈrɔluf] is a village in the administrative district of Gmina Michałów, within Pińczów County, Świętokrzyskie Voivodeship, in south-central Poland. It lies approximately 7 km (4 mi) south-west of Michałów, 13 km (8 mi) south-west of Pińczów, and 50 km (31 mi) south of the regional capital Kielce.
