= Wrocieryż =

- Village
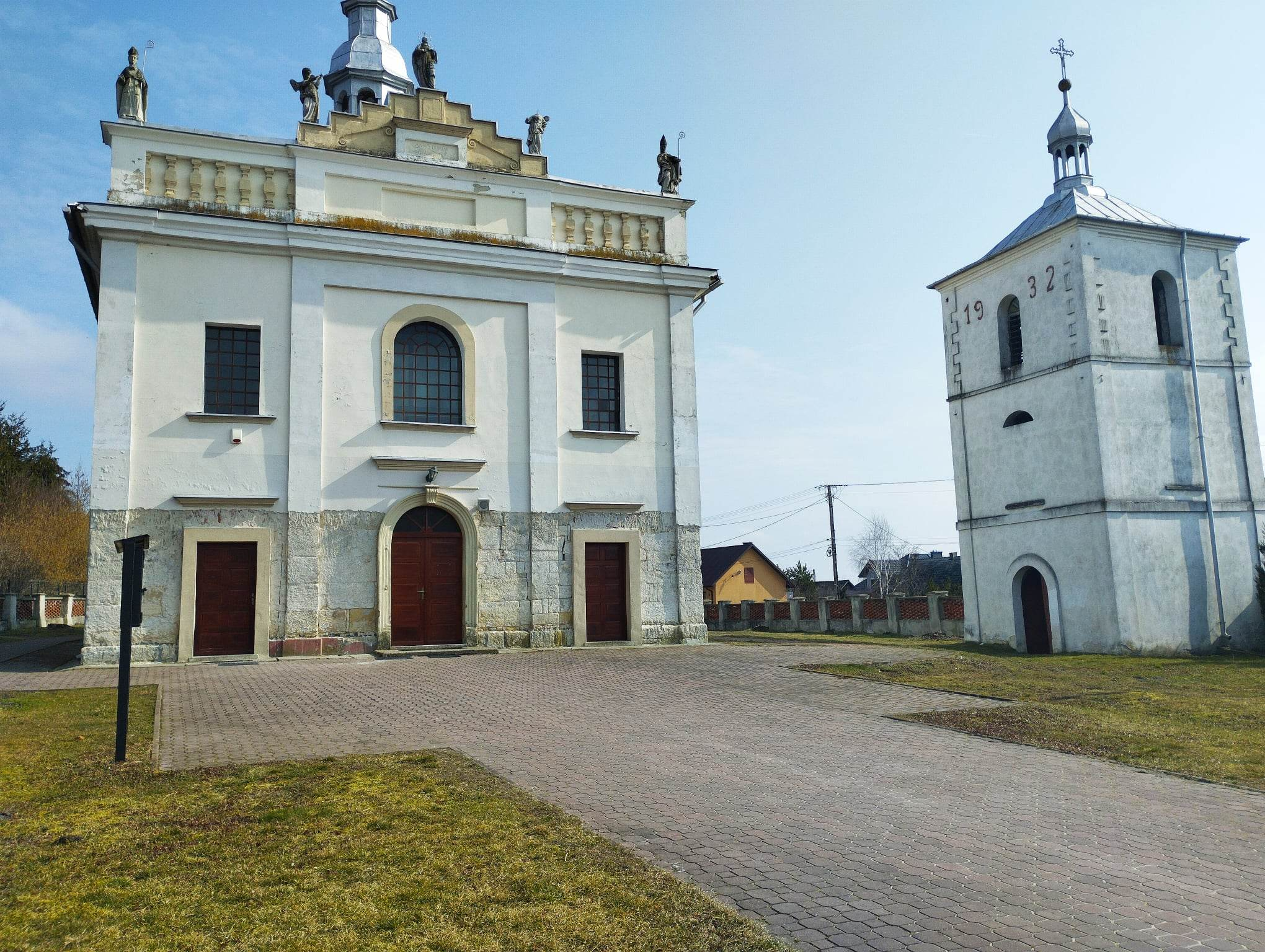
- Church

- Location within Poland
- Coordinates: 50°30′N 20°23′E
- Country: Poland
- Voivodeship: Świętokrzyskie
- County: Pińczów
- Gmina: Michałów
- Website: http://michalow.pl

Wrocieryż [vrɔˈt͡ɕɛrɨʂ] is a village in the administrative district of Gmina Michałów within Pińczów County, Świętokrzyskie Voivodeship, in south-central Poland. It lies approximately 6 km (4 mi) west of Michałów, 12 km (7 mi) west of Pińczów, and 46 km (29 mi) south of the regional capital of Kielce.
