= Przecławka =

Przecławka (gmina pińczów)
- Village
- Location within Poland
- Coordinates: 50°26′N 20°24′E
- Country: Poland
- Voivodeship: Świętokrzyskie
- County: Pińczów
- Gmina: Michałów

Przecławka [pʂɛt͡sˈwafka] is a village in the administrative district of Gmina Michałów, within Pińczów County, Świętokrzyskie Voivodeship, in south-central Poland. It lies approximately 8 km (5 mi) south-west of Michałów, 15 km (9 mi) south-west of Pińczów, and 53 km (33 mi) south of the regional capital Kielce.
