= Węchadłów =

- Village
- Location within Poland
- Coordinates: 50°27′8″N 20°23′4″E
- Country: Poland
- Voivodeship: Świętokrzyskie
- County: Pińczów
- Gmina: Michałów

Węchadłów [vɛ̃ˈxadwuf] is a village in the administrative district of Gmina Michałów, within Pińczów County, Świętokrzyskie Voivodeship, in south-central Poland. It lies approximately 8 km (5 mi) south-west of Michałów, 14 km (9 mi) south-west of Pińczów, and 51 km (32 mi) south of the regional capital Kielce.
