= Tur Dolny =

- Village
- Location within Poland
- Coordinates: 50°32′N 20°25′E
- Country: Poland
- Voivodeship: Świętokrzyskie
- County: Pińczów
- Gmina: Michałów

Tur Dolny [ˈtur ˈdɔlnɨ] is a village in the administrative district of Gmina Michałów, within Pińczów County, Świętokrzyskie Voivodeship, in south-central Poland. It lies approximately 6 km (4 mi) north-west of Michałów, 9 km (6 mi) west of Pińczów, and 42 km (26 mi) south of the regional capital Kielce.
