= Młodzawy Małe =

- Village
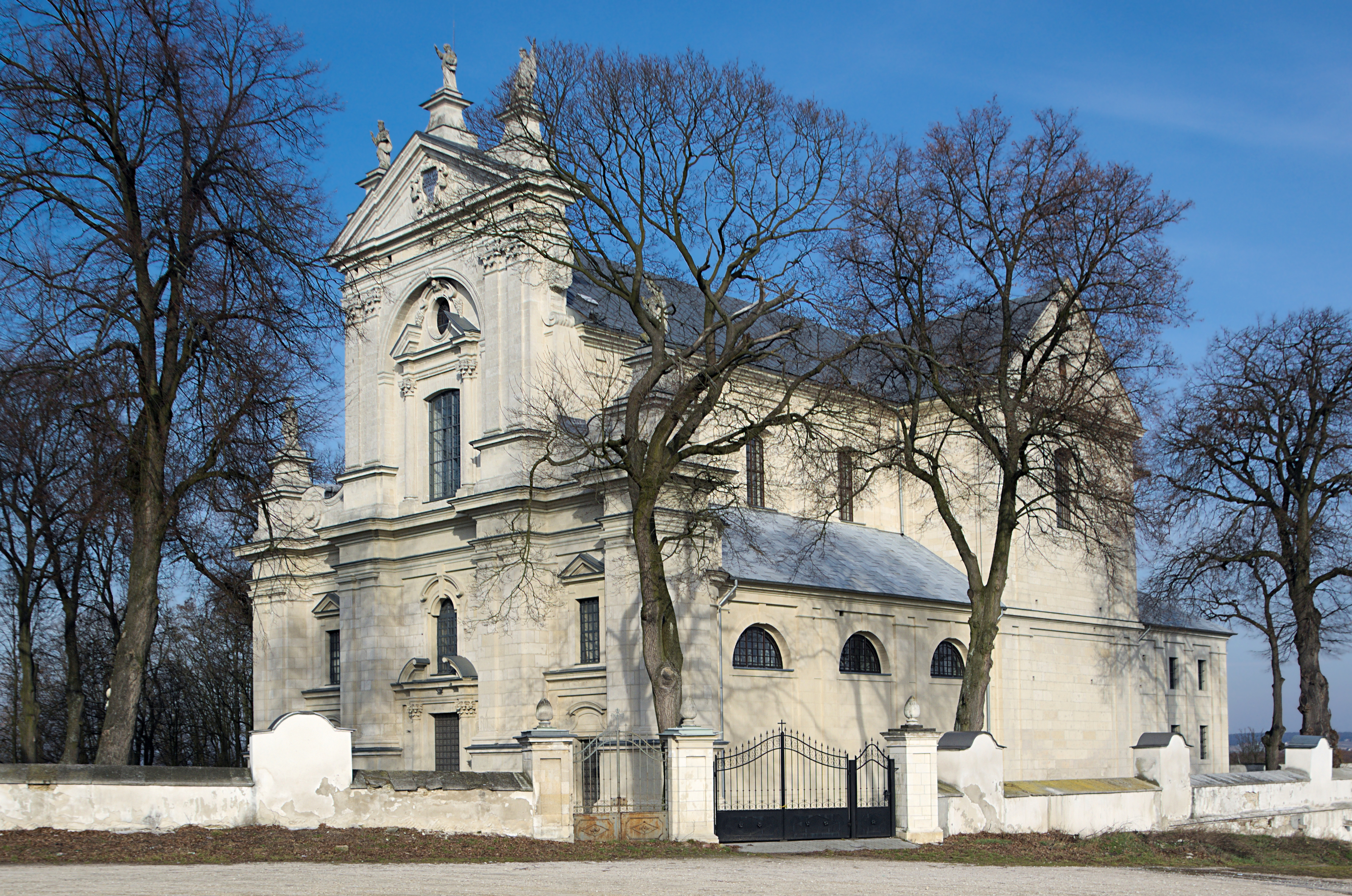
- Church

- Location within Poland
- Coordinates: 50°27′N 20°31′E
- Country: Poland
- Voivodeship: Świętokrzyskie
- County: Pińczów
- Gmina: Pińczów

Młodzawy Małe [mwɔˈd͡zavɨ ˈmawɛ] is a village in the administrative district of Gmina Pińczów, within Pińczów County, Świętokrzyskie Voivodeship, in south-central Poland. It lies approximately 9 km (6 mi) south of Pińczów and 49 km (30 mi) south of the regional capital Kielce.
