= Pasturka =

- Village
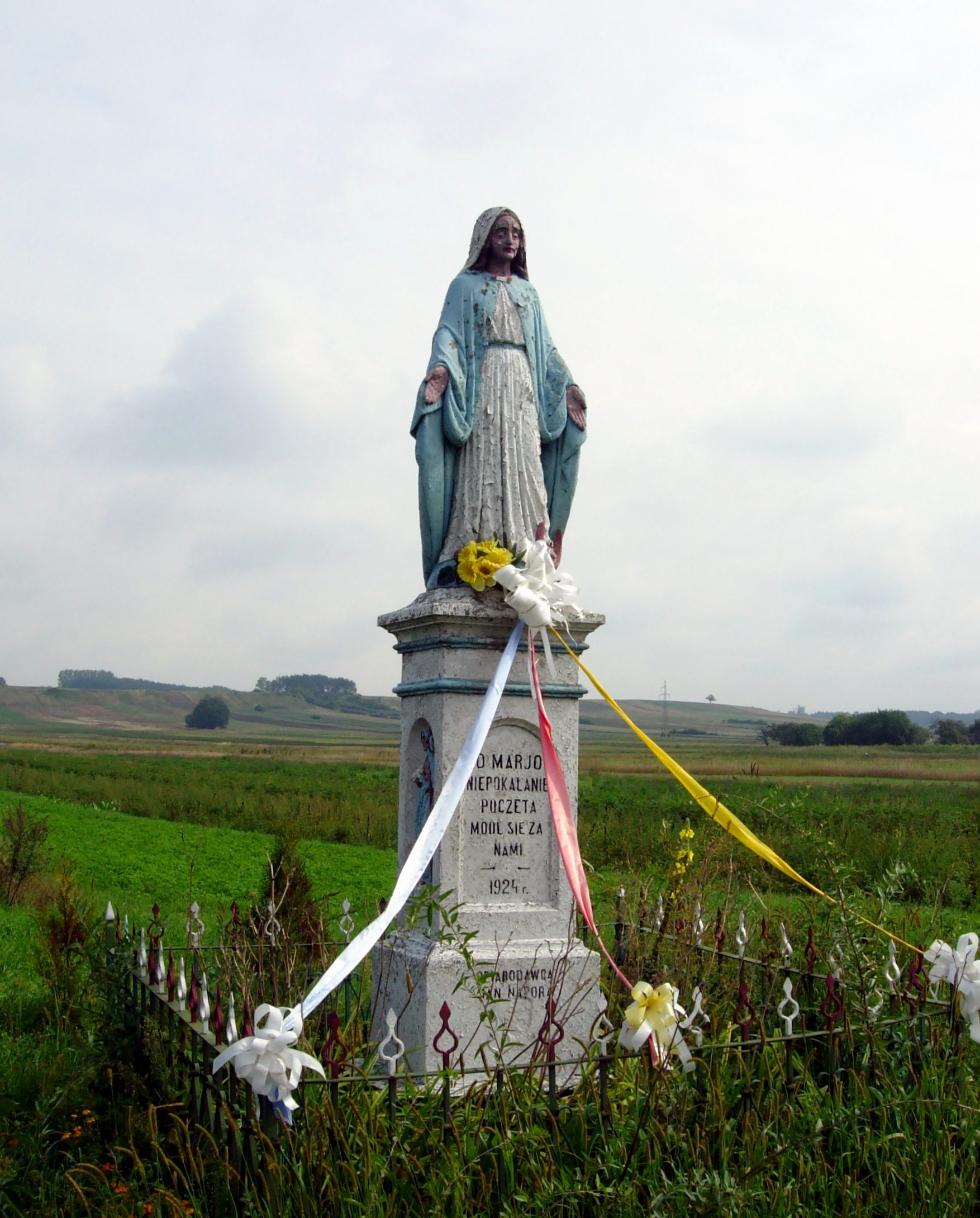

- Location within Poland
- Coordinates: 50°29′50″N 20°33′42″E
- Country: Poland
- Voivodeship: Świętokrzyskie
- County: Pińczów
- Gmina: Pińczów
- Population (approx.): 360

Pasturka [pasˈturka] is a village in the administrative district of Gmina Pińczów, within Pińczów County, Świętokrzyskie Voivodeship, in south-central Poland. It lies approximately 5 km (3 mi) south-east of Pińczów and 44 km (27 mi) south of the regional capital Kielce.
