= Wola Zagojska Górna =

- Village
- Location within Poland
- Coordinates: 50°26′41″N 20°36′34″E
- Country: Poland
- Voivodeship: Świętokrzyskie
- County: Pińczów
- Gmina: Pińczów

Wola Zagojska Górna [ˈvɔla zaˈɡɔi̯ska ˈɡurna] is a village in the administrative district of Gmina Pińczów, within Pińczów County, Świętokrzyskie Voivodeship, in south-central Poland. It lies approximately 12 km (7 mi) south-east of Pińczów and 49 km (30 mi) south of the regional capital Kielce.
