= Byczów =

- Village
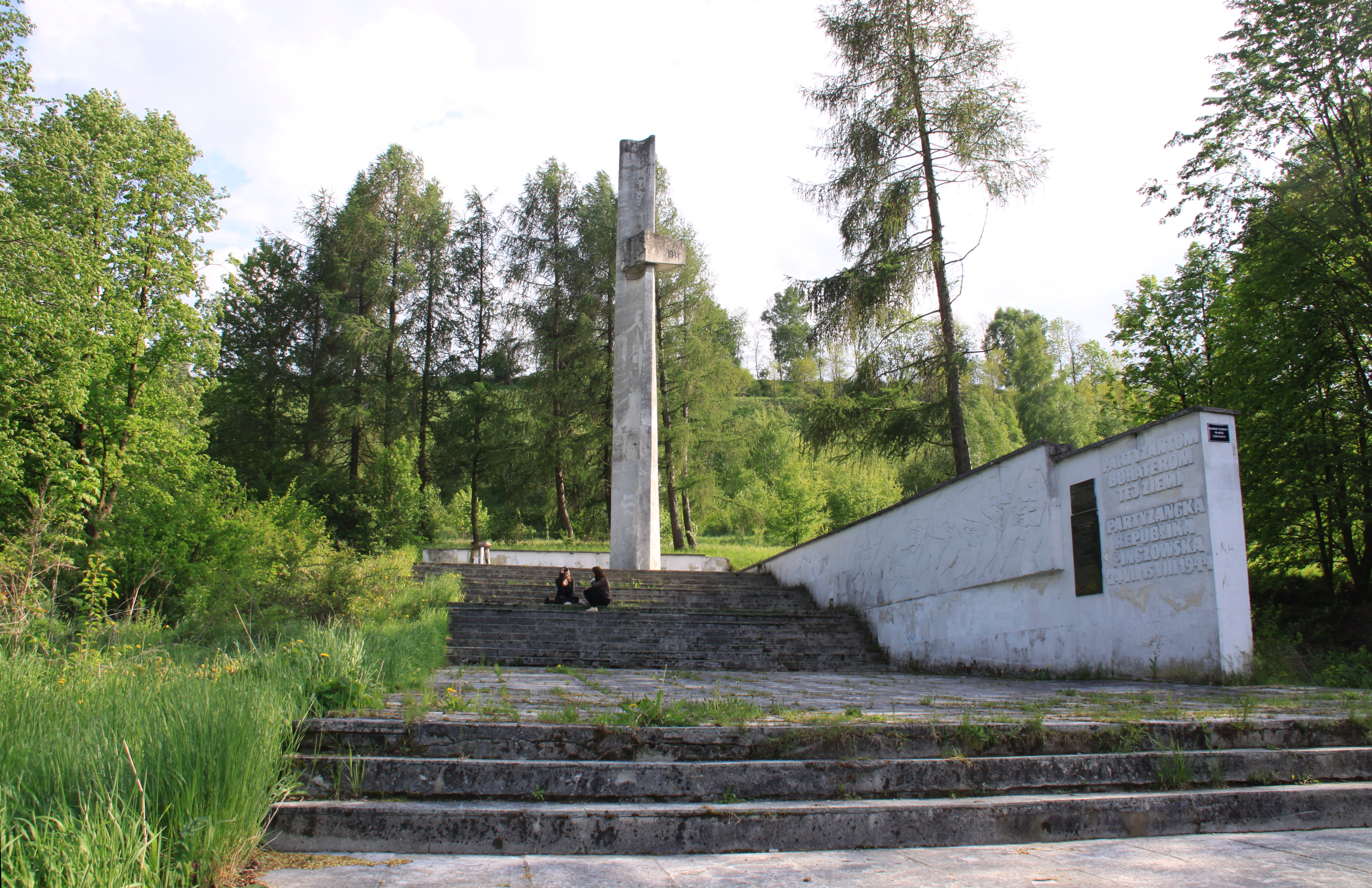

- Location within Poland
- Coordinates: 50°25′N 20°30′E
- Country: Poland
- Voivodeship: Świętokrzyskie
- County: Pińczów
- Gmina: Pińczów
- Population: 85
- Website: http://www.byczow.ir.pl

Byczów [ˈbɨt͡ʂuf] is a village in the administrative district of Gmina Pińczów, within Pińczów County, Świętokrzyskie Voivodeship, in south-central Poland. It lies approximately 14 km (9 mi) south of Pińczów and 53 km (33 mi) south of the regional capital Kielce.
