= Brzeście, Pińczów County =

Brzeście
- Village
- Location within Poland
- Coordinates: 50°32′31″N 20°32′56″E
- Country: Poland
- Voivodeship: Świętokrzyskie
- County: Pińczów
- Gmina: Pińczów

Brzeście [ˈbʐɛɕt͡ɕɛ] is a village in the administrative district of Gmina Pińczów, within Pińczów County, Świętokrzyskie Voivodeship, in south-central Poland. It lies approximately 2 km (1 mi) north-east of Pińczów and 39 km (24 mi) south of the regional capital Kielce.
