= Sadek, Świętokrzyskie Voivodeship =

Sadek
- Village
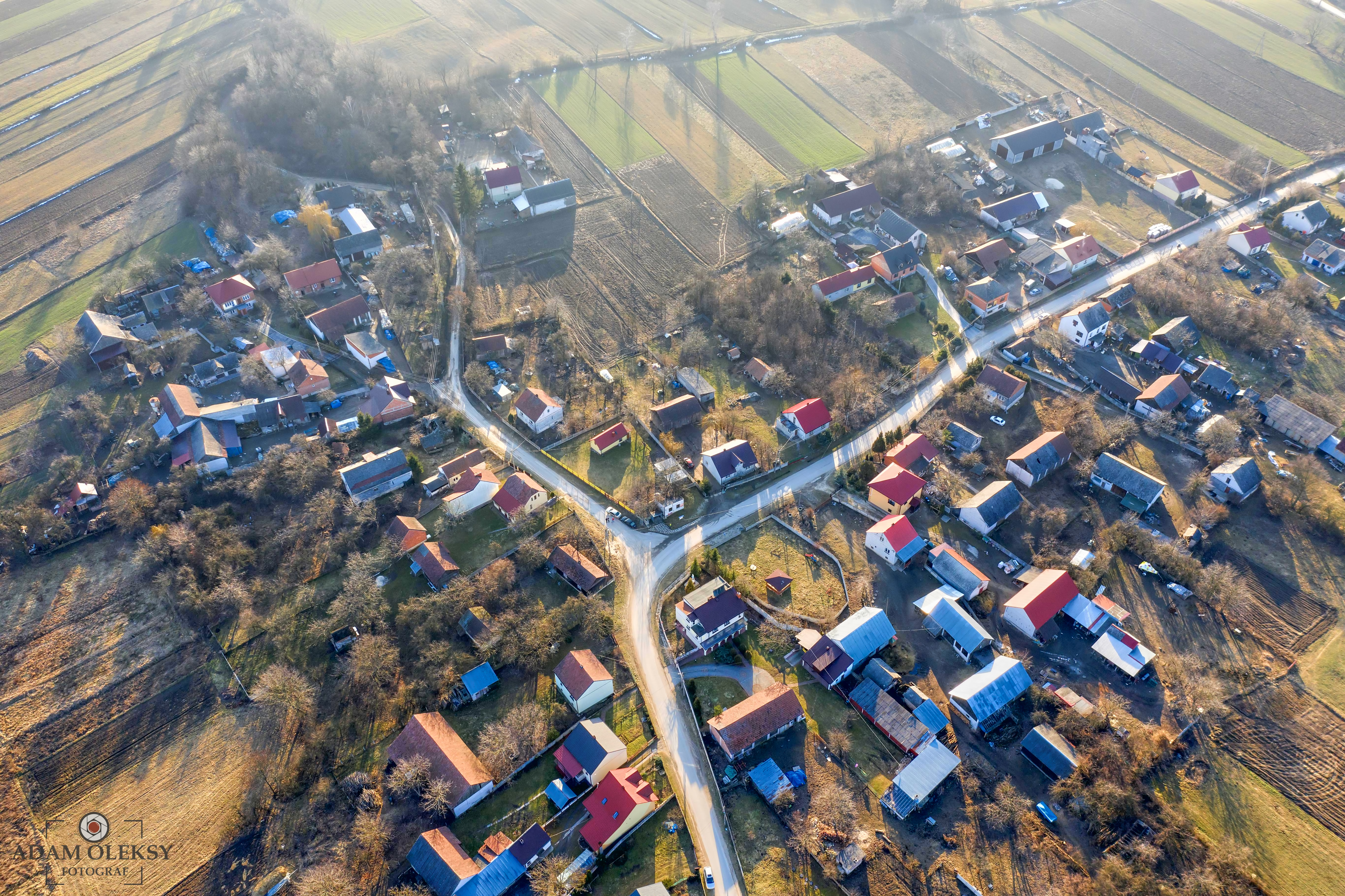

- Location within Poland
- Coordinates: 50°26′N 20°26′E
- Country: Poland
- Voivodeship: Świętokrzyskie
- County: Pińczów
- Gmina: Pińczów
- Population: 240

Sadek [ˈsadɛk] is a village in the administrative district of Gmina Pińczów, within Pińczów County, Świętokrzyskie Voivodeship, in south-central Poland. It lies approximately 14 km (9 mi) south-west of Pińczów and 52 km (32 mi) south of the regional capital Kielce.
