= Bogucice Pierwsze =

- Village
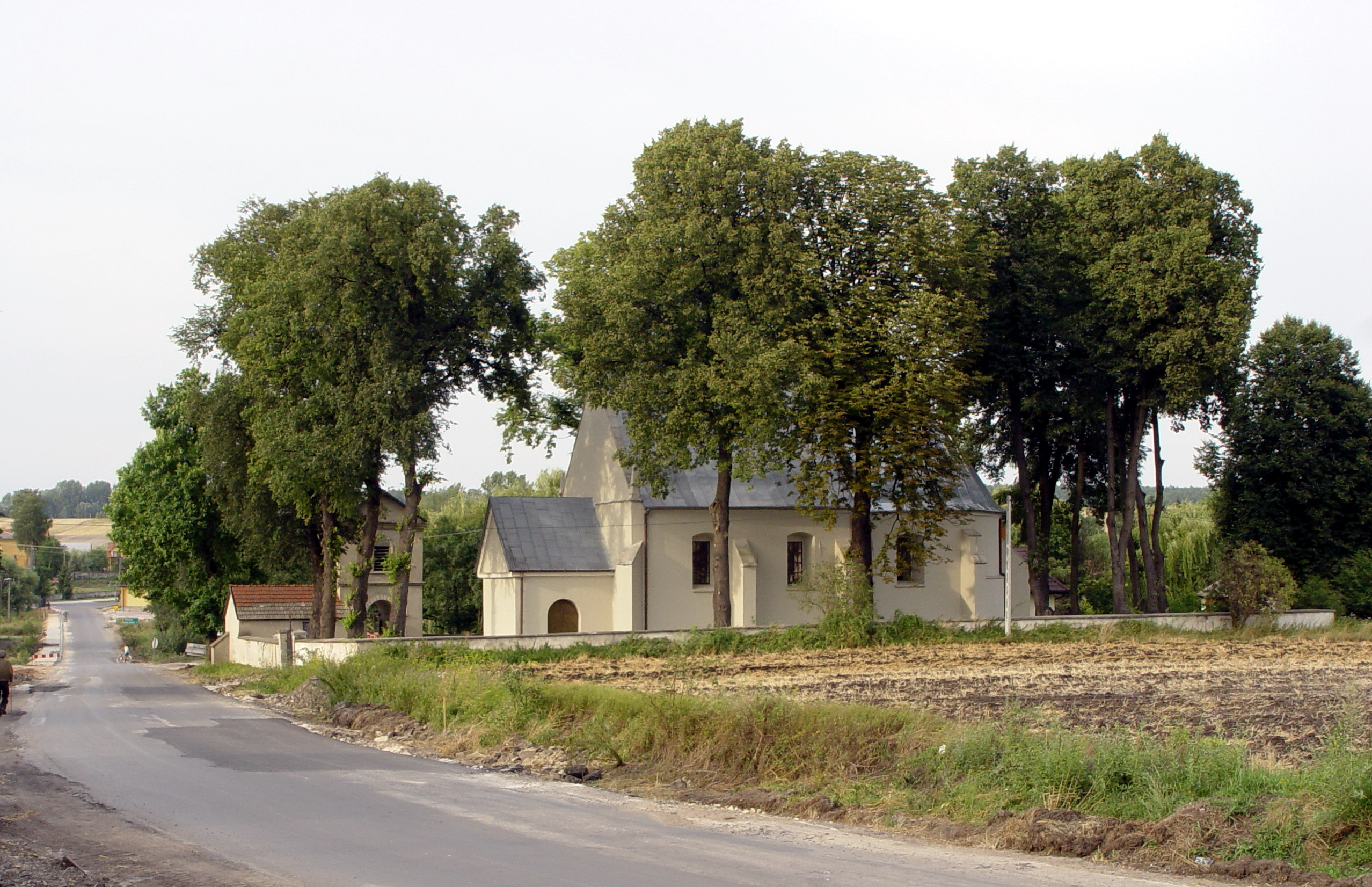

- Location within Poland
- Coordinates: 50°29′8″N 20°35′35″E
- Country: Poland
- Voivodeship: Świętokrzyskie
- County: Pińczów
- Gmina: Pińczów
- Website: http://www.bogucice.pinczow.com.pl/

Bogucice Pierwsze [bɔɡuˈt͡ɕit͡sɛ ˈpjɛrfʂɛ] is a village in the administrative district of Gmina Pińczów, within Pińczów County, Świętokrzyskie Voivodeship, in south-central Poland. It lies approximately 7 km (4 mi) south-east of Pińczów and 45 km (28 mi) south of the regional capital Kielce.
