= Orkanów =

- Village
- Location within Poland
- Coordinates: 50°25′13″N 20°24′59″E
- Country: Poland
- Voivodeship: Świętokrzyskie
- County: Pińczów
- Gmina: Pińczów
- Population: 200

Orkanów [ɔrˈkanuf] is a village in the administrative district of Gmina Pińczów, within Pińczów County, Świętokrzyskie Voivodeship, in south-central Poland. It lies approximately 16 km (10 mi) south-west of Pińczów and 54 km (34 mi) south of the regional capital Kielce.
