= Skowronno Dolne =

- Village
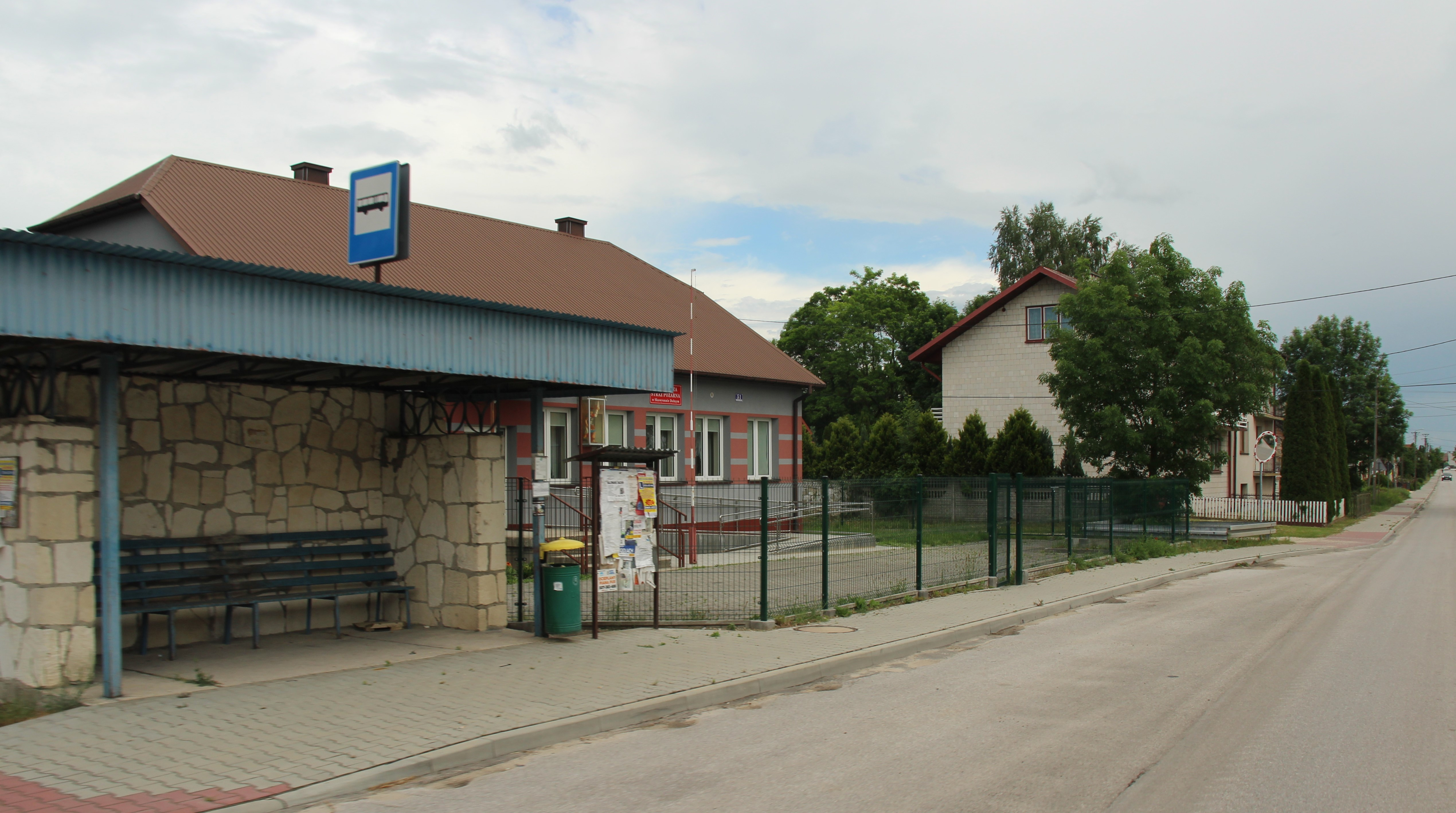

- Location within Poland
- Coordinates: 50°32′36″N 20°29′27″E
- Country: Poland
- Voivodeship: Świętokrzyskie
- County: Pińczów
- Gmina: Pińczów

Skowronno Dolne [skɔˈvrɔnnɔ ˈdɔlnɛ] is a village in the administrative district of Gmina Pińczów, within Pińczów County, Świętokrzyskie Voivodeship, in south-central Poland. It lies approximately 4 km (2 mi) west of Pińczów and 39 km (24 mi) south of the regional capital Kielce.
