= Kozubów, Świętokrzyskie Voivodeship =

Kozubów
- Village
- Location within Poland
- Coordinates: 50°26′16″N 20°29′5″E
- Country: Poland
- Voivodeship: Świętokrzyskie
- County: Pińczów
- Gmina: Pińczów

Kozubów [kɔˈzubuf] is a village in the administrative district of Gmina Pińczów, within Pińczów County, Świętokrzyskie Voivodeship, in south-central Poland. It lies approximately 12 km (7 mi) south of Pińczów and 51 km (32 mi) south of the regional capital Kielce.

The village gives its name to the protected area called Kozubów Landscape Park.
