= Uników, Świętokrzyskie Voivodeship =

Uników
- Village
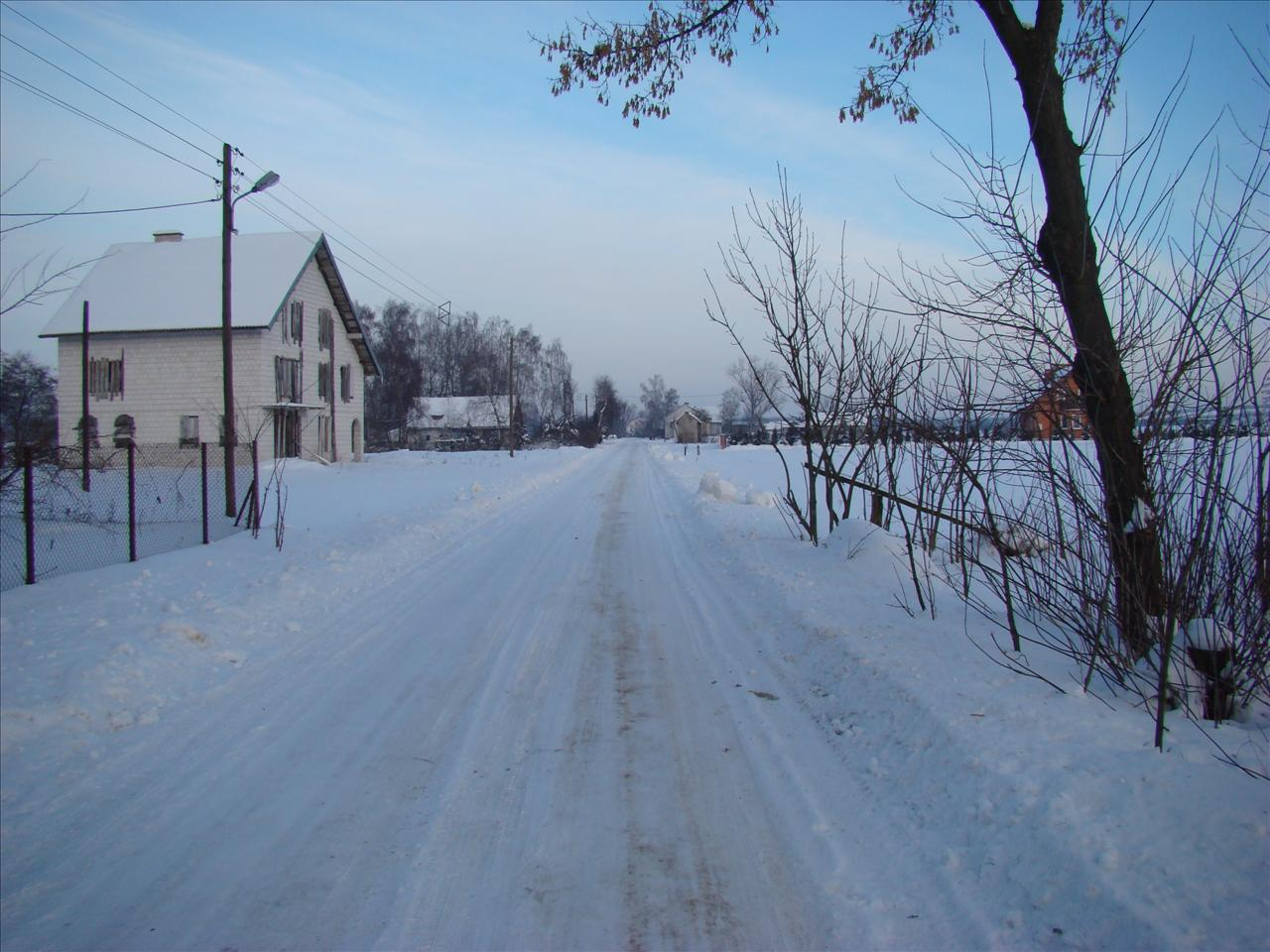

- Location within Poland
- Coordinates: 50°32′1″N 20°38′19″E
- Country: Poland
- Voivodeship: Świętokrzyskie
- County: Pińczów
- Gmina: Pińczów

Uników [uˈnikuf] is a village in the administrative district of Gmina Pińczów, within Pińczów County, Świętokrzyskie Voivodeship, in south-central Poland. It lies approximately 8 km (5 mi) east of Pińczów and 39 km (24 mi) south of the regional capital Kielce.
