= Mozgawa =

- Village
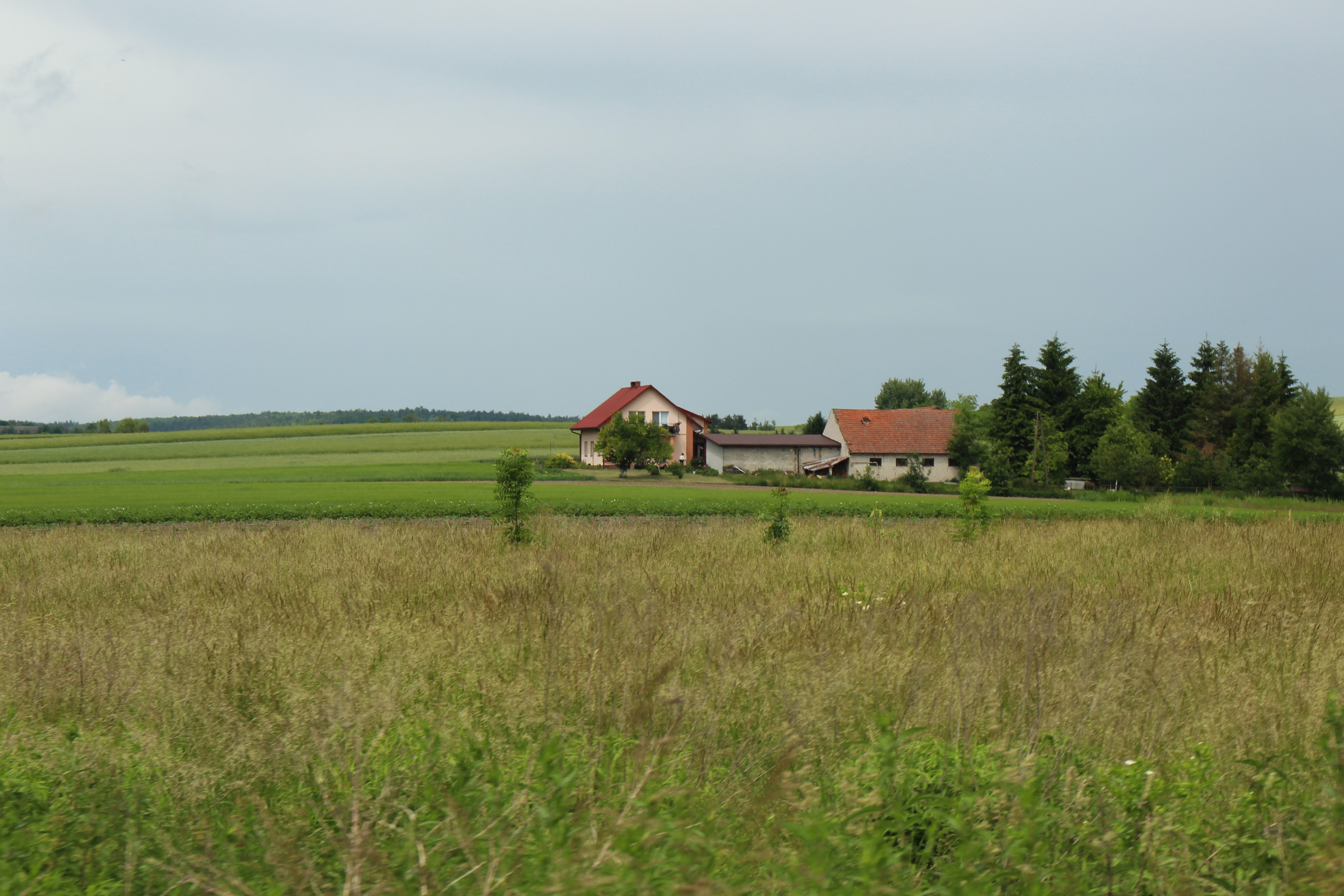

- Location within Poland
- Coordinates: 50°26′N 20°31′E
- Country: Poland
- Voivodeship: Świętokrzyskie
- County: Pińczów
- Gmina: Pińczów
- Population: 250

Mozgawa [mɔzˈɡava] is a village in the administrative district of Gmina Pińczów, within Pińczów County, Świętokrzyskie Voivodeship, in south-central Poland. It lies approximately 12 km (7 mi) south of Pińczów and 51 km (32 mi) south of the regional capital Kielce.
