= Bugaj, Pińczów County =

Bugaj
- Village
- Location within Poland
- Coordinates: 50°26′45″N 20°28′12″E
- Country: Poland
- Voivodeship: Świętokrzyskie
- County: Pińczów
- Gmina: Pińczów

Bugaj [ˈbuɡai̯] is a village in the administrative district of Gmina Pińczów, within Pińczów County, Świętokrzyskie Voivodeship, in south-central Poland. It lies approximately 11 km (7 mi) south-west of Pińczów and 50 km (31 mi) south of the regional capital Kielce.
