= Szczypiec =

- Village
- Location within Poland
- Coordinates: 50°33′N 20°35′E
- Country: Poland
- Voivodeship: Świętokrzyskie
- County: Pińczów
- Gmina: Pińczów

Szczypiec [ˈʂt͡ʂɨpjɛt͡s] is a village in the administrative district of Gmina Pińczów, within Pińczów County, Świętokrzyskie Voivodeship, in south-central Poland. It lies approximately 4 km (2 mi) north-east of Pińczów and 38 km (24 mi) south of the regional capital Kielce.
