= Winiary, Pińczów County =

Winiary
- Village
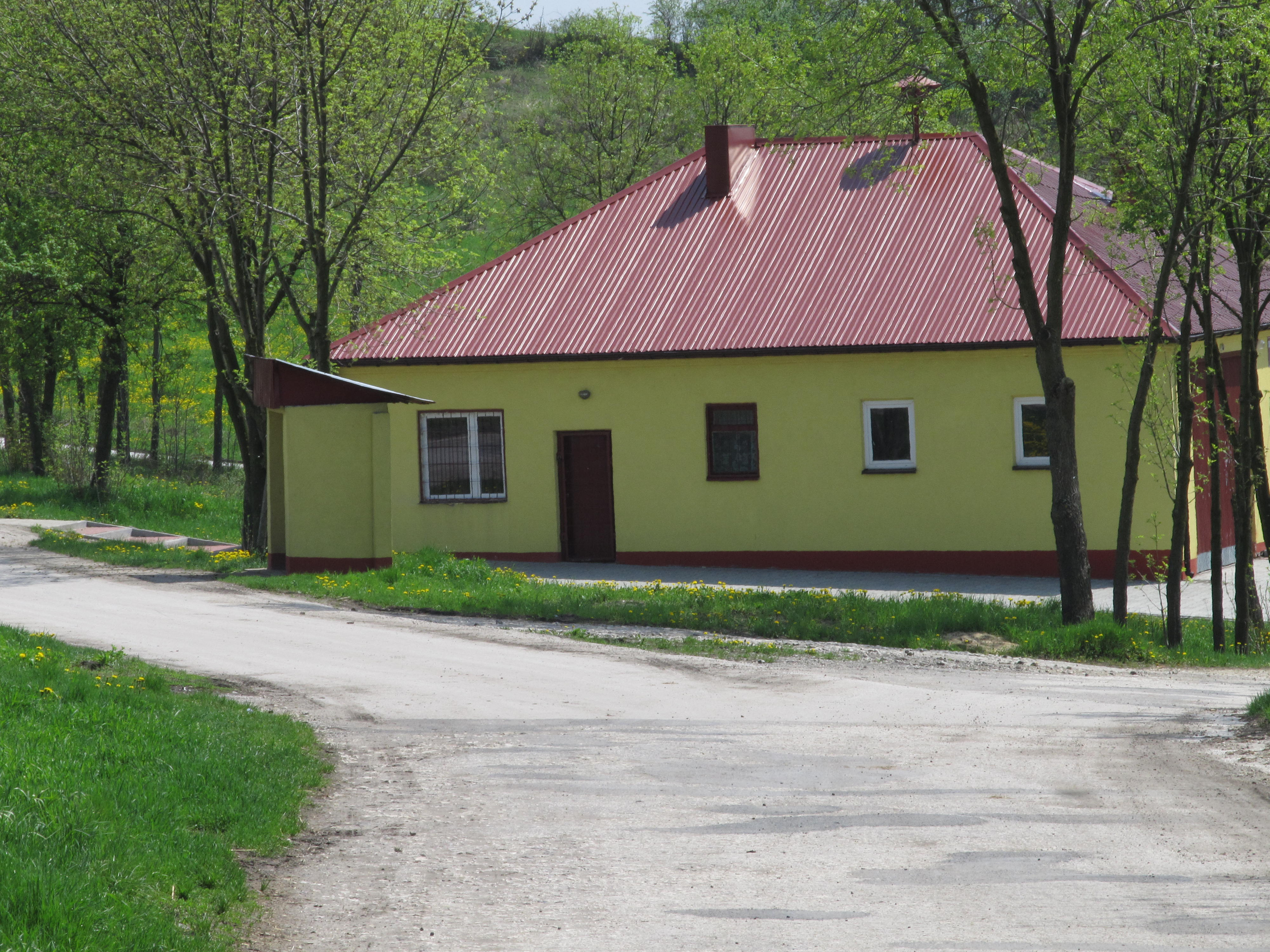

- Location within Poland
- Coordinates: 50°26′32″N 20°37′26″E
- Country: Poland
- Voivodeship: Świętokrzyskie
- County: Pińczów
- Gmina: Pińczów

Winiary [viˈɲarɨ] is a village in the administrative district of Gmina Pińczów, within Pińczów County, Świętokrzyskie Voivodeship, in south-central Poland. It lies approximately 12 km (7 mi) south-east of Pińczów and 49 km (30 mi) south of the regional capital Kielce.
