= Aleksandrów, Pińczów County =

Aleksandrów
- Village
- Location within Poland
- Coordinates: 50°34′34″N 20°9′21″E
- Country: Poland
- Voivodeship: Świętokrzyskie
- County: Pińczów
- Gmina: Pińczów

Aleksandrów [alɛkˈsandruf] is a village in the administrative district of Gmina Pińczów, within Pińczów County, Świętokrzyskie Voivodeship, in south-central Poland. It lies approximately 28 km (17 mi) west of Pińczów and 48 km (30 mi) south-west of the regional capital Kielce.
