= Młodzawy Duże =

- Village
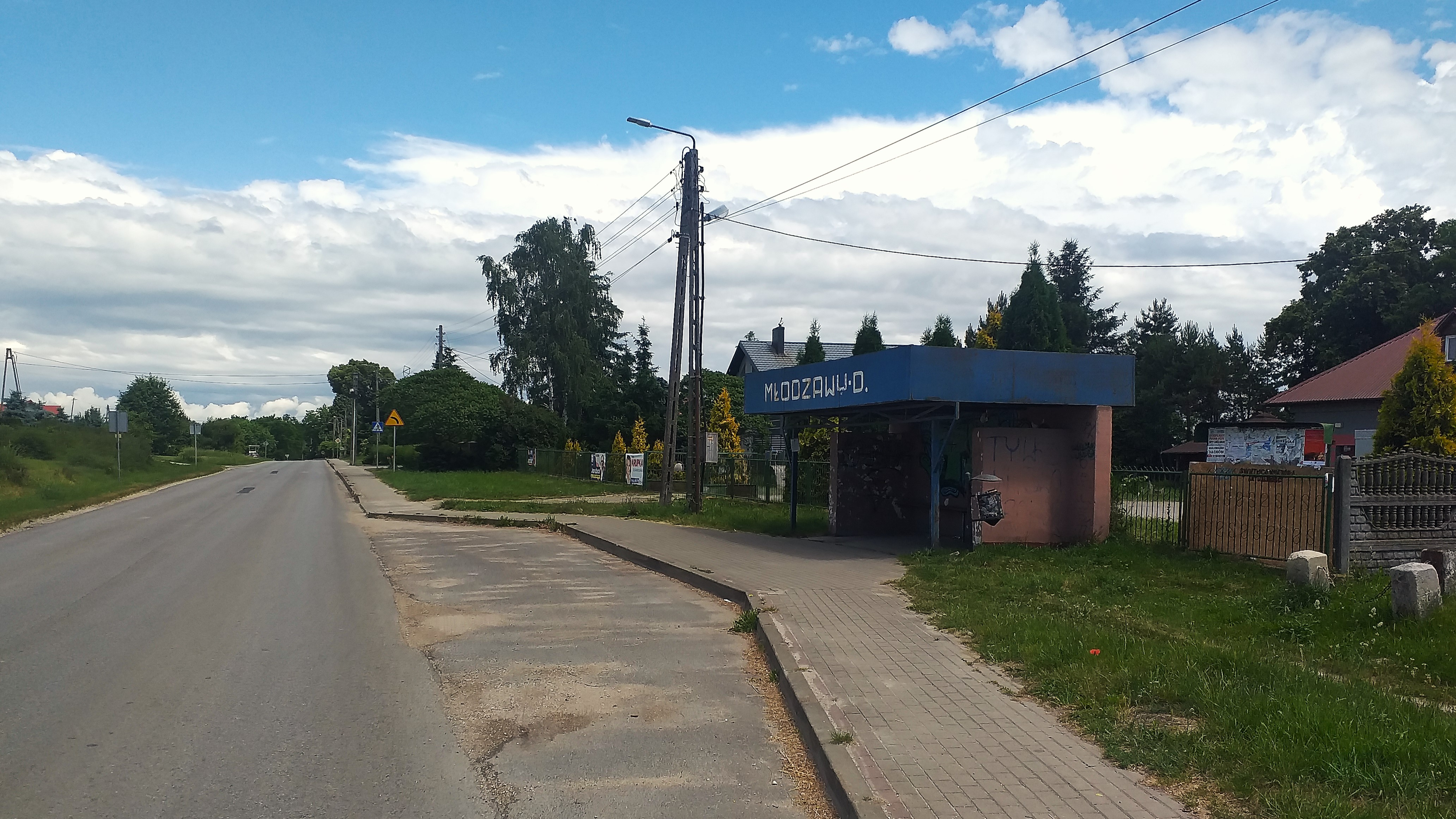

- Location within Poland
- Coordinates: 50°28′N 20°31′E
- Country: Poland
- Voivodeship: Świętokrzyskie
- County: Pińczów
- Gmina: Pińczów

Młodzawy Duże [mwɔˈd͡zavɨ ˈduʐɛ] is a village in the administrative district of Gmina Pińczów, within Pińczów County, Świętokrzyskie Voivodeship, in south-central Poland. It lies approximately 8 km (5 mi) south of Pińczów and 47 km (29 mi) south of the regional capital Kielce.
