= Zawarża =

- Village
- Location within Poland
- Coordinates: 50°24′N 20°30′E
- Country: Poland
- Voivodeship: Świętokrzyskie
- County: Pińczów
- Gmina: Pińczów

Zawarża [zaˈvarʐa] is a village in the administrative district of Gmina Pińczów, within Pińczów County, Świętokrzyskie Voivodeship, in south-central Poland. It lies approximately 15 km (9 mi) south of Pińczów and 55 km (34 mi) south of the regional capital Kielce.
