= Krzyżanowice Dolne =

- Village
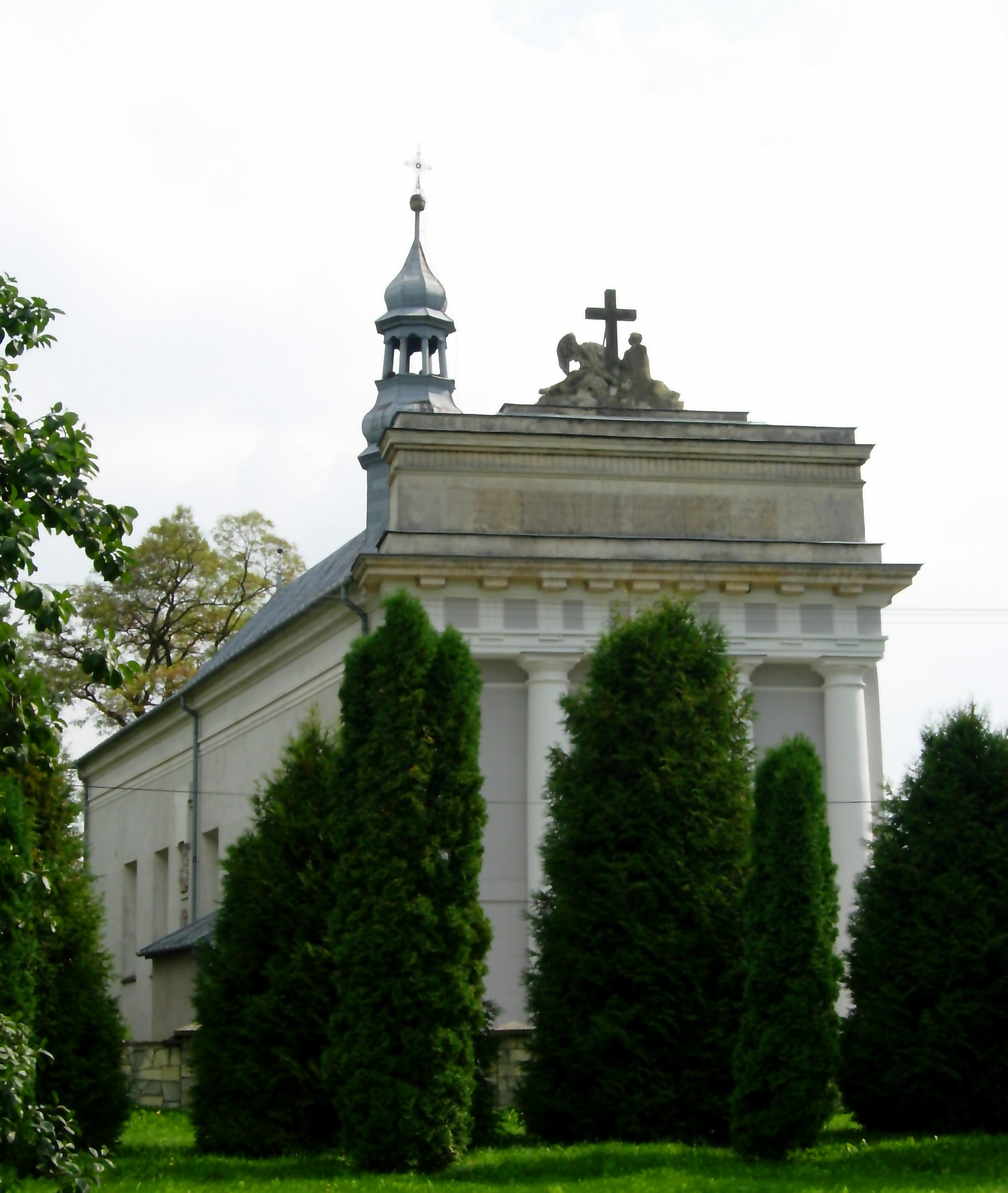

- Location within Poland
- Coordinates: 50°27′43″N 20°32′35″E
- Country: Poland
- Voivodeship: Świętokrzyskie
- County: Pińczów
- Gmina: Pińczów

Krzyżanowice Dolne [kʂɨʐanɔˈvit͡sɛ ˈdɔlnɛ] is a village in the administrative district of Gmina Pińczów, within Pińczów County, Świętokrzyskie Voivodeship, in south-central Poland. It lies approximately 8 kilometres (5 mi) south of Pińczów and 48 km (30 mi) south of the regional capital Kielce.
