= Chwałowice =

Chwałowice may refer to the following places in Poland:

- Chwałowice, Lower Silesian Voivodeship (south-west Poland)
- Chwałowice, Świętokrzyskie Voivodeship (south-central Poland)
- Chwałowice, Subcarpathian Voivodeship (south-east Poland)
- Chwałowice, Masovian Voivodeship (east-central Poland)
- Chwałowice, Lubusz Voivodeship (west Poland)
- Chwałowice, Rybnik in Silesian Voivodeship (south Poland)
