= Bogucice Drugie =

- Village
- Location within Poland
- Coordinates: 50°29′45″N 20°36′10″E
- Country: Poland
- Voivodeship: Świętokrzyskie
- County: Pińczów
- Gmina: Pińczów

Bogucice Drugie [bɔɡuˈt͡ɕit͡sɛ ˈdruɡʲɛ] is a village in the administrative district of Gmina Pińczów, within Pińczów County, Świętokrzyskie Voivodeship, in south-central Poland. It lies approximately 7 km (4 mi) south-east of Pińczów and 44 km (27 mi) south of the regional capital Kielce.
