= Krzyżanowice Średnie =

- Village
- Location within Poland
- Coordinates: 50°27′34″N 20°33′32″E
- Country: Poland
- Voivodeship: Świętokrzyskie
- County: Pińczów
- Gmina: Pińczów

Krzyżanowice Średnie [kʂɨʐanɔˈvit͡sɛ ˈɕrɛdɲɛ] is a village in the administrative district of Gmina Pińczów, within Pińczów County, Świętokrzyskie Voivodeship, in south-central Poland.
