= Chrabków =

- Village
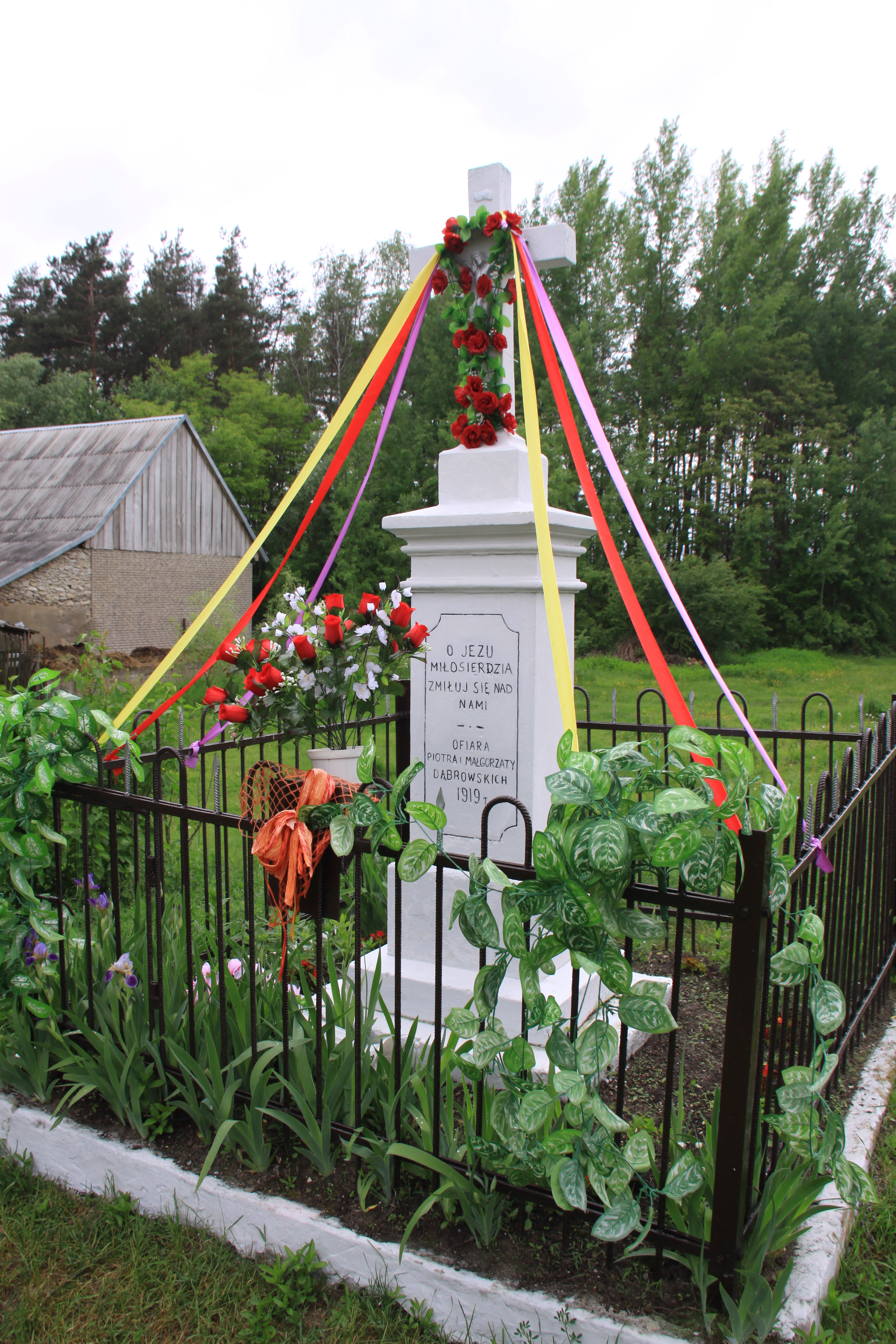
- Roadside Cross Foundation Peter and Margaret Dąbrowski of 1919 in Chrabków

- Location within Poland
- Coordinates: 52°2′N 19°22′E
- Country: Poland
- Voivodeship: Świętokrzyskie
- County: Pińczów
- Gmina: Pińczów
- Population (approx.): 140

Chrabków [ˈxrapkuf] is a village in the administrative district of Gmina Pińczów, within Pińczów County, Świętokrzyskie Voivodeship, in south-central Poland.
