= Gacki, Pińczów County =

Gacki
- Village
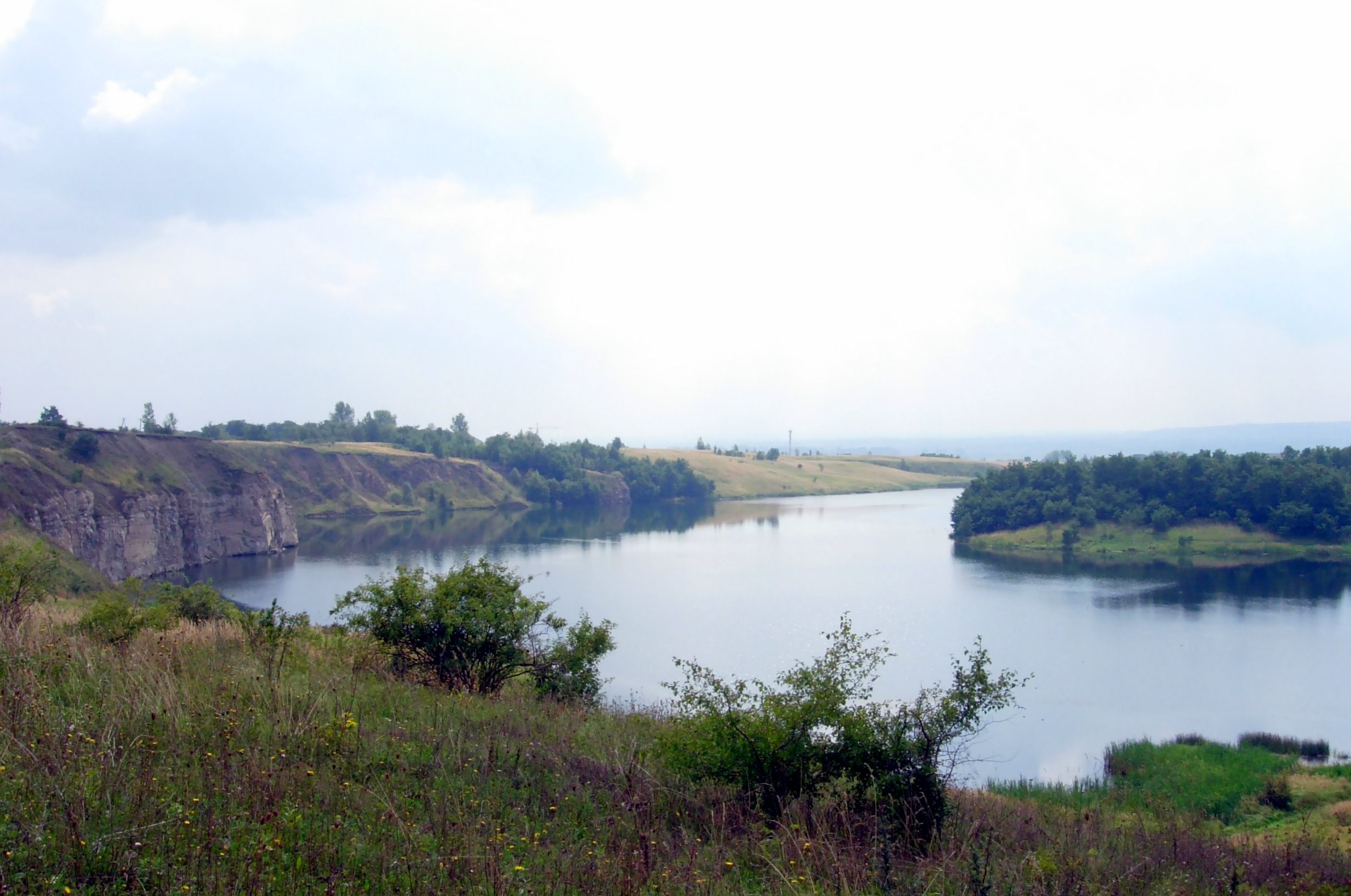

- Location within Poland
- Coordinates: 50°28′N 20°34′E
- Country: Poland
- Voivodeship: Świętokrzyskie
- County: Pińczów
- Gmina: Pińczów
- Population (approx.): 80

Gacki (Polish pronunciation: [ˈɡat͡skʲi]) is a village in the administrative district of Gmina Pińczów, within Pińczów County, Świętokrzyskie Voivodeship, in south-central Poland. It lies approximately 8 km (5 mi) south of Pińczów and 47 km (29 mi) south of the regional capital Kielce.
