= Kozubów Landscape Park =

Park in Poland

Coordinates: 50°27′N 20°29′E

- Kozubowski Park Krajobrazowy
- IUCN category V (protected landscape/seascape)
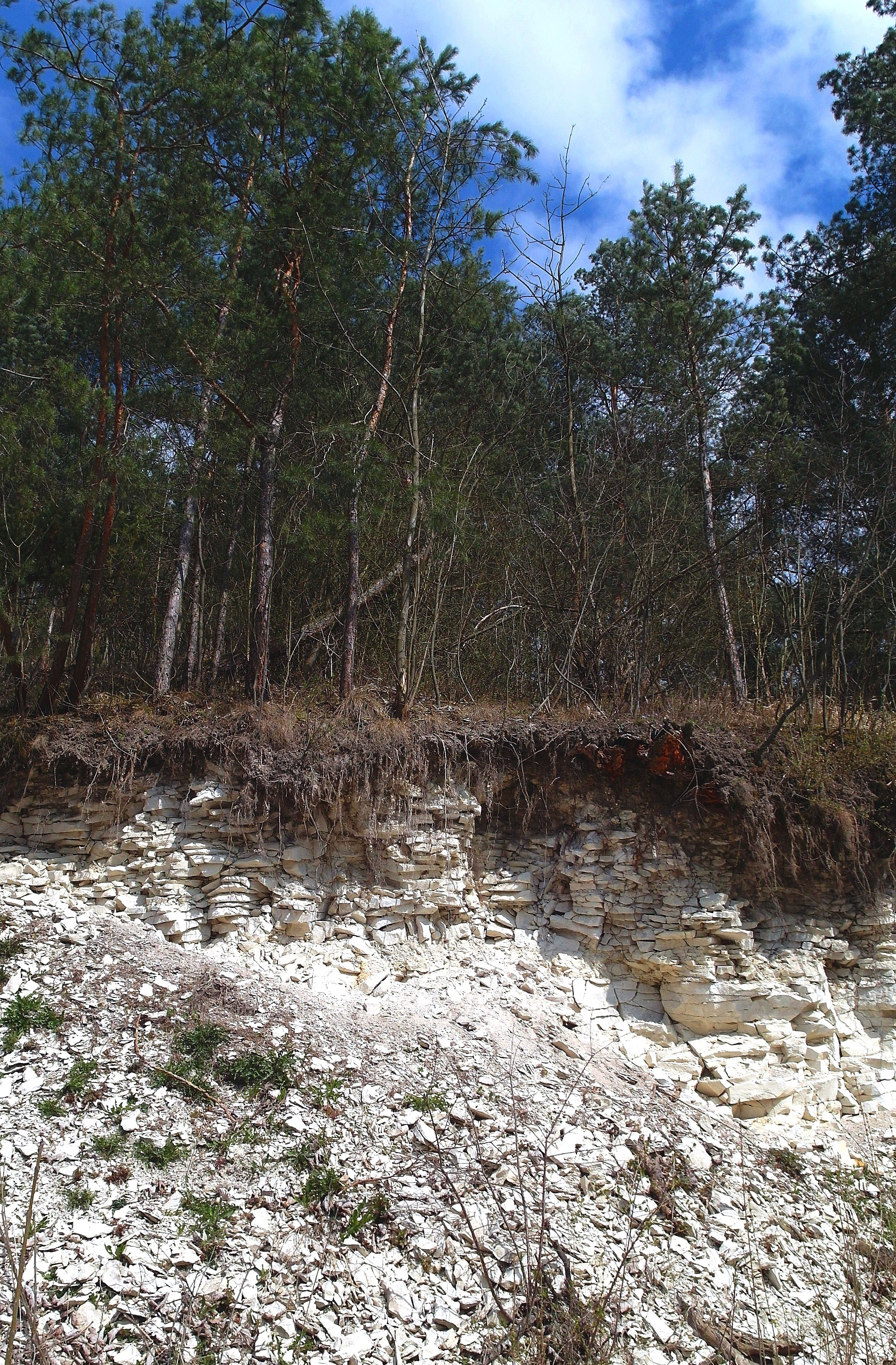
- Rendzina soil on the Maastrichtian Chalk in Kozubów Landscape Park
- Interactive map of Kozubów Landscape Park
- Location: Świętokrzyskie Voivodeship
- Area: 66.13 km^{2} (25.53 sq mi)

Kozubów Landscape Park (Kozubowski Park Krajobrazowy) is a protected area (Landscape Park) in south-central Poland, covering an area of 66.13 square kilometres (25.53 sq mi).

The Park lies within Świętokrzyskie Voivodeship: in Kazimierza County (Gmina Czarnocin) and Pińczów County (Gmina Pińczów, Gmina Działoszyce, Gmina Michałów, Gmina Złota). It takes its name from the village of Kozubów in Gmina Pińczów.

Within the Landscape Park are two nature reserves.

A prominent feature of the park is the rocky landscape covered with loess.
