= Skrzypiów =

- Village
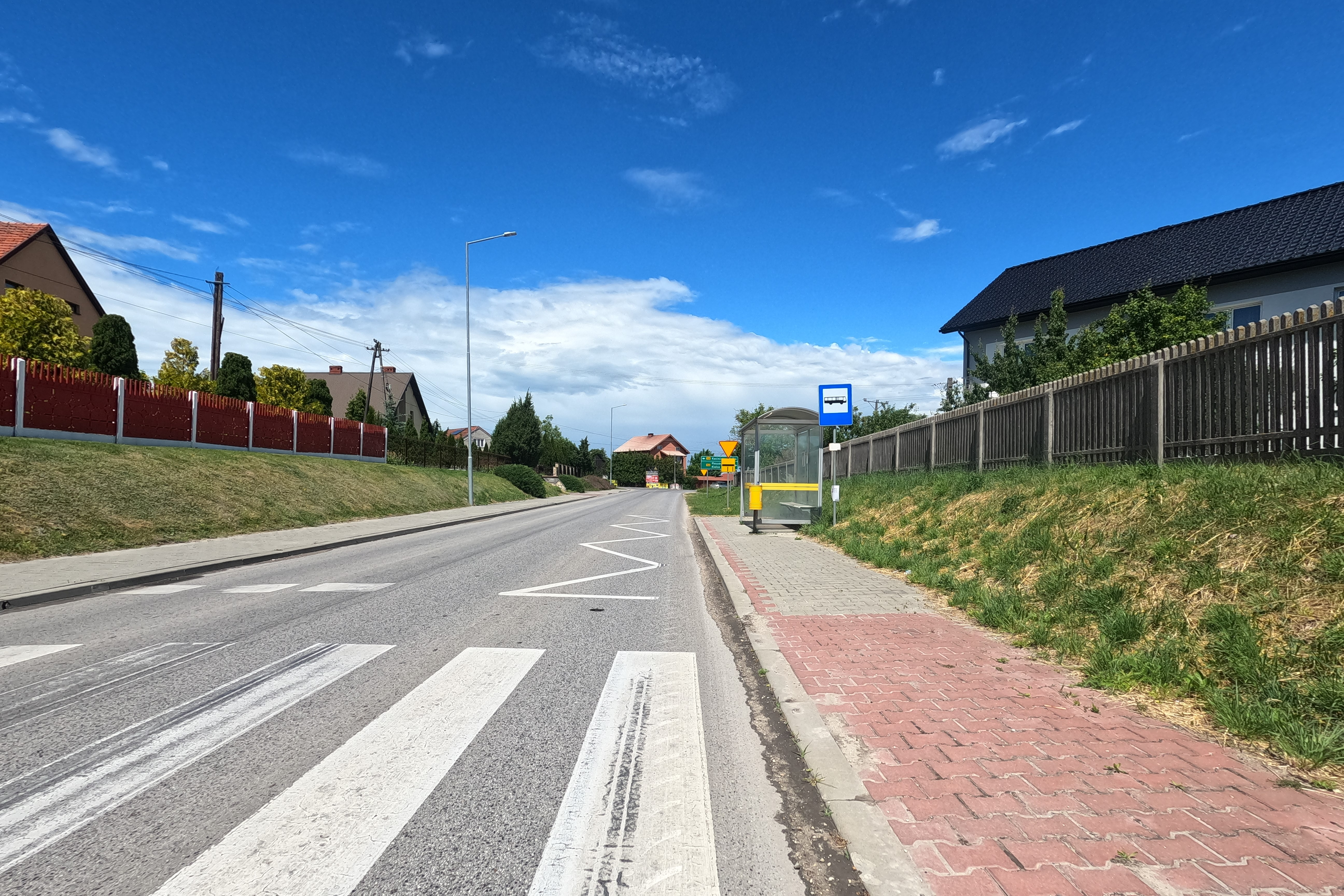

- Location within Poland
- Coordinates: 50°30′31″N 20°30′21″E
- Country: Poland
- Voivodeship: Świętokrzyskie
- County: Pińczów
- Gmina: Pińczów

Skrzypiów [ˈskʂɨpjuf] is a village in the administrative district of Gmina Pińczów, within Pińczów County, Świętokrzyskie Voivodeship, in south-central Poland. It lies approximately 4 km (2 mi) south-west of Pińczów and 43 km (27 mi) south of the regional capital Kielce.
