= Kowala, Pińczów County =

Kowala
- Village
- Location within Poland
- Coordinates: 50°28′44″N 20°33′4″E
- Country: Poland
- Voivodeship: Świętokrzyskie
- County: Pińczów
- Gmina: Pińczów

Kowala [kɔˈvala] is a village in the administrative district of Gmina Pińczów, within Pińczów County, Świętokrzyskie Voivodeship, in south-central Poland. It lies approximately 7 km (4 mi) south of Pińczów and 46 km (29 mi) south of the regional capital Kielce.
