= Nowa Zagość =

- Village
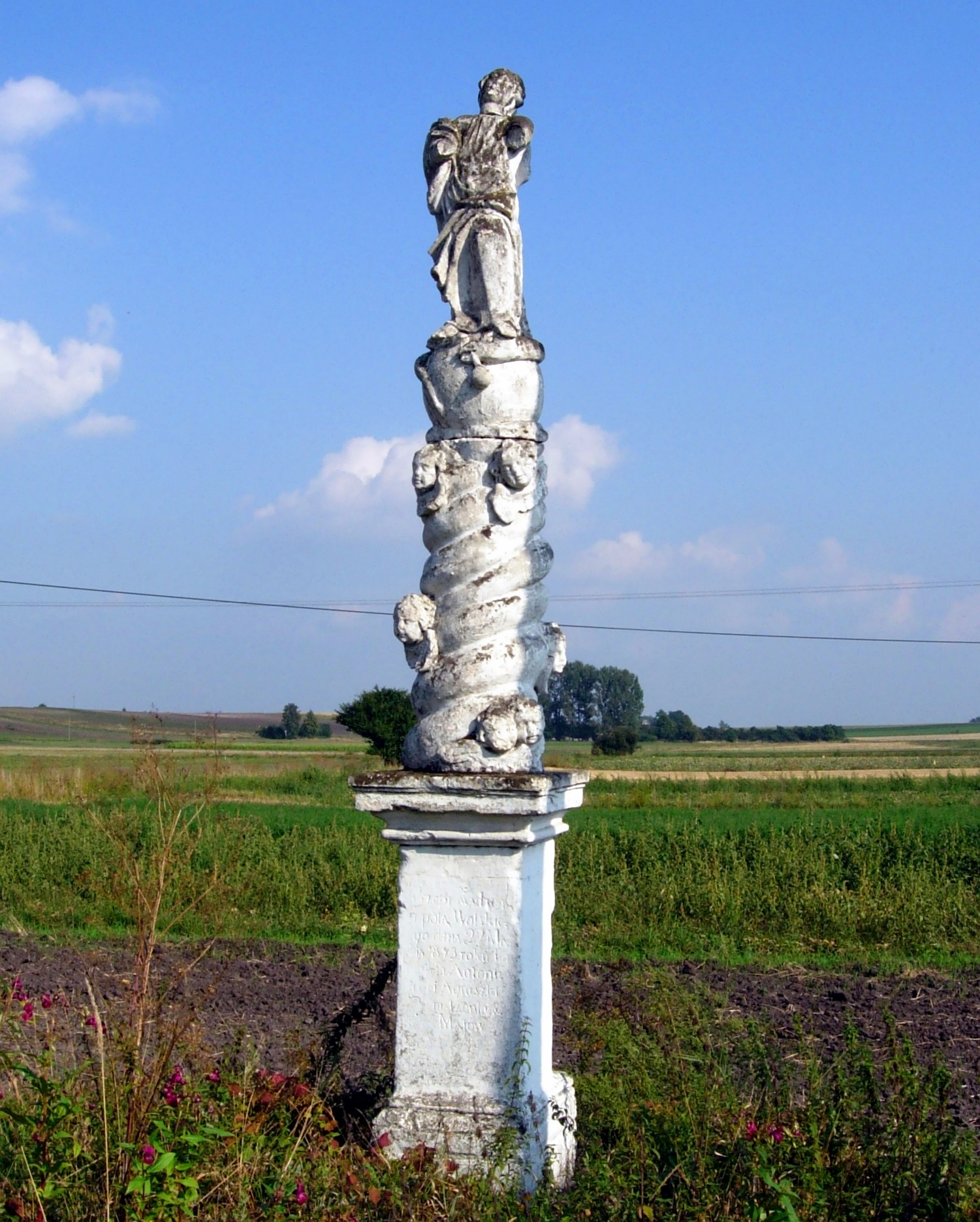

- Location within Poland
- Coordinates: 50°25′23″N 20°36′9″E
- Country: Poland
- Voivodeship: Świętokrzyskie
- County: Pińczów
- Gmina: Pińczów

Nowa Zagość [ˈnɔva ˈzaɡɔɕt͡ɕ] is a village in the administrative district of Gmina Pińczów, within Pińczów County, Świętokrzyskie Voivodeship, in south-central Poland. It lies approximately 14 km (9 mi) south of Pińczów and 52 km (32 mi) south of the regional capital Kielce.
