= Chruścice =

- Village
- Location within Poland
- Coordinates: 50°33′N 20°36′E
- Country: Poland
- Voivodeship: Świętokrzyskie
- County: Pińczów
- Gmina: Pińczów

Chruścice [xruɕˈt͡ɕit͡sɛ] is a village in the administrative district of Gmina Pińczów, within Pińczów County, Świętokrzyskie Voivodeship, in south-central Poland. It lies approximately 6 km (4 mi) east of Pińczów and 38 km (24 mi) south of the regional capital Kielce.
