= Leszcze, Świętokrzyskie Voivodeship =

Leszcze
- Village
- Location within Poland
- Coordinates: 50°26′50″N 20°34′30″E
- Country: Poland
- Voivodeship: Świętokrzyskie
- County: Pińczów
- Gmina: Pińczów

Leszcze [ˈlɛʂt͡ʂɛ] is a village in the administrative district of Gmina Pińczów, within Pińczów County, Świętokrzyskie Voivodeship, in south-central Poland. It lies approximately 10 km (6 mi) south of Pińczów and 49 km (30 mi) south of the regional capital Kielce.
