= Marzęcin, Świętokrzyskie Voivodeship =

Marzęcin
- Village
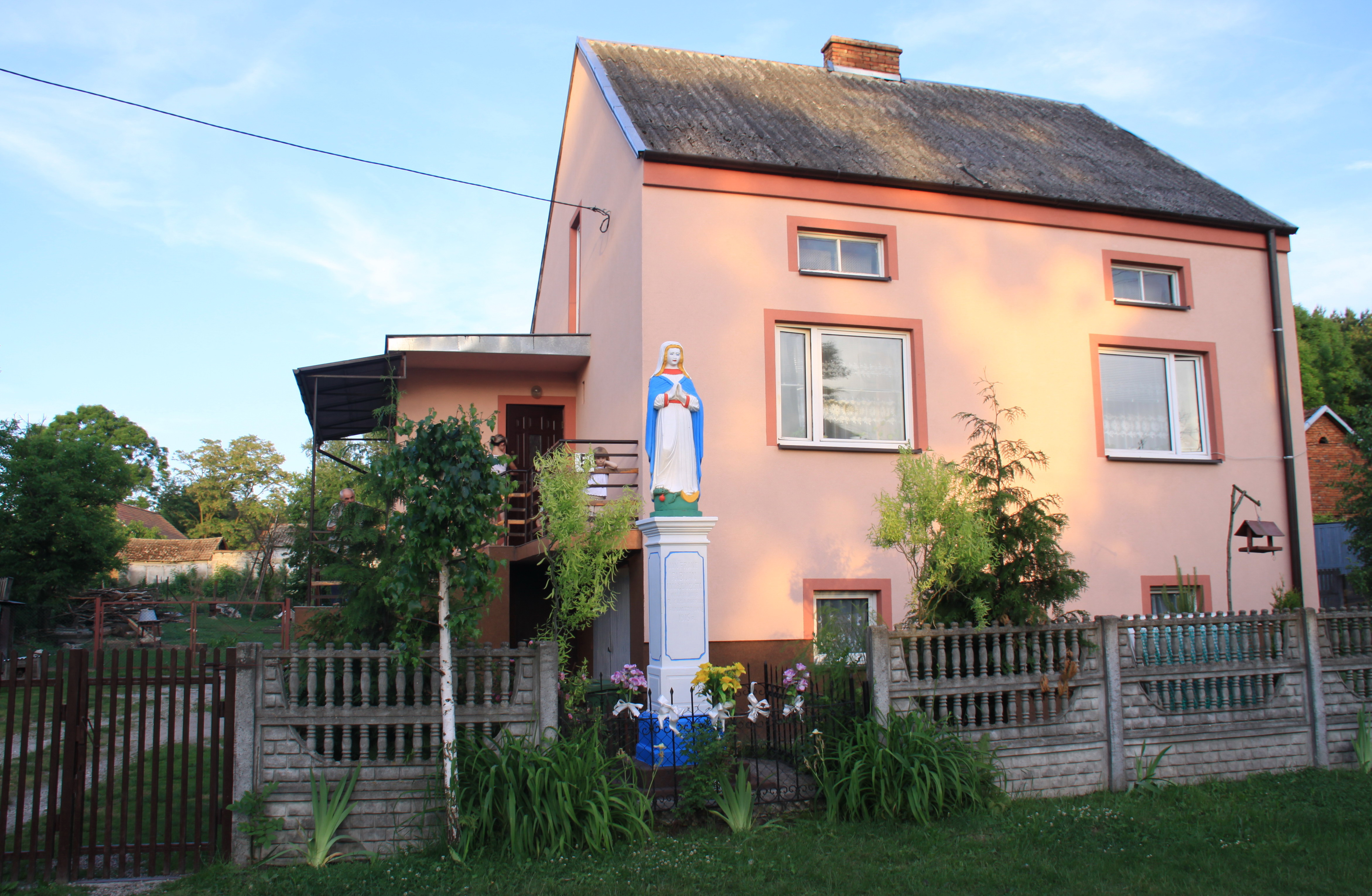

- Location within Poland
- Coordinates: 50°28′23″N 20°36′32″E
- Country: Poland
- Voivodeship: Świętokrzyskie
- County: Pińczów
- Gmina: Pińczów

Marzęcin [maˈʐɛnt͡ɕin] is a village in the administrative district of Gmina Pińczów, within Pińczów County, Świętokrzyskie Voivodeship, in south-central Poland. It lies approximately 9 km (6 mi) south-east of Pińczów and 46 km (29 mi) south of the regional capital Kielce.
