= Zakrzów, Pińczów County =

Zakrzów
- Village
- Location within Poland
- Coordinates: 50°28′57″N 20°31′49″E
- Country: Poland
- Voivodeship: Świętokrzyskie
- County: Pińczów
- Gmina: Pińczów

Zakrzów [ˈzakʂuf] is a village in the administrative district of Gmina Pińczów, within Pińczów County, Świętokrzyskie Voivodeship, in south-central Poland. It lies approximately 6 km (4 mi) south of Pińczów and 45 km (28 mi) south of the regional capital Kielce.
