= Zagórzyce, Pińczów County =

Zagórzyce
- Village
- Location within Poland
- Coordinates: 50°25′N 20°29′E
- Country: Poland
- Voivodeship: Świętokrzyskie
- County: Pińczów
- Gmina: Pińczów
- Population: 250

Zagórzyce [zaɡuˈʐɨt͡sɛ] is a village in the administrative district of Gmina Pińczów, within Pińczów County, Świętokrzyskie Voivodeship, in south-central Poland. It lies approximately 14 km (9 mi) south of Pińczów and 53 km (33 mi) south of the regional capital Kielce.
