= Stara Zagość =

- Village
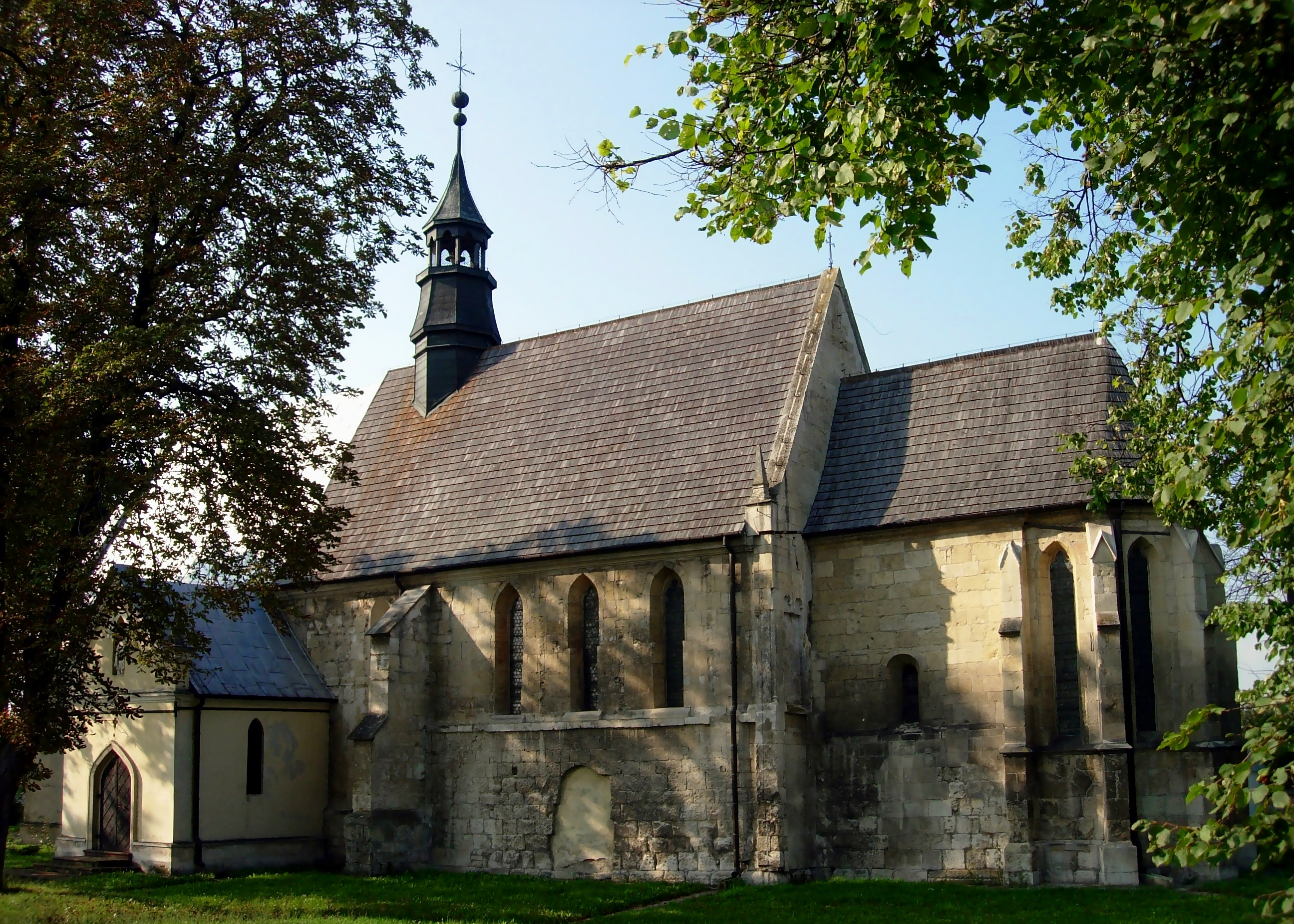
- Church

- Location within Poland
- Coordinates: 50°25′N 20°36′E
- Country: Poland
- Voivodeship: Świętokrzyskie
- County: Pińczów
- Gmina: Pińczów

Stara Zagość [ˈstara ˈzaɡɔɕt͡ɕ] is a village in the administrative district of Gmina Pińczów, within Pińczów County, Świętokrzyskie Voivodeship, in south-central Poland. It lies approximately 14 km (9 mi) south of Pińczów and 52 km (32 mi) south of the regional capital Kielce.
