= Zawale Niegosławskie =

- Village
- Location within Poland
- Coordinates: 50°32′13″N 20°20′48″E
- Country: Poland
- Voivodeship: Świętokrzyskie
- County: Pińczów
- Gmina: Michałów

Zawale Niegosławskie [zaˈvalɛ ɲɛɡɔˈswafskʲɛ] is a village in the administrative district of Gmina Michałów, within Pińczów County, Świętokrzyskie Voivodeship, in south-central Poland.
