= Borków, Pińczów County =

Borków
- Village
- Location within Poland
- Coordinates: 50°33′40″N 20°38′31″E
- Country: Poland
- Voivodeship: Świętokrzyskie
- County: Pińczów
- Gmina: Pińczów

Borków [ˈbɔrkuf] is a village in the administrative district of Gmina Pińczów, within Pińczów County, Świętokrzyskie Voivodeship, in south-central Poland. It lies approximately 9 km (6 mi) east of Pińczów and 36 km (22 mi) south of the regional capital Kielce.
