= Włochy, Pińczów County =

Włochy
- Village
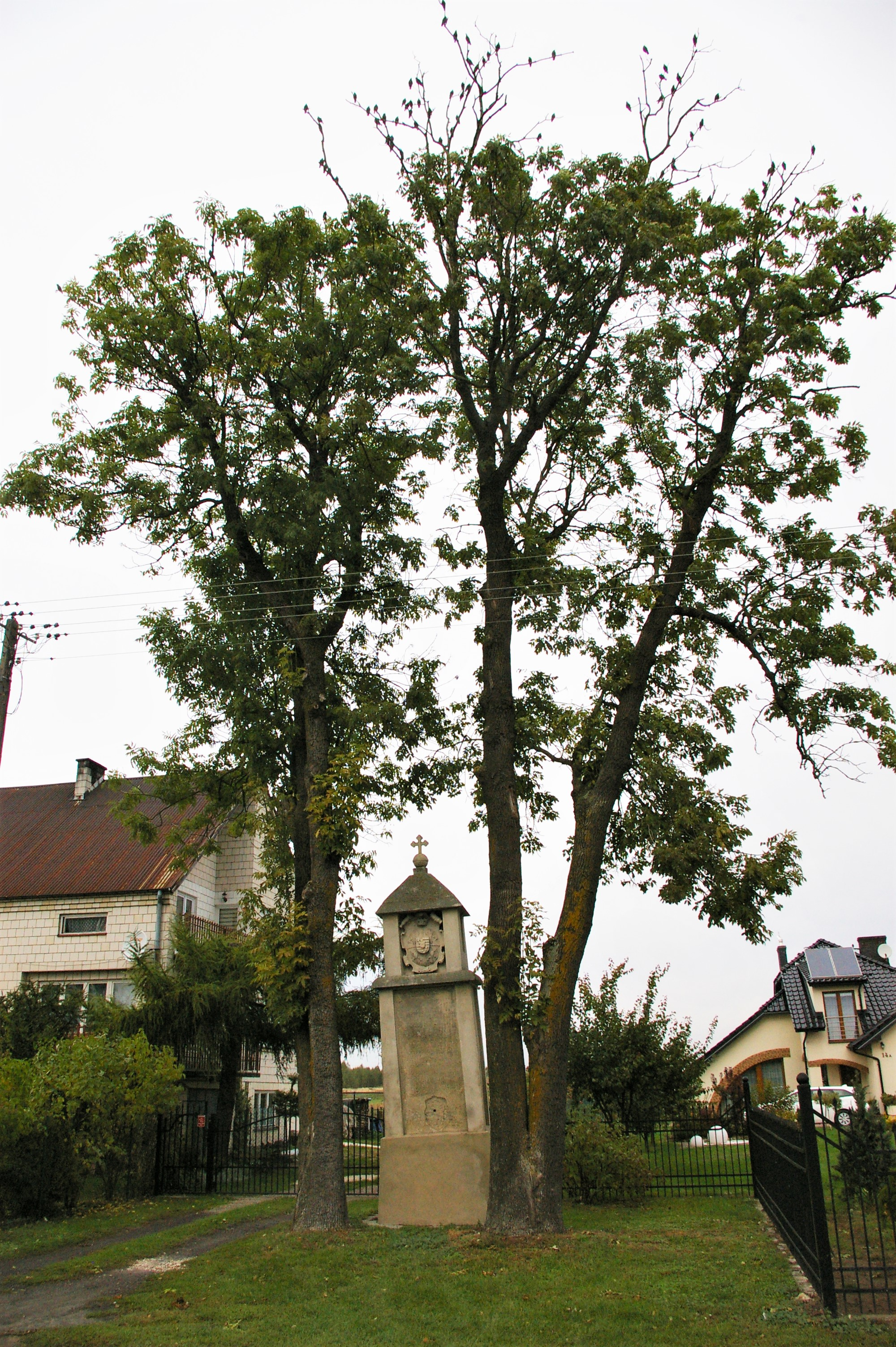

- Location within Poland
- Coordinates: 50°32′N 20°34′E
- Country: Poland
- Voivodeship: Świętokrzyskie
- County: Pińczów
- Gmina: Pińczów
- Population (approx.): 260

Włochy [ˈvwɔxɨ] is a village in the administrative district of Gmina Pińczów, within Pińczów County, Świętokrzyskie Voivodeship, in south-central Poland. It lies approximately 3 km (2 mi) east of Pińczów and 39 km (24 mi) south of the regional capital Kielce.
