= Gmina Michałów =

Gmina Michałów Michałów Commune
- Gmina
- Coat of arms
- Interactive map of Gmina Michałów
- Coordinates (Michałów): 50°29′35″N 20°27′36″E
- Country: Poland
- Voivodeship: Świętokrzyskie
- County: Pińczów
- Seat: Michałów

Area
  - Total: 112.21 km^{2} (43.32 sq mi)

Population (2006)
  - Total: 4,839
  - Density: 43.12/km^{2} (111.7/sq mi)
- Website: http://www.michalow.pl

Gmina Michałów is a rural gmina (administrative district) in Pińczów County, Świętokrzyskie Voivodeship, in south-central Poland. Its seat is the village of Michałów, which lies approximately 7 kilometres (4 mi) south-west of Pińczów and 45 km (28 mi) south of the regional capital Kielce.

The gmina covers an area of 112.21 square kilometres (43.3 sq mi), and as of 2006 its total population is 4,840.

The gmina contains parts of the protected areas called Kozubów Landscape Park and Nida Landscape Park.

== Villages ==
Gmina Michałów contains the villages and settlements of Góry, Jelcza Mała, Jelcza Wielka, Karolów, Kołków, Michałów, Pawłowice, Polichno, Przecławka, Sadkówka, Sędowice, Tomaszów, Tur Dolny, Tur Górny, Tur-Piaski, Węchadłów, Wrocieryż, Zagajów, Zagajówek and Zawale Niegosławskie.

== Neighbouring gminas ==
Gmina Michałów is bordered by the gminas of Działoszyce, Imielno, Pińczów and Wodzisław.
