= Chwałowice, Świętokrzyskie Voivodeship =

Chwałowice
- Village
- Location within Poland
- Coordinates: 50°33′35″N 20°36′55″E
- Country: Poland
- Voivodeship: Świętokrzyskie
- County: Pińczów
- Gmina: Pińczów

Chwałowice [xfawɔˈvit͡sɛ] is a village in the administrative district of Gmina Pińczów, within Pińczów County, Świętokrzyskie Voivodeship, in south-central Poland. It lies approximately 7 km (4 mi) north-east of Pińczów and 36 km (22 mi) south of the regional capital Kielce.
