= Gmina Pińczów =

Gmina Pińczów Pińczów Commune
- Gmina
- Flag Coat of arms
- Interactive map of Gmina Pińczów
- Coordinates (Pińczów): 50°32′N 20°32′E
- Country: Poland
- Voivodeship: Świętokrzyskie
- County: Pińczów
- Seat: Pińczów

Area
  - Total: 212.75 km^{2} (82.14 sq mi)

Population (2006)
  - Total: 22,147
  - Density: 104.10/km^{2} (269.61/sq mi)
  - Urban: 11,886
  - Rural: 10,261
- Website: http://www.pinczow.com.pl

Gmina Pińczów is an urban-rural gmina (administrative district) in Pińczów County, Świętokrzyskie Voivodeship, in south-central Poland. Its seat is the town of Pińczów, which lies approximately 40 kilometres (25 mi) south of the regional capital Kielce.

The gmina covers an area of 212.75 square kilometres (82.1 sq mi), and as of 2006 its total population is 22,147 (out of which the population of Pińczów amounts to 11,886, and the population of the rural part of the gmina is 10,261).

The gmina contains part of the protected areas called Kozubów Landscape Park, Nida Landscape Park and Szaniec Landscape Park.

== Villages ==
Apart from the town of Pińczów, Gmina Pińczów contains the villages and settlements of Aleksandrów, Bogucice Drugie, Bogucice Pierwsze, Borków, Brzeście, Bugaj, Byczów, Chrabków, Chruścice, Chwałowice, Gacki, Grochowiska, Kopernia, Kowala, Kozubów, Krzyżanowice Dolne, Krzyżanowice Średnie, Leszcze, Marzęcin, Młodzawy Duże, Młodzawy Małe, Mozgawa, Nowa Zagość, Orkanów, Pasturka, Podłęże, Sadek, Skowronno Dolne, Skowronno Górne, Skrzypiów, Stara Zagość, Szarbków, Szczypiec, Uników, Winiary, Włochy, Wola Zagojska Dolna, Wola Zagojska Górna, Zagórzyce, Zakrzów and Zawarża.

== Neighbouring gminas ==
Gmina Pińczów is bordered by the gminas of Busko-Zdrój, Chmielnik, Czarnocin, Działoszyce, Imielno, Kije, Michałów, Wiślica and Złota.
