= Michałów, Pińczów County =

Michałów
- Village
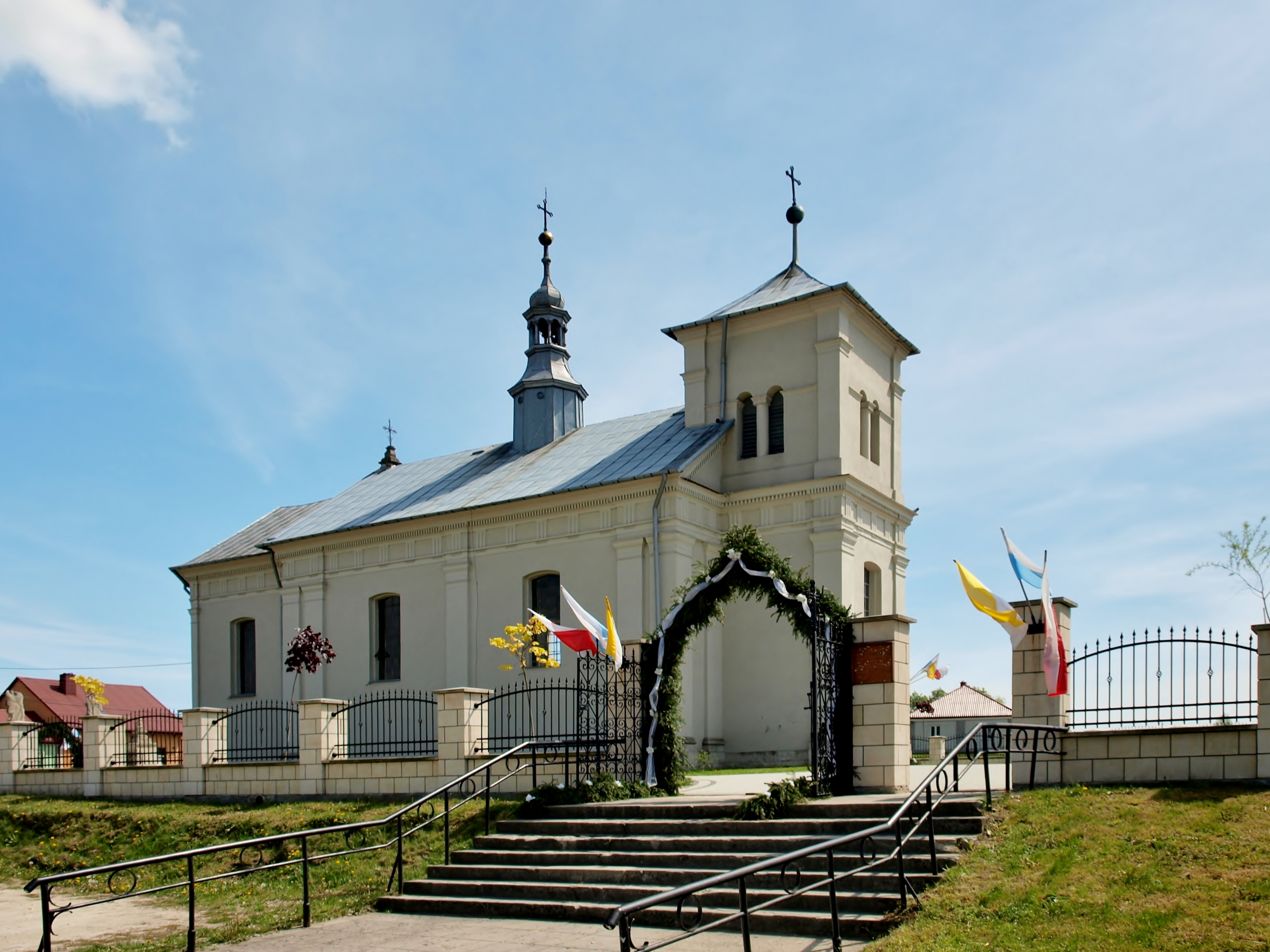

- Coat of arms

- Location within Poland
- Coordinates: 50°29′35″N 20°27′36″E
- Country: Poland
- Voivodeship: Świętokrzyskie
- County: Pińczów
- Gmina: Michałów
- Website: https://www.michalow.pl

Michałów [miˈxawuf] is a village in Pińczów County, Świętokrzyskie Voivodeship, in south-central Poland. It is the seat of the gmina (administrative district) called Gmina Michałów. It lies approximately 7 km (4 mi) south-west of Pińczów and 45 km (28 mi) south of the regional capital Kielce.

Michałów State Stud is the largest Arabian horse farm in Poland.
