= Pac Palace, Dowspuda =

Pac Palace in Dowspuda
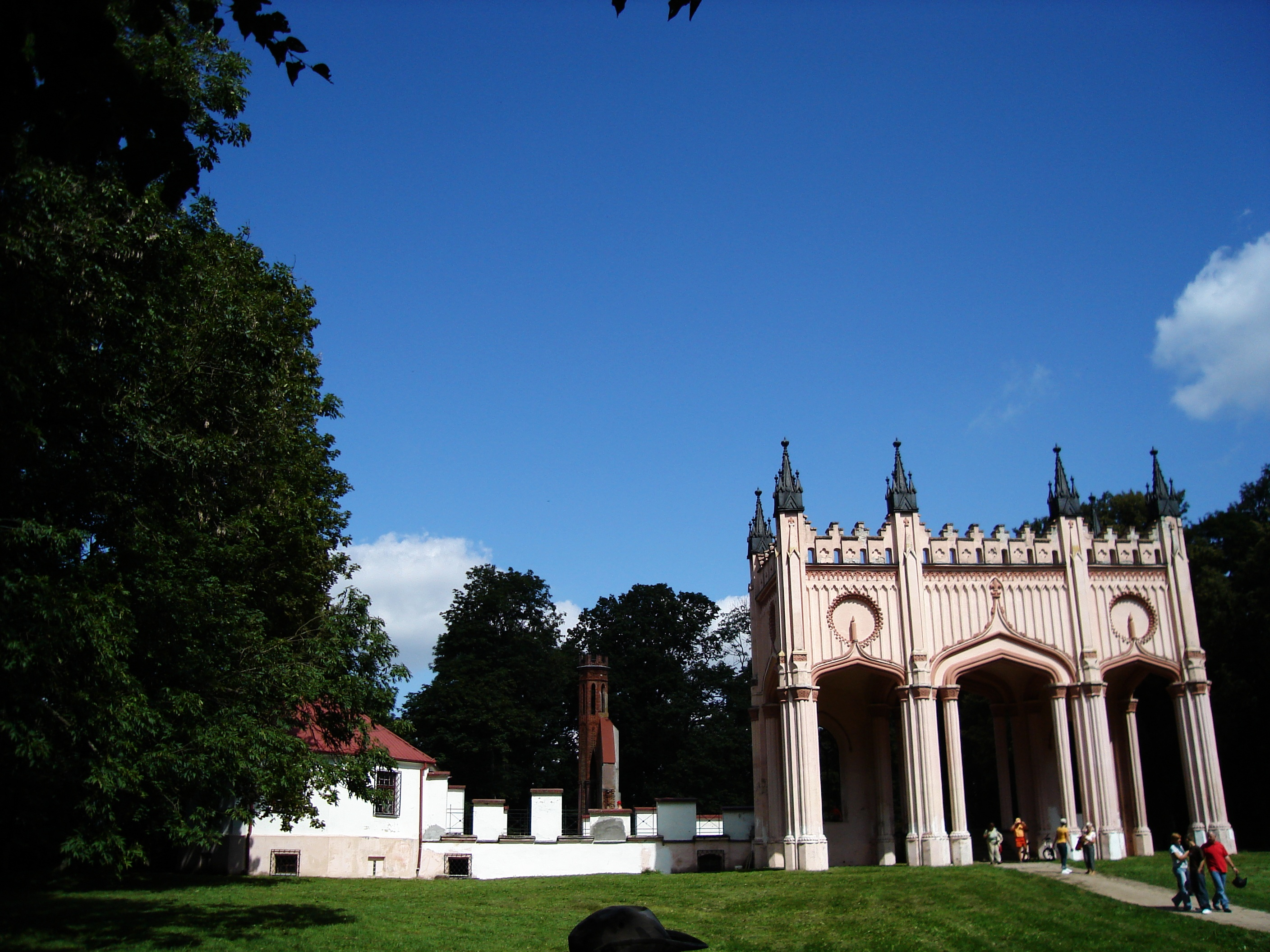
- Pac Palace ruins, portico remains

- Location of Pac Palace in Poland
- 53°58′42″N 22°48′07″E
- Location: Dowspuda, Podlaskie Voivodeship; in Poland

History
- Built: 1827
- Demolished: 1867
- Rebuilt: Under reconstruction (planned for 2023)

Site notes
- Architect: Piotr Bosio
- Architectural style: Gothic Revival

Pac Palace in Dowspuda (Polish: Pałac Paców w Dowspudzie) - historical ruins, located in Dowspuda, Poland.

Pac Palace is built in an English Neo-Gothic architectural style by Polish architect of Italian descent Piotr Bosio. The construction work began in 1820, and after a temporary halt, continued under architect Enrico Marconi. Although the main construct work was complete by that time, it took another four years to furnish and decorate the palace.

After the November Uprising, Ludwik Michał Pac emigrated, and his property was confiscated by the Imperial Government. The next owners did not upkeep the property and it was decided to deconstruct the palace in 1867. I 2016, the palace ruins with twenty-one hectares of land was sold to a private investor for 1 million zlotys, who has declared a total reconstruction of the palace and its transformation into a hotel.

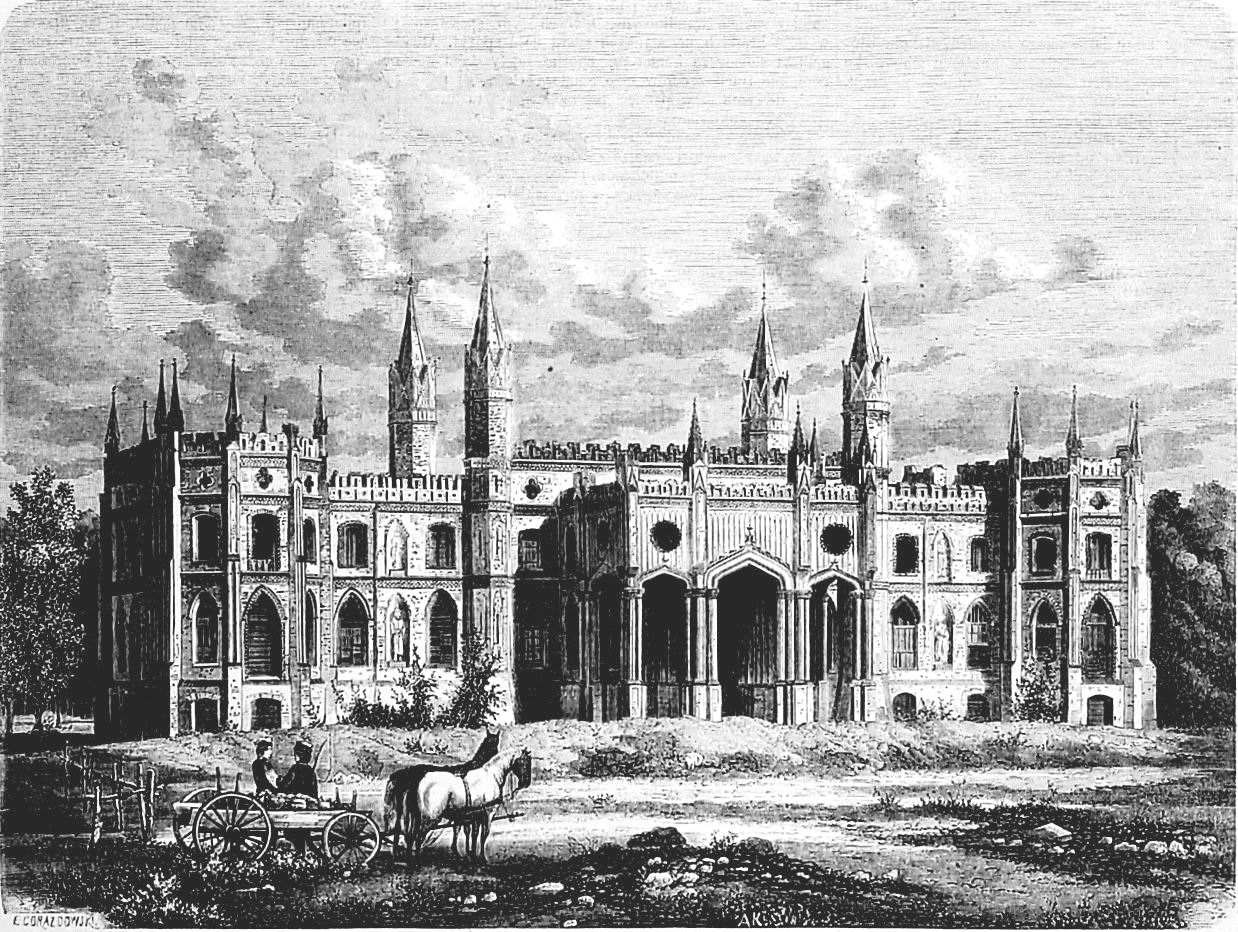
Pac Palace print from the 19th century

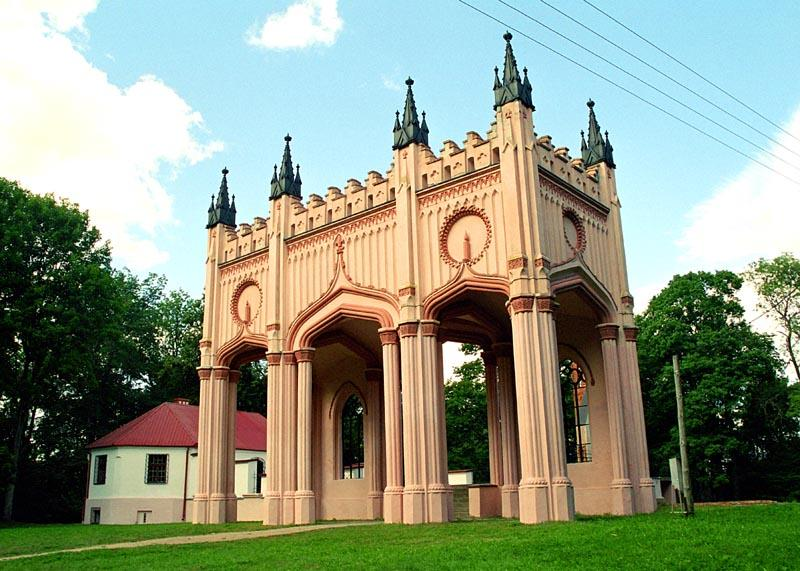
Side view of the remaining portico

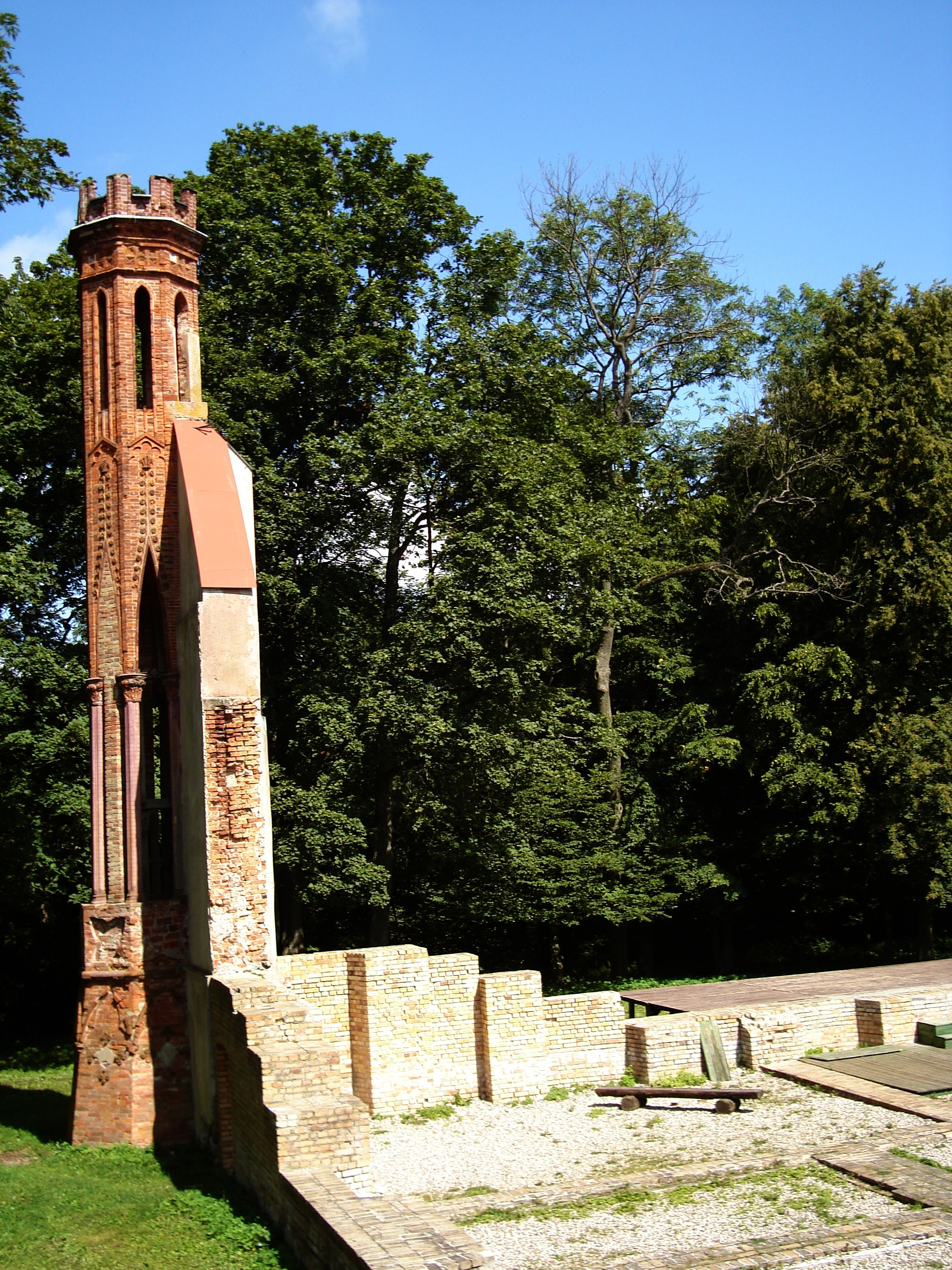
Remaining tower
