= Church of Saints Peter and Paul, Razhanka =

Church in Razhanka, Belarus

Coordinates: 53°32′13″N 24°43′57″E

Church of Saints Peter and Paul
- Касцёл Святых апосталаў Пятра і Паўла
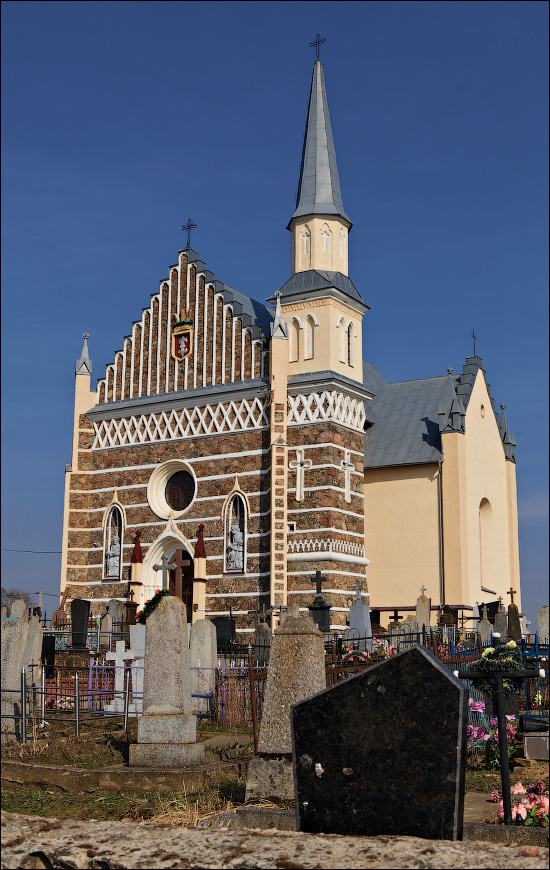
- Church of Saints Peter and Paul
- Location: Razhanka
- Country: Belarus
- Denomination: Roman Catholic church

Architecture
- Years built: 1674, 1827

Administration
- Diocese: Roman Catholic Diocese of Grodno

The Church of Saints Peter and Paul in Razhanka is a Roman Catholic church in Belarus. The building was constructed in 1674 and rebuilt in 1827, it is included into the national historic heritage list.

== History ==
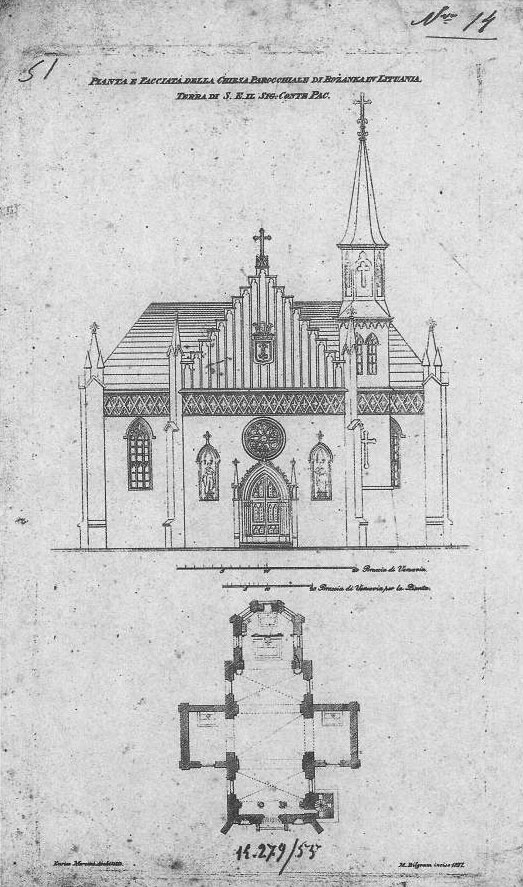
Construction scheme, H. Markoni, 1827

The first in parish in Razhanka was founded in the second part of the 17th century. Some sources place construction date as early as 1674, however, other believe it could have been built in the late 16th century for the Calvinists and given to the Catholics later. However, the Catholics reject this hypothesis. According to the documents, the church was consecrated on June 17, 1674, in the name of Saint Peter and St Paul.

In 1827, the church was rebuilt by order of Count Ludwik Michał Pac. The architect Enrico Marconi reconstructed it in Neo Gothic style that was spreading in England in the second part of the 18th century. Some researchers presume that Marconi rebuilt the church completely and the building opened in 1827 should be considered a new one.

In 1924–1925, another restoration was made without changing the church's exterior.

In 1960, the church was closed by order of the Soviet authorities, a grocery shop was opened in the building. In 1989 it was returned to the Catholic church, restored and reopened in 1990.

== Architecture ==
The church is a historical monument of Neo Gothic style, though some art historians describe it as eclectic.

The single nave is topped by a low pentagon-shaped apse. Two symmetrical side chapels are connected to the side walls of the main volume. A small sacristy is located to the north part of the apse. At the south-west side of the church there is a three-tire bell tower. On both sides of the main entrance sculptures of St Paul and St Peter are standing in the niches. The facades are covered with Rubble masonry.

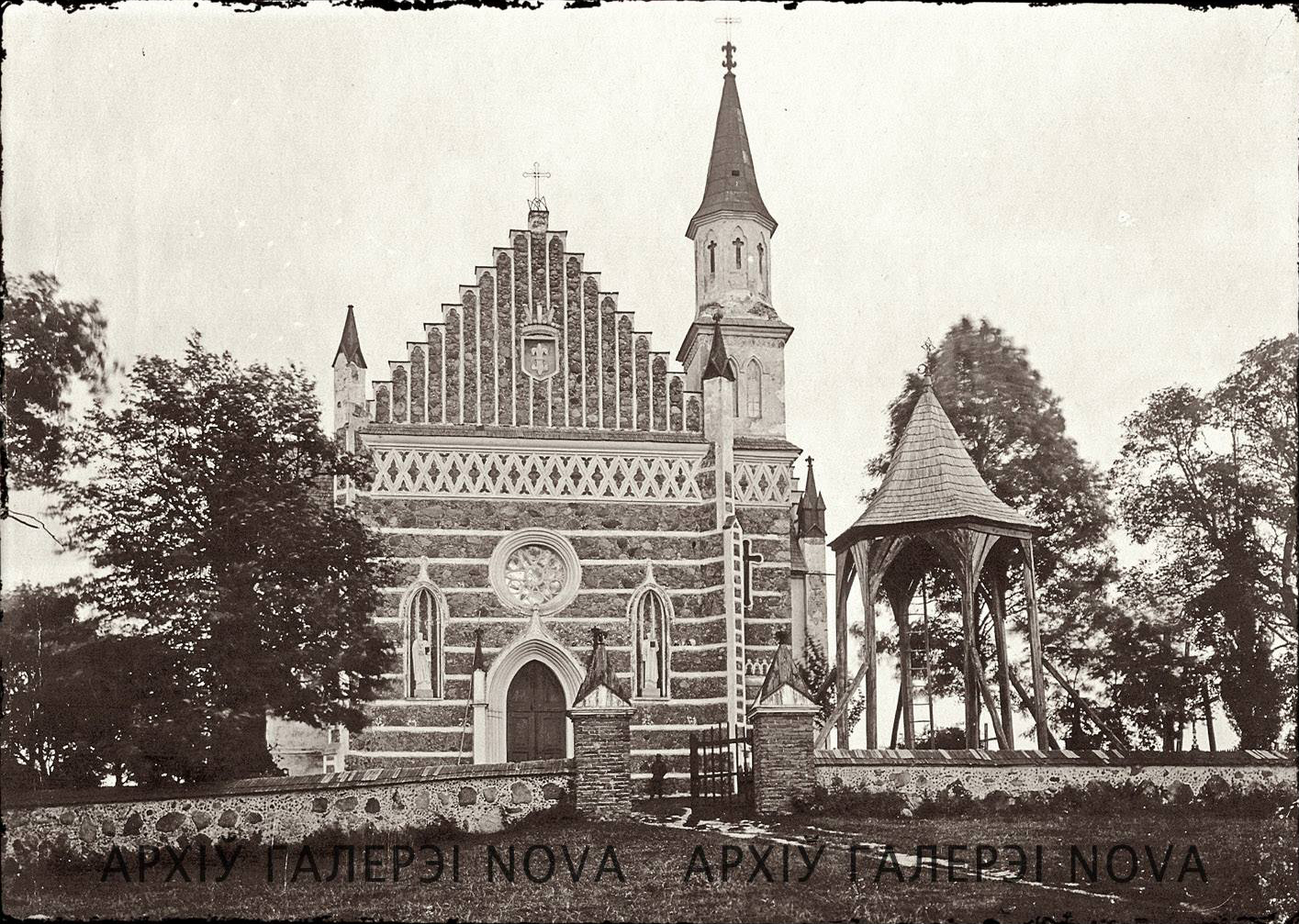
The church in 1900
