= Nieprowice =

- Village
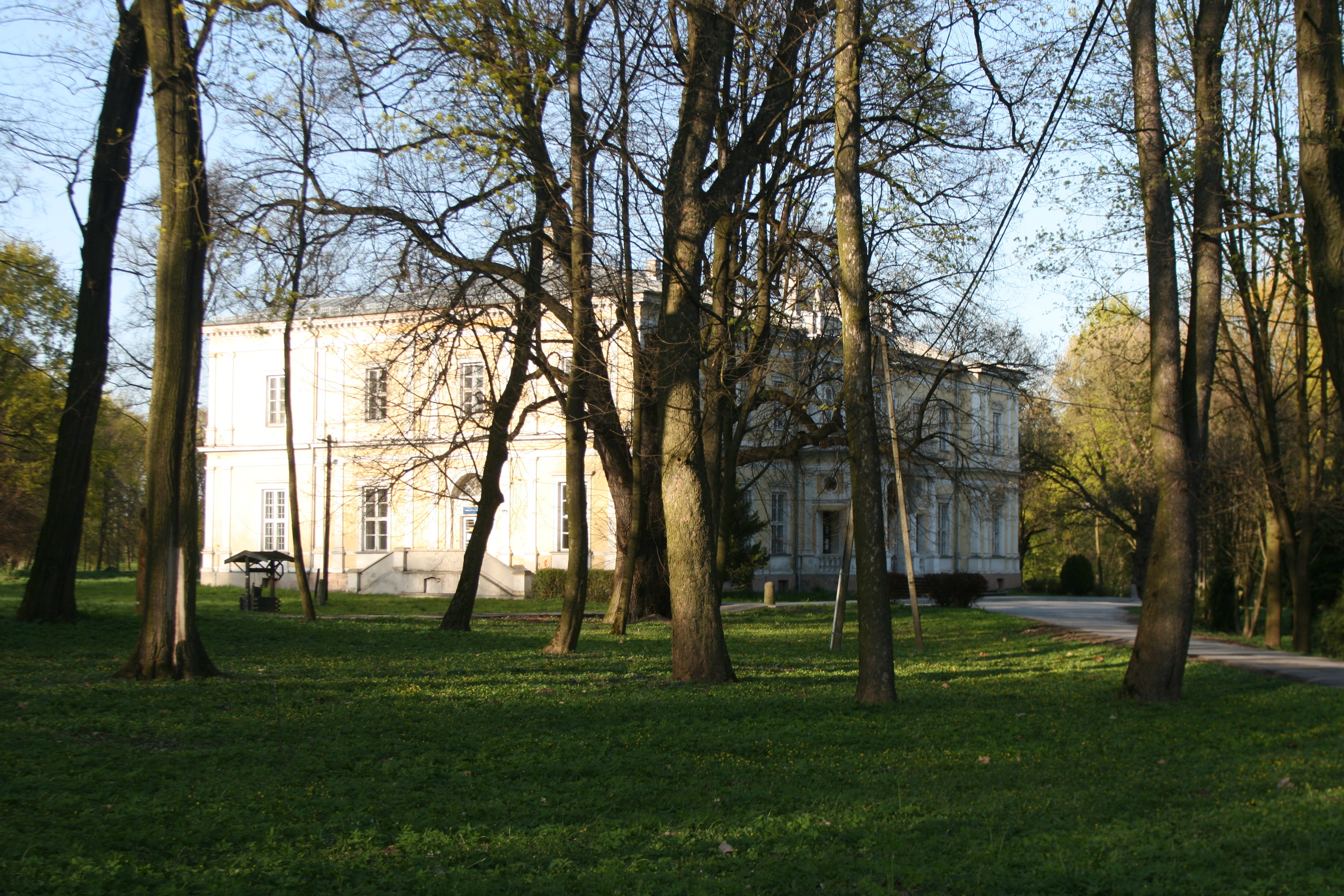

- Location within Poland
- Coordinates: 50°24′8″N 20°34′57″E
- Country: Poland
- Voivodeship: Świętokrzyskie
- County: Pińczów
- Gmina: Złota

Nieprowice [ɲɛprɔˈvit͡sɛ] is a village in the administrative district of Gmina Złota, within Pińczów County, Świętokrzyskie Voivodeship, in south-central Poland. It lies approximately 3 km (2 mi) north of Złota, 15 km (9 mi) south of Pińczów, and 54 km (34 mi) south of the regional capital Kielce.
