= Probołowice =

- Village
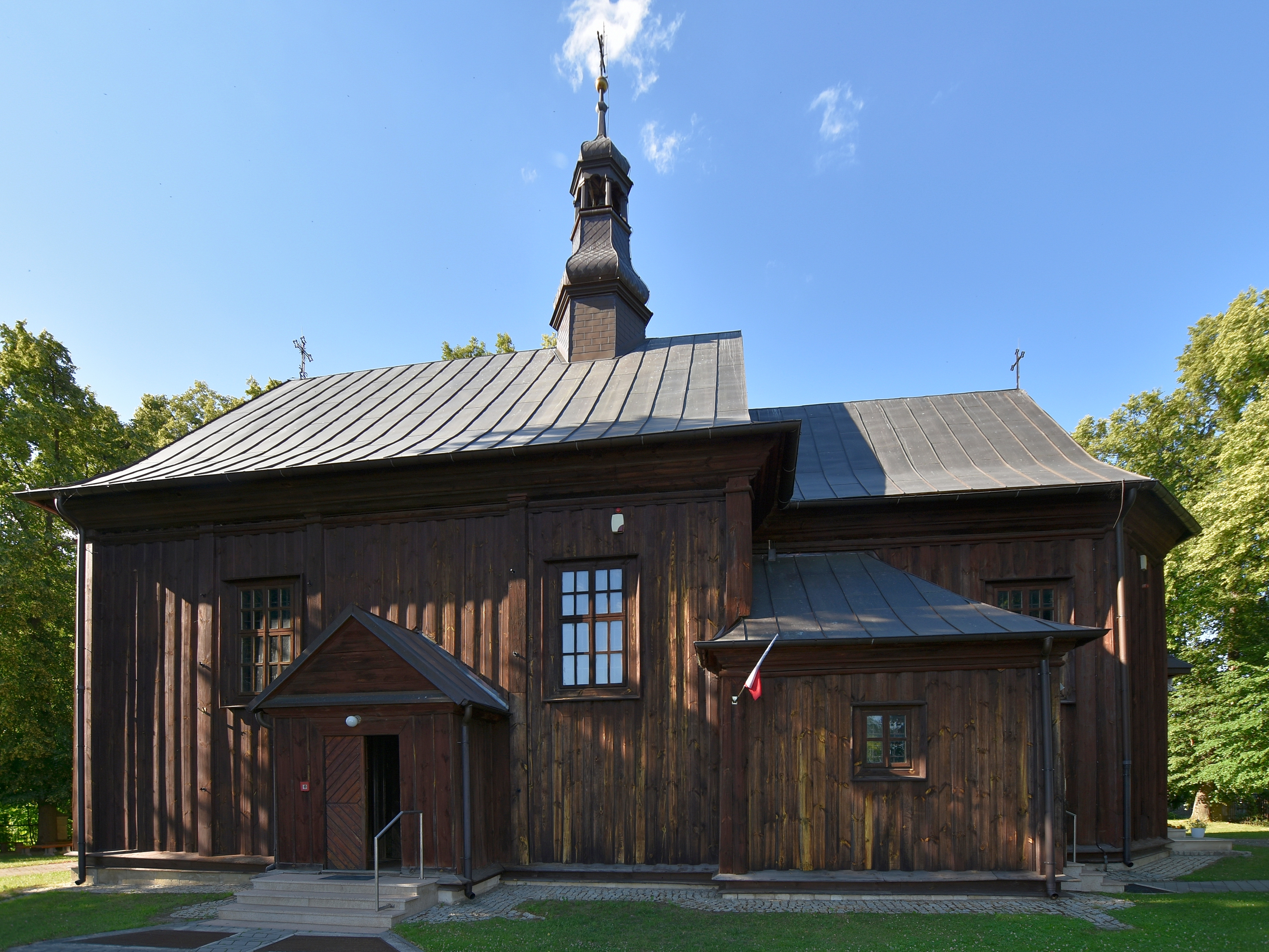
- Church

- Location within Poland
- Coordinates: 50°21′N 20°33′E
- Country: Poland
- Voivodeship: Świętokrzyskie
- County: Pińczów
- Gmina: Złota

Probołowice [prɔbɔwɔˈvit͡sɛ] is a village in the administrative district of Gmina Złota, within Pińczów County, Świętokrzyskie Voivodeship, in south-central Poland. It lies approximately 5 km (3 mi) south-west of Złota, 21 km (13 mi) south of Pińczów, and 60 km (37 mi) south of the regional capital Kielce.

== See also ==
- Lesser Polish Way
