= Odrzywół =

Odrzywół may refer to the following places:

- Odrzywół, Przysucha County in Masovian Voivodeship (east-central Poland)
- Odrzywół, Warsaw West County in Masovian Voivodeship (east-central Poland)
- Odrzywół, Świętokrzyskie Voivodeship (south-central Poland)
