= Żurawniki, Pińczów County =

Żurawniki
- Village
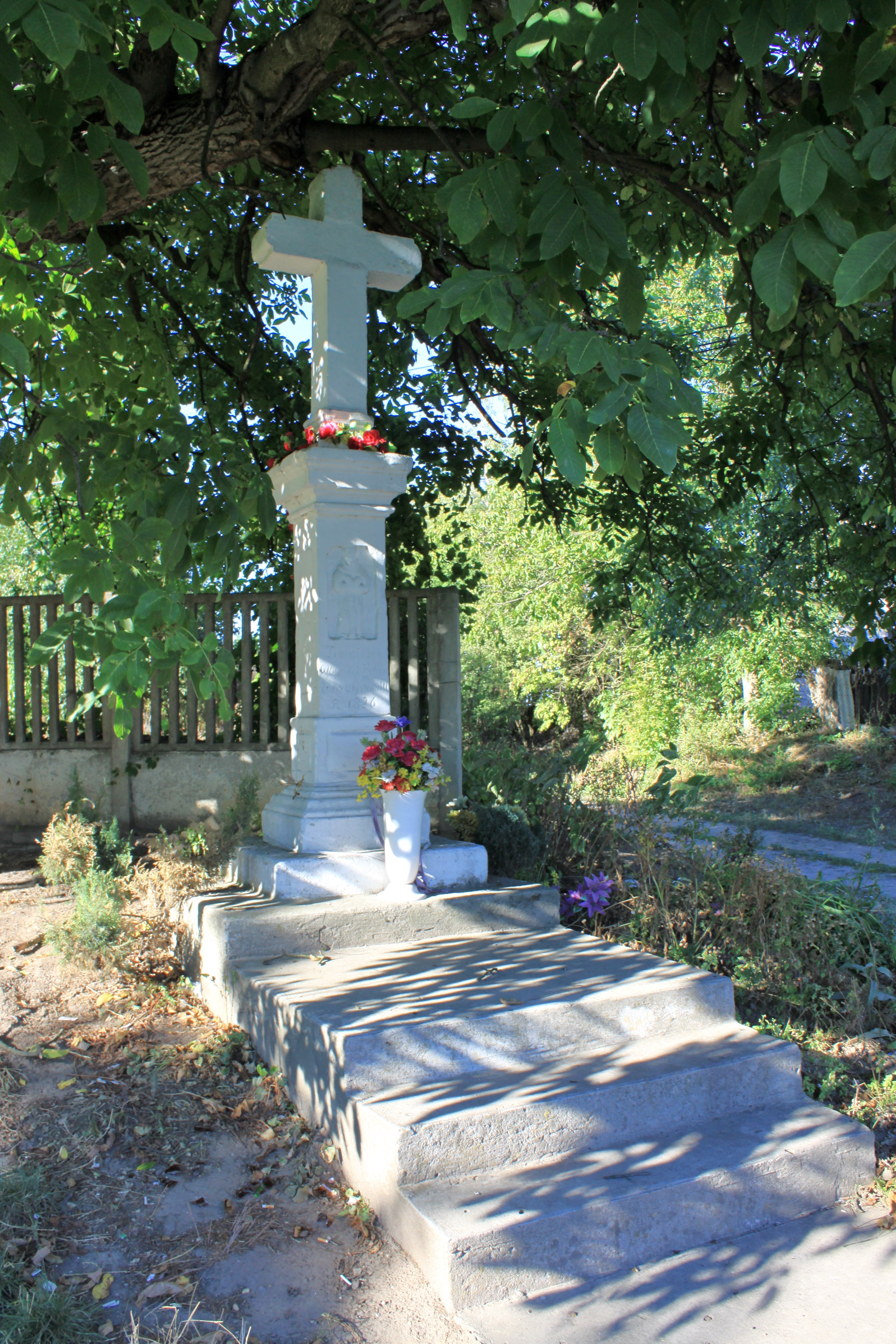

- Location within Poland
- Coordinates: 50°22′44″N 20°37′47″E
- Country: Poland
- Voivodeship: Świętokrzyskie
- County: Pińczów
- Gmina: Złota
- Population: 210

Żurawniki [ʐuravˈniki] is a village in the administrative district of Gmina Złota, within Pińczów County, Świętokrzyskie Voivodeship, in south-central Poland. It lies approximately 3 km (2 mi) east of Złota, 19 km (12 mi) south of Pińczów, and 56 km (35 mi) south of the regional capital Kielce.
