= Niegosławice, Pińczów County =

Niegosławice
- Village
- Location within Poland
- Coordinates: 50°23′25″N 20°35′50″E
- Country: Poland
- Voivodeship: Świętokrzyskie
- County: Pińczów
- Gmina: Złota

Niegosławice [ɲɛɡɔswaˈvit͡sɛ] is a village in the administrative district of Gmina Złota, within Pińczów County, Świętokrzyskie Voivodeship, in south-central Poland. It lies approximately 2 km (1 mi) north of Złota, 17 km (11 mi) south of Pińczów, and 55 km (34 mi) south of the regional capital Kielce.

== Notable people ==
- Adolf Dygasiński, Polish writer
