= Stawiszyce =

- Village
- Location within Poland
- Coordinates: 50°20′N 20°36′E
- Country: Poland
- Voivodeship: Świętokrzyskie
- County: Pińczów
- Gmina: Złota

Stawiszyce [staviˈʂɨt͡sɛ] is a village in the administrative district of Gmina Złota, within Pińczów County, Świętokrzyskie Voivodeship, in south-central Poland. It lies approximately 6 km (4 mi) south of Złota, 23 km (14 mi) south of Pińczów, and 62 km (39 mi) south of the regional capital Kielce.
