= Korce (disambiguation) =

Korce or Korçë may refer to places:

- Korçë, a city in Albania
  - Korçë County, a county in Albania
  - Korçë District, a former administrative district in Albania
- Korce, Poland, a village in Poland
- Korce, a village and part of Dubá in the Czech Republic
