= Pełczyska, Świętokrzyskie Voivodeship =

Pełczyska
- Village
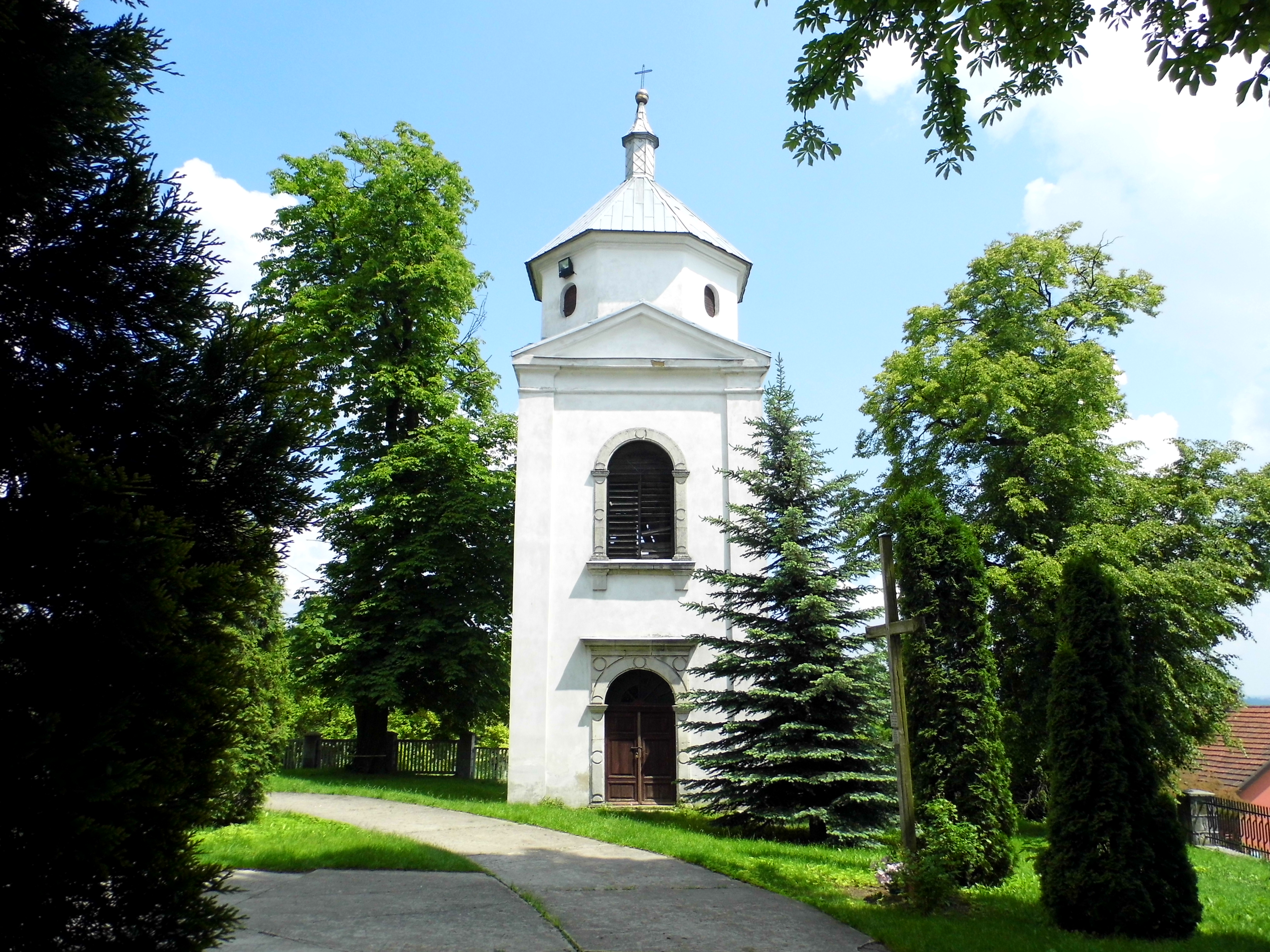
- Church

- Location within Poland
- Coordinates: 50°21′22″N 20°34′17″E
- Country: Poland
- Voivodeship: Świętokrzyskie
- County: Pińczów
- Gmina: Złota
- Population (approx.): 460

Pełczyska [pɛu̯ˈt͡ʂɨska] is a village in the administrative district of Gmina Złota, within Pińczów County, Świętokrzyskie Voivodeship, in south-central Poland. It lies approximately 3 km (2 mi) south-west of Złota, 20 km (12 mi) south of Pińczów, and 59 km (37 mi) south of the regional capital Kielce.

== See also ==
- The Lesser Polish Way
