= Wojsławice, Pińczów County =

Wojsławice
- Village
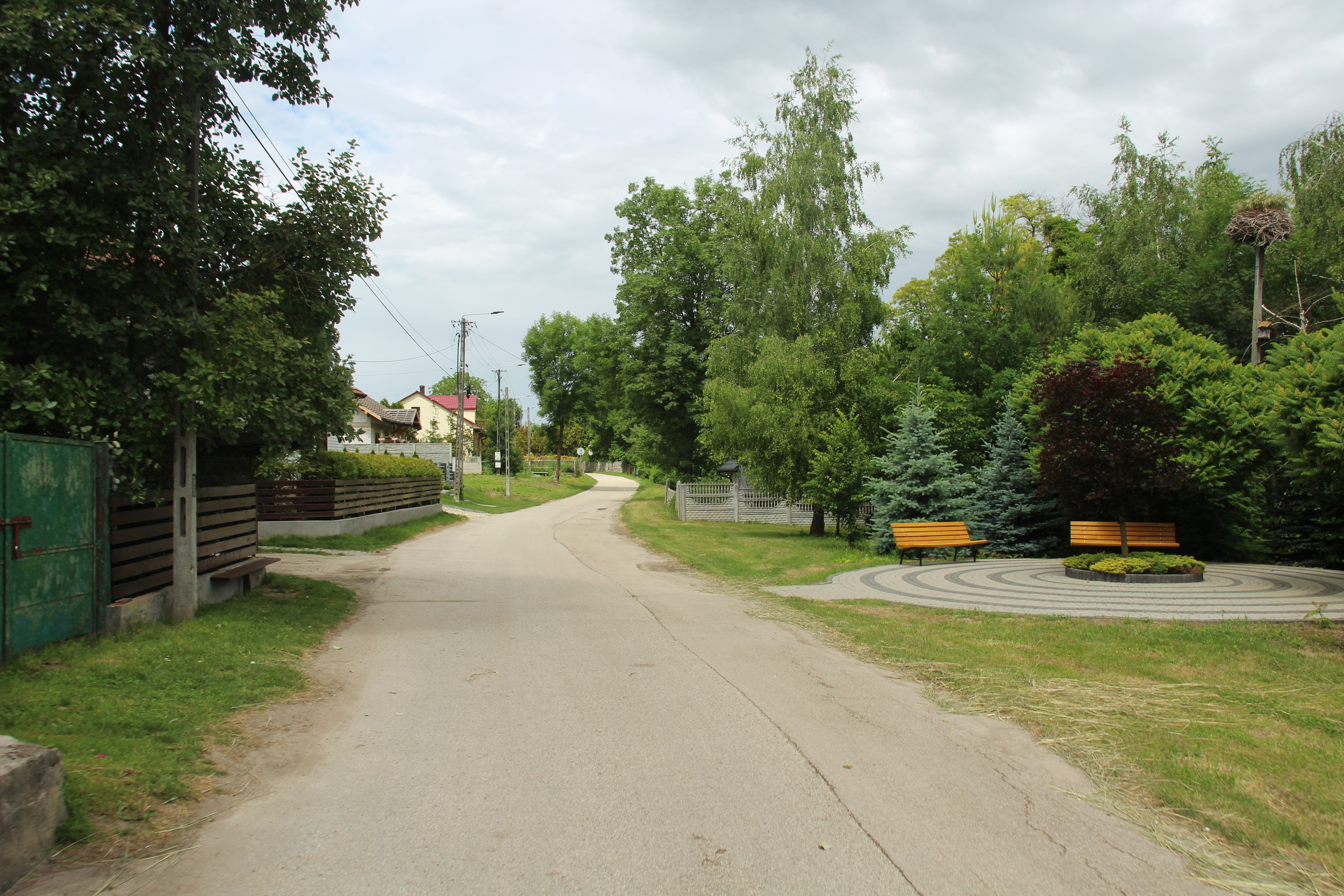

- Location within Poland
- Coordinates: 50°25′59″N 20°32′24″E
- Country: Poland
- Voivodeship: Świętokrzyskie
- County: Pińczów
- Gmina: Złota

Wojsławice [vɔi̯swaˈvit͡sɛ] is a village in the administrative district of Gmina Złota, within Pińczów County, Świętokrzyskie Voivodeship, in south-central Poland. It lies approximately 7 km (4 mi) north-west of Złota, 12 km (7 mi) south of Pińczów, and 51 km (32 mi) south of the regional capital Kielce.
