= Enrico Marconi =

Italian-Polish architect (1792–1863)

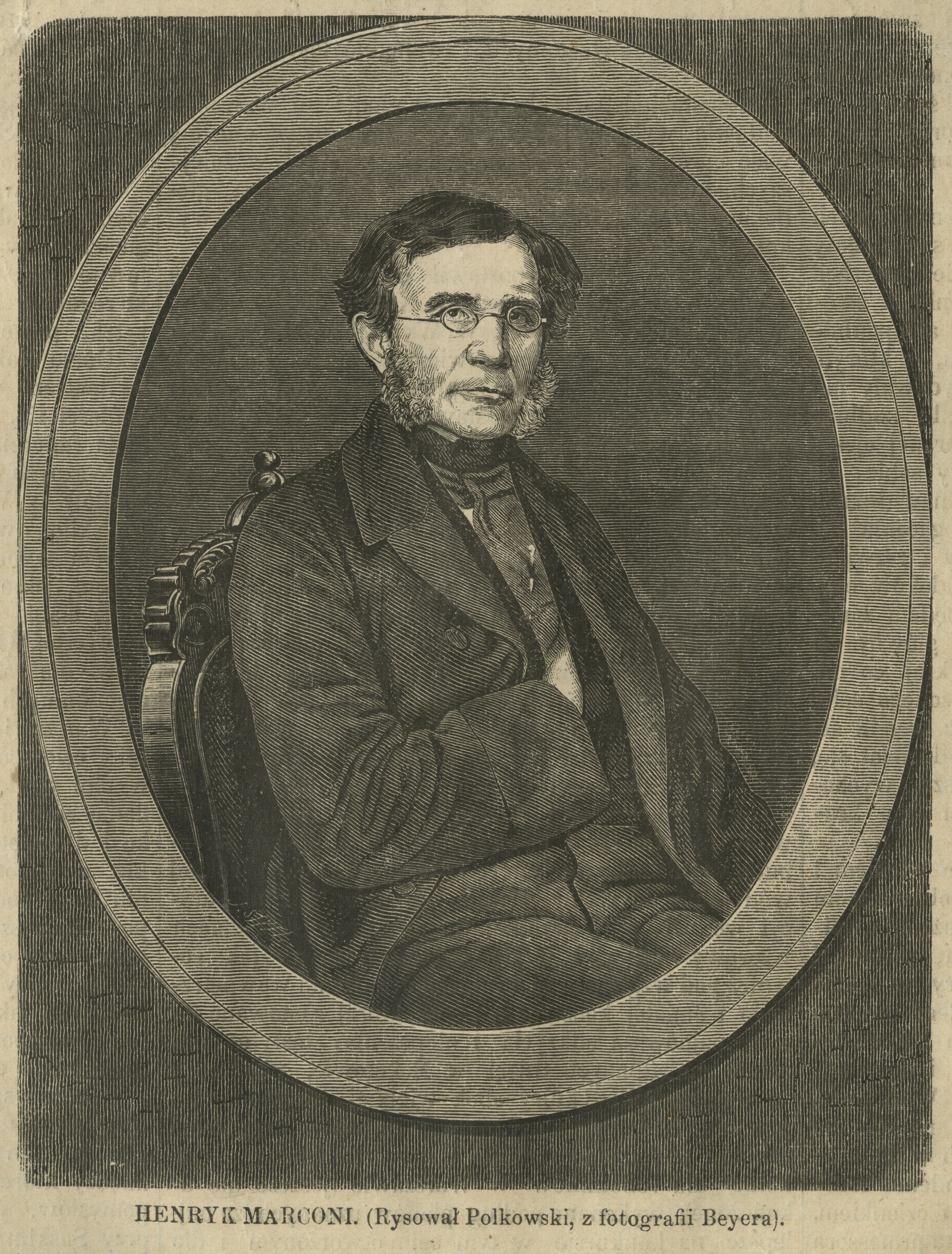
Enrico Marconi

Enrico Marconi, known in Poland as Henryk Marconi (7 January 1792 in Rome – 21 February 1863 in Warsaw), was an Italian-Polish architect who spent most of his life in Congress Poland.

Initially he was taught by his father Leander, later on, between 1806 and 1810, he studied both at the University of Bologna and at the Academy of Fine Arts of Bologna. In 1822 he was commissioned by general Ludwik Michał Pac to complete his palace in Dowspuda (then in Congress Poland, now in north-eastern Poland). He settled in Warsaw, where from 1827 he worked for the Council of State and where he became professor (1851–1858) at the Academy of Fine Arts.

Enrico Marconi married a daughter of general Pac's gardener, Małgorzata (English: Margaret) Heiton, who came from a Scottish family settled in Poland. One of their sons, Leandro Marconi, also became an architect. He is an ancestor of Carlo Acutis.

== Selected works ==
- Hotel Europejski in Warsaw
- Mausoleum of Stanisław Kostka Potocki in Wilanów
- The Pumping Room Building at Wilanów Palace
- Railway stations in Warsaw, Granica and Sosnowiec on the Warsaw–Vienna Railway
- Water tower in Saxon Garden, Warsaw
- Great Synagogue, Łomża
- All Saints Church, Warsaw
- Pawiak prison, Warsaw
- Palace of the Wielopolskis, Chroberz

== Gallery ==
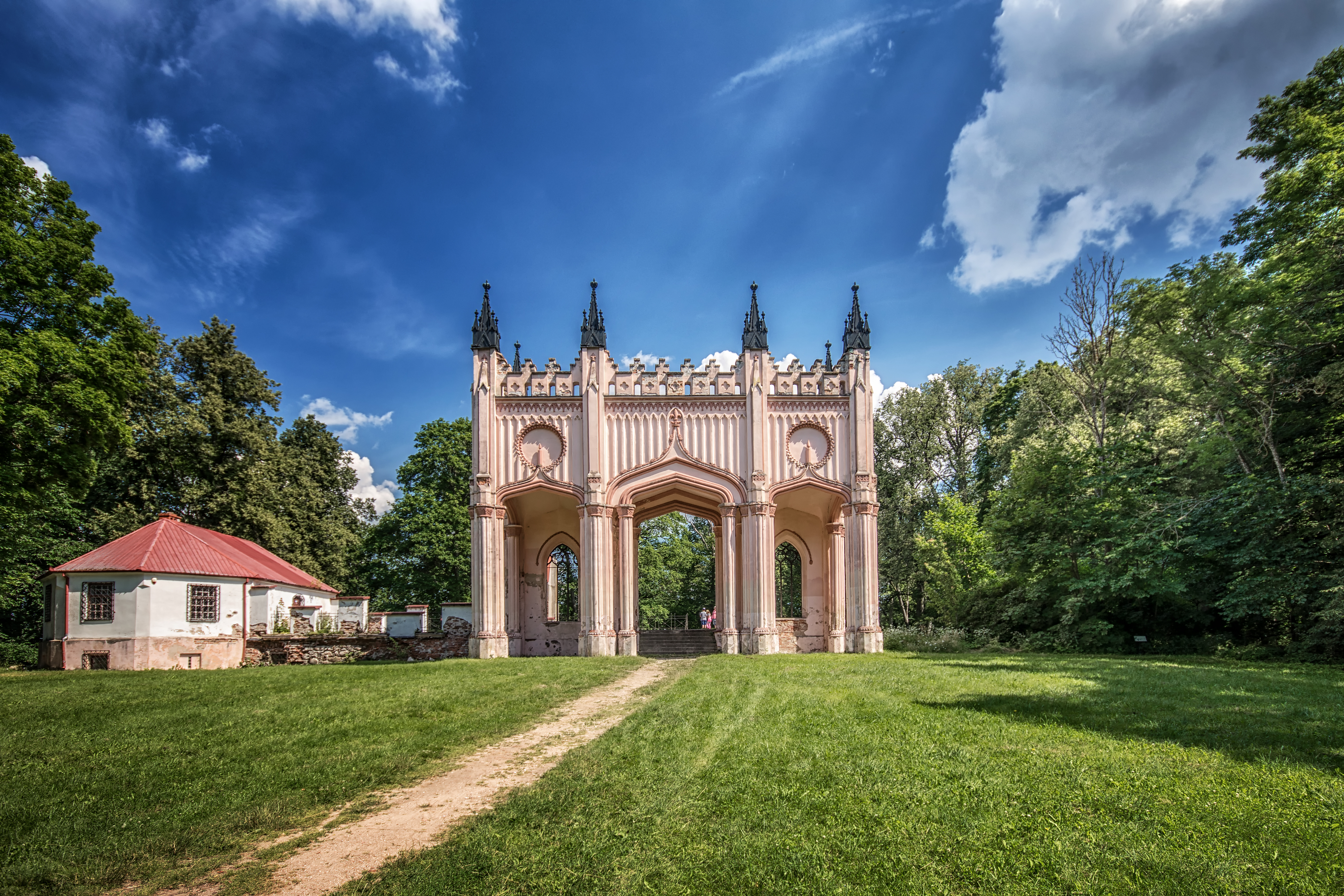
Remains of Pac Palace in Dowspuda

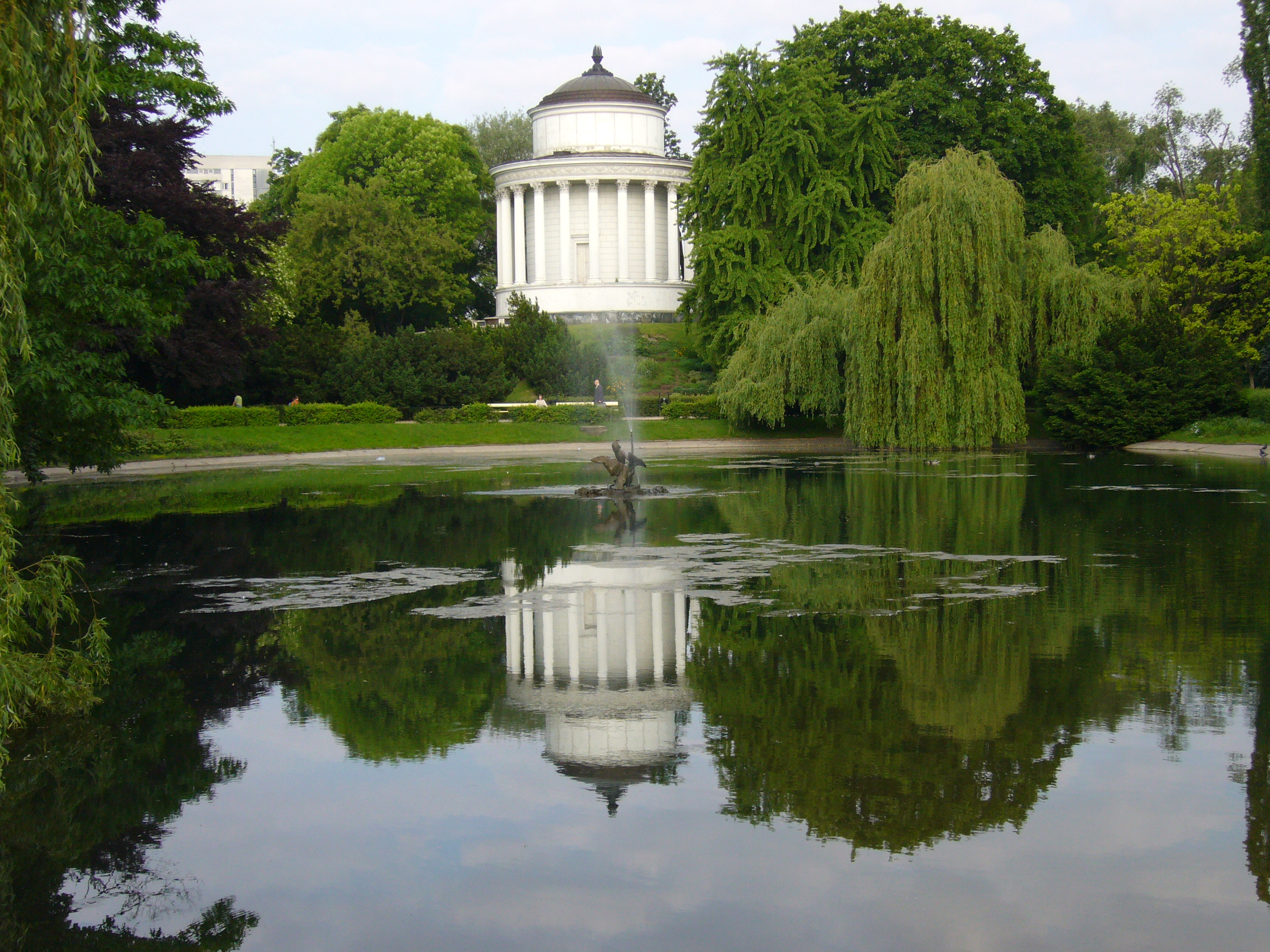
Water tower in Saxon Garden, Warsaw

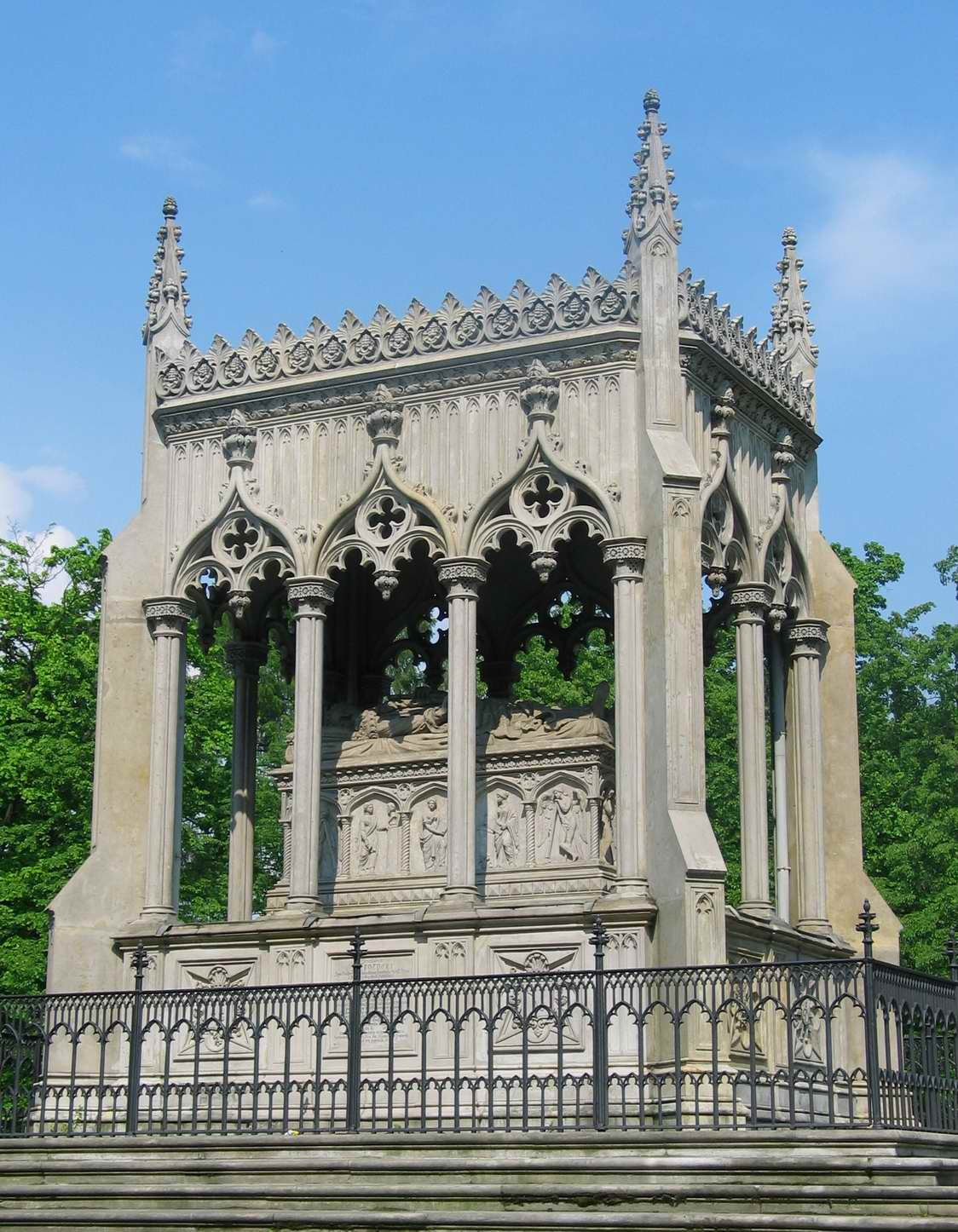
Mausoleum of Stanisław Kostka Potocki and his wife, Wilanów

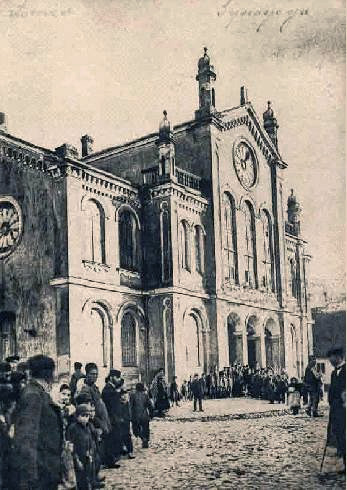
Great Synagogue, Lomza (destroyed)

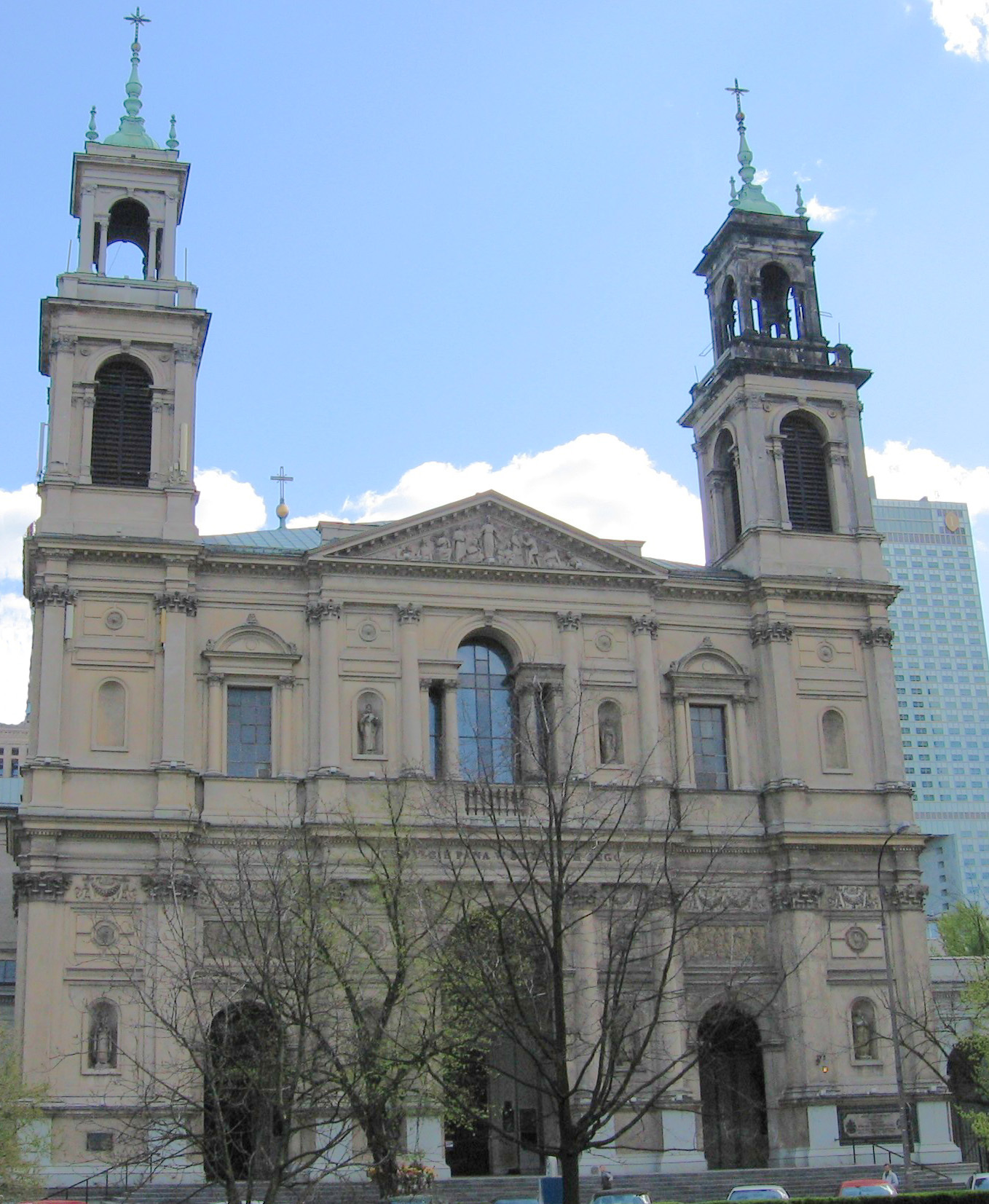
All Saints Church, Warsaw

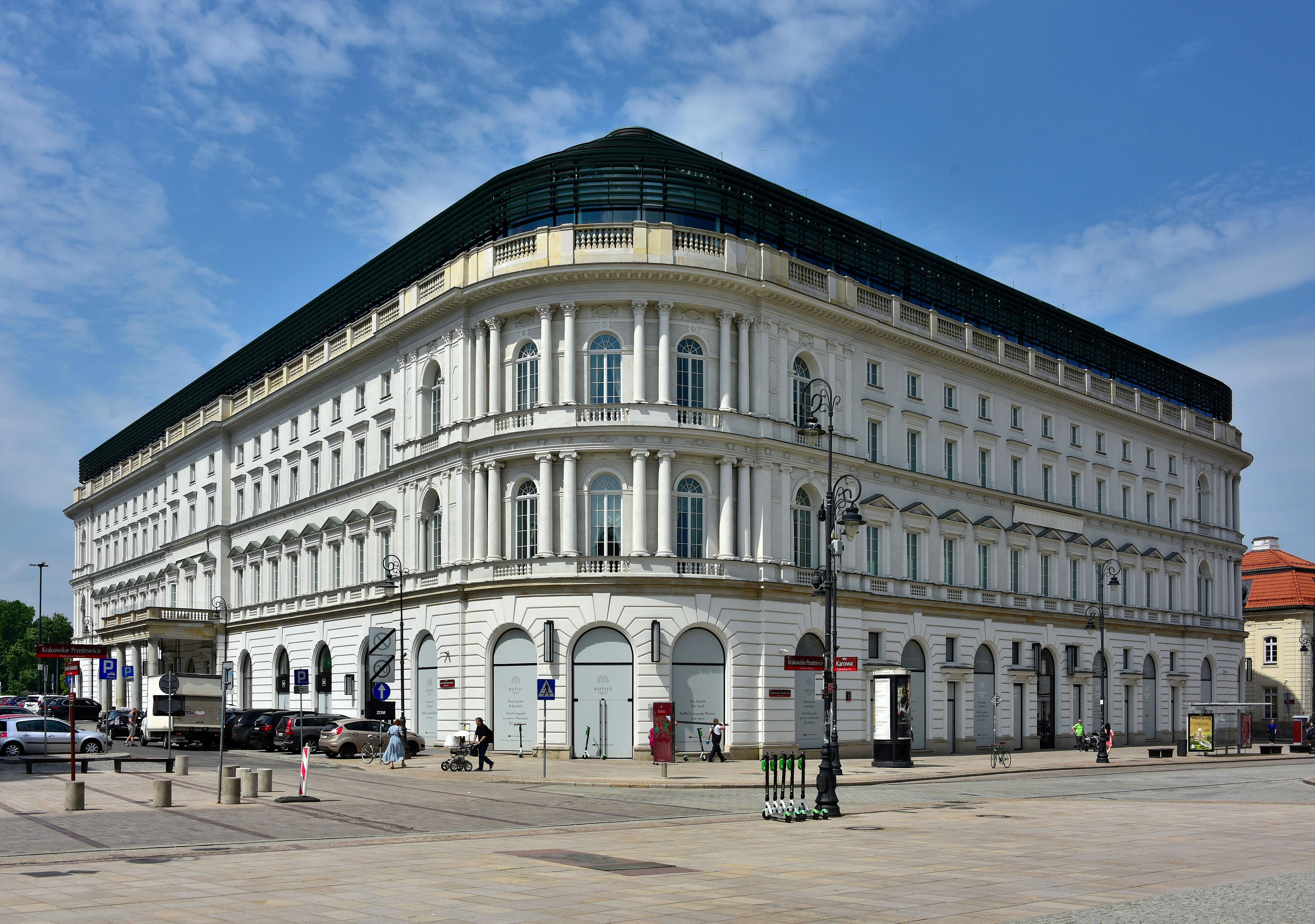
Hotel Europejski, Warsaw

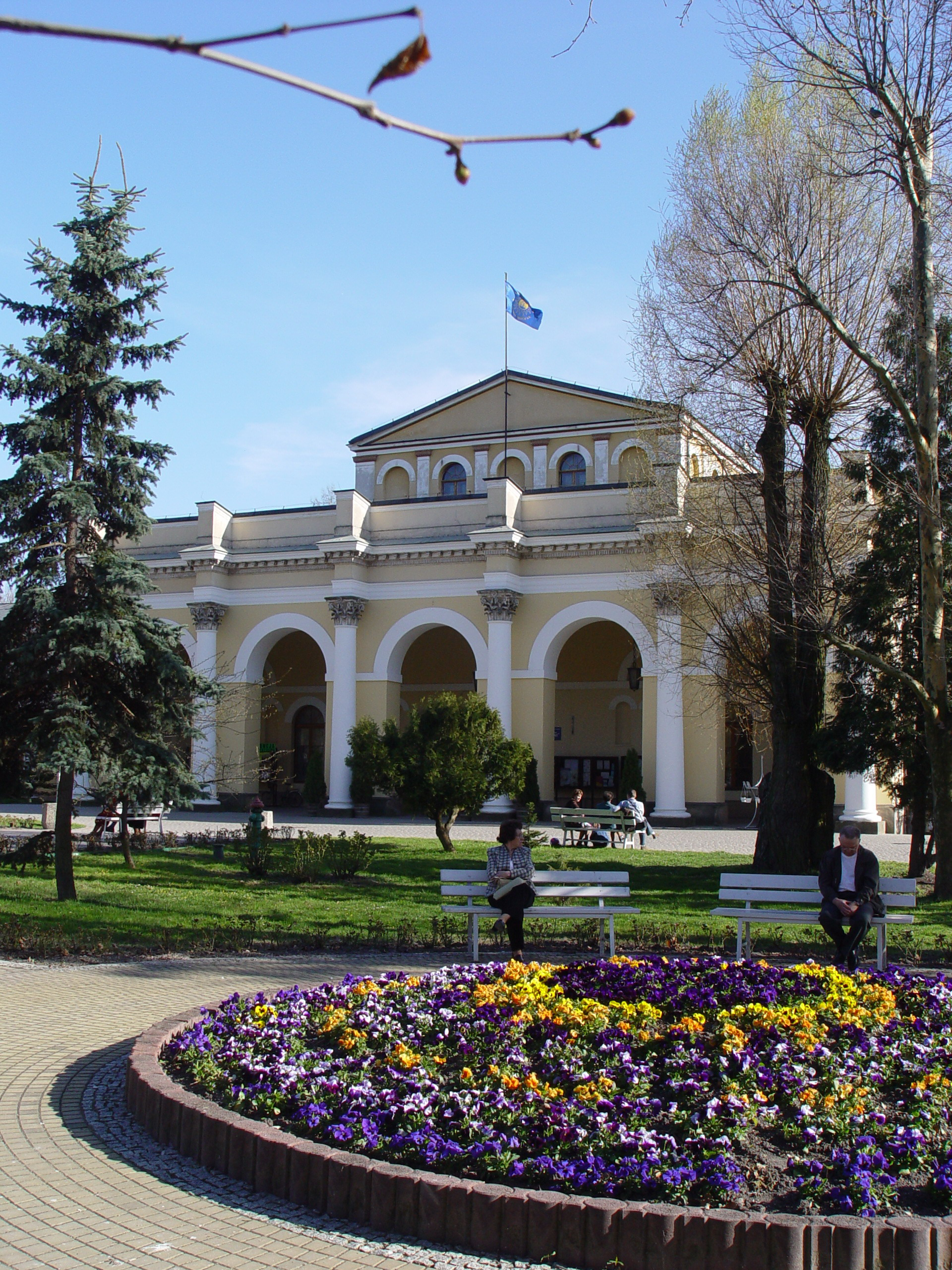
Spa House, Busko-Zdrój

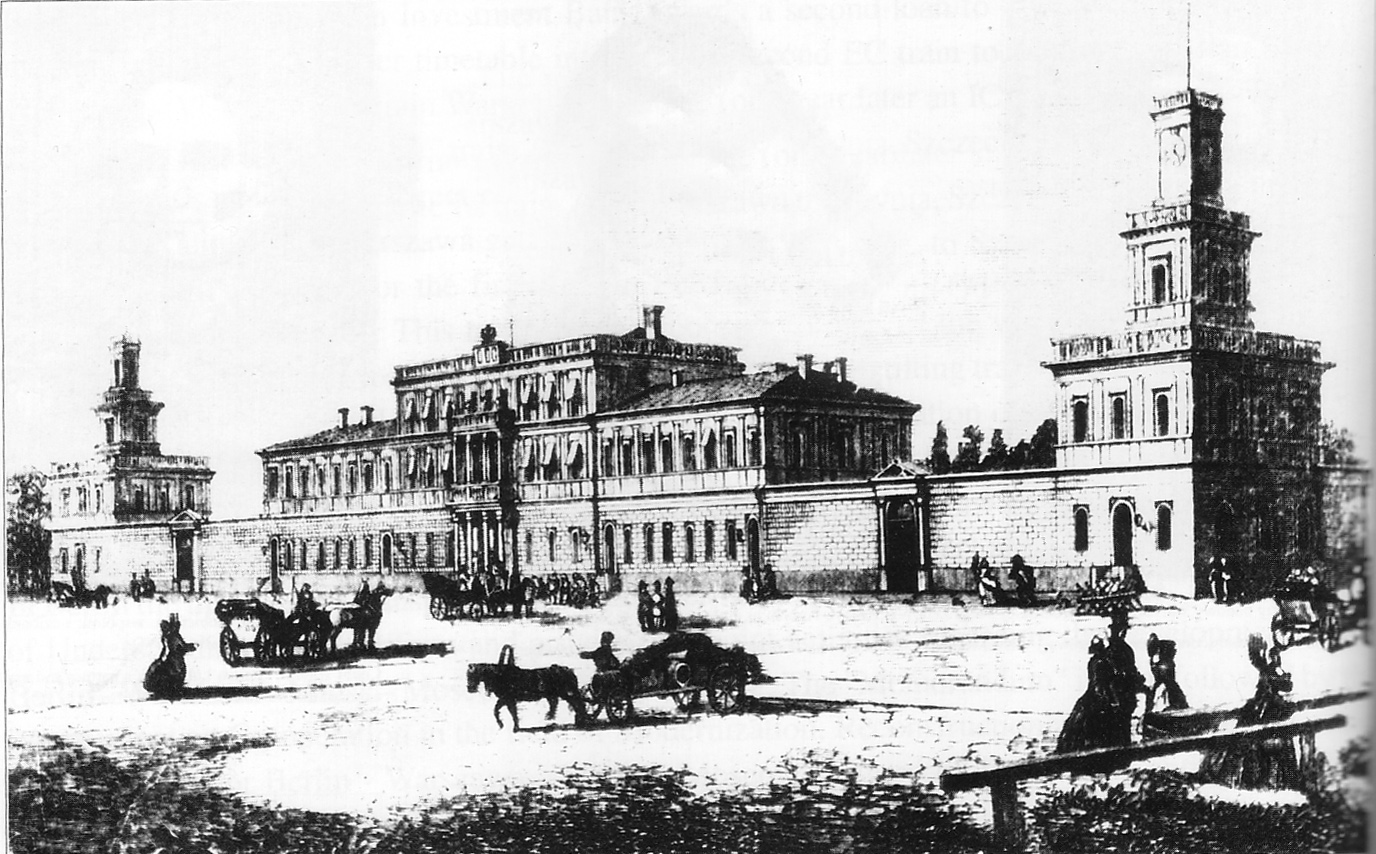
Vienna Station, Warsaw (destroyed)
