= Wola Chroberska =

- Village
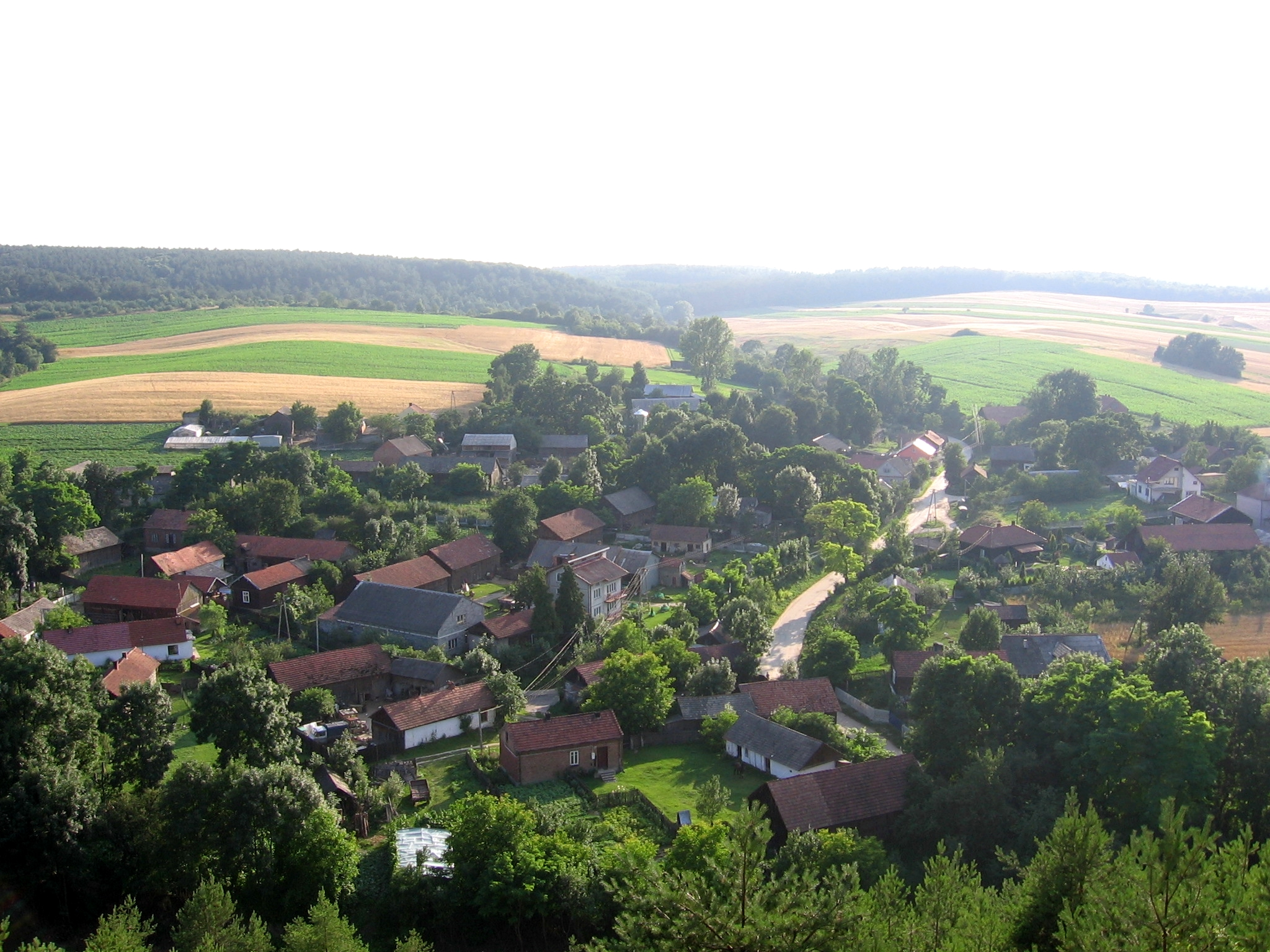

- Location within Poland
- Coordinates: 50°23′N 20°31′E
- Country: Poland
- Voivodeship: Świętokrzyskie
- County: Pińczów
- Gmina: Złota

Wola Chroberska [ˈvɔla xrɔˈbɛrska] is a village in the administrative district of Gmina Złota, within Pińczów County, Świętokrzyskie Voivodeship, in south-central Poland. It lies approximately 6 km (4 mi) west of Złota, 17 km (11 mi) south of Pińczów, and 56 km (35 mi) south of the regional capital Kielce.
