= Kostrzeszyn =

- Village
- Location within Poland
- Coordinates: 50°22′15″N 20°31′49″E
- Country: Poland
- Voivodeship / Province: Świętokrzyskie
- County: Pińczów
- Gmina / municipality: Złota
- Population: 261

Kostrzeszyn [kɔsˈtʂɛʂɨn] is a village in the administrative district of Gmina Złota, within Pińczów County, Świętokrzyskie Voivodeship, in south-central Poland. It lies approximately 5 km (3 mi) west of Złota, 19 km (12 mi) south of Pińczów, and 58 km (36 mi) south of the regional capital Kielce. Kostrzeszyn had a population of 261 according to the 2011 census.
