= Miernów =

- Village
- Location within Poland
- Coordinates: 50°20′21″N 20°35′2″E
- Country: Poland
- Voivodeship: Świętokrzyskie
- County: Pińczów
- Gmina: Złota
- Population (approx.): 330

Miernów [ˈmjɛrnuf] is a village in the administrative district of Gmina Złota, within Pińczów County, Świętokrzyskie Voivodeship, in south-central Poland. It lies approximately 5 km (3 mi) south of Złota, 22 km (14 mi) south of Pińczów, and 61 km (38 mi) south of the regional capital Kielce.
