= Biskupice, Pińczów County =

Biskupice
- Village
- Location within Poland
- Coordinates: 50°22′28″N 20°37′13″E
- Country: Poland
- Voivodeship: Świętokrzyskie
- County: Pińczów
- Gmina: Złota

Biskupice [biskuˈpit͡sɛ] is a village in the administrative district of Gmina Złota, within Pińczów County, Świętokrzyskie Voivodeship, in south-central Poland. It lies approximately 3 km (2 mi) east of Złota, 19 km (12 mi) south of Pińczów, and 57 km (35 mi) south of the regional capital Kielce.
