= Kolonie Pełczyskie =

Village in Gmina Złota, Poland

- Village
- Location within Poland
- Coordinates: 50°21′55″N 20°35′14″E
- Country: Poland
- Voivodeship: Świętokrzyskie
- County: Pińczów
- Gmina: Złota

Kolonie Pełczyskie [kɔˈlɔɲɛ pɛu̯ˈt͡ʂɨskʲɛ] is a village in the administrative district of Gmina Złota, within Pińczów County, Świętokrzyskie Voivodeship, in south-central Poland.
