= Górki Kostrzeszyńskie =

Village in Gmina Złota, Poland

- Village
- Location within Poland
- Coordinates: 50°22′53″N 20°30′44″E
- Country: Poland
- Voivodeship: Świętokrzyskie
- County: Pińczów
- Gmina: Złota

Górki Kostrzeszyńskie [ˈɡurki kɔstʂɛˈʂɨɲskʲɛ] is a village in the administrative district of Gmina Złota, within Pińczów County, Świętokrzyskie Voivodeship, in south-central Poland.
