= Adolf Dygasiński =

Polish novelist, publicist and educator

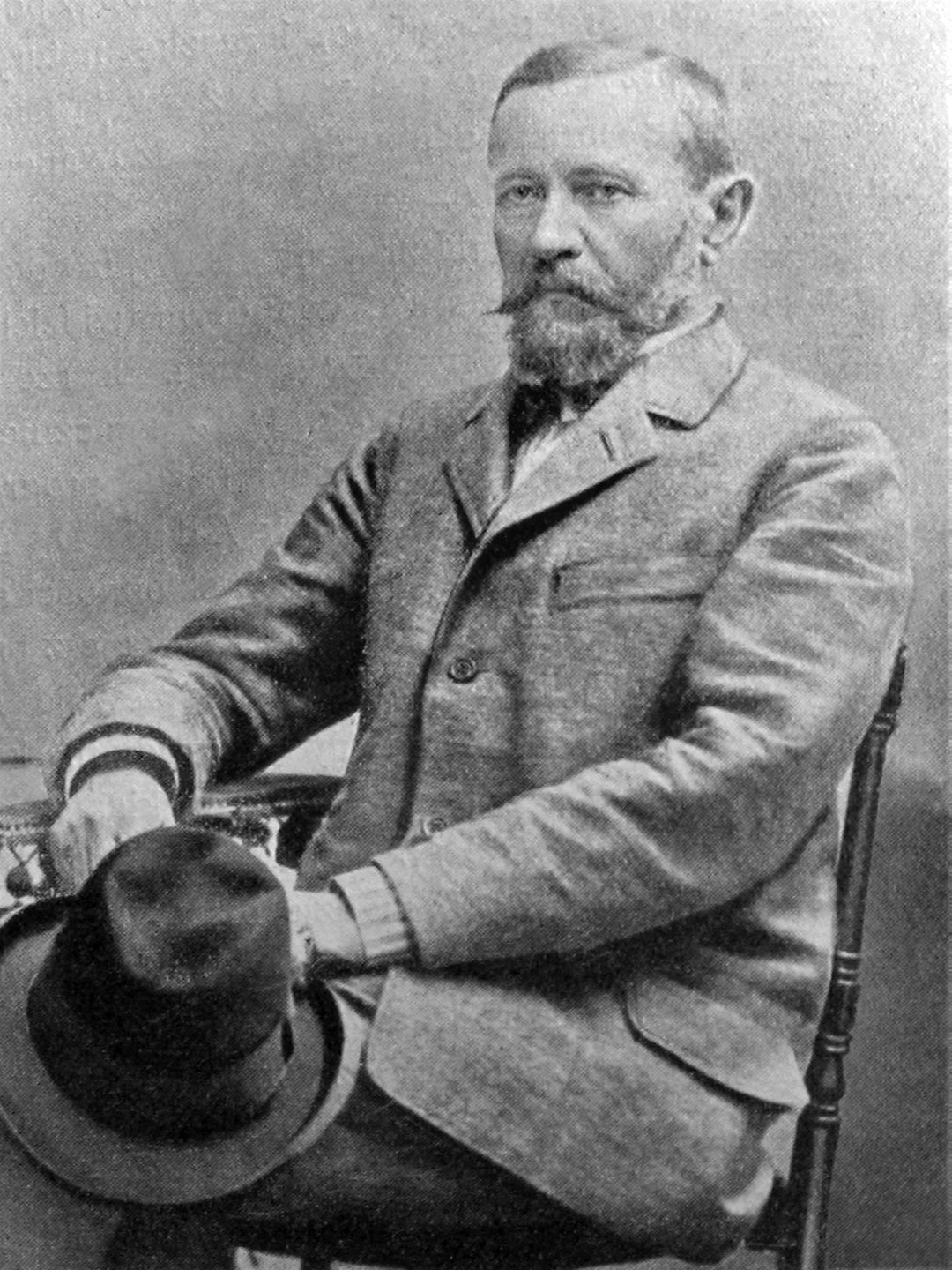
- Born: 7 March 1839; Niegosławice, Pińczów County
- Died: 3 June 1902 (aged 63); Grodzisk Mazowiecki, Warsaw
- Resting place: Powązkowski Cemetery
- Writing career
- Language: Polish
- Genre: Novel
- Literary movement: Naturalism

Adolf Dygasiński (March 7, 1839, Niegosławice – June 3, 1902, Grodzisk Mazowiecki) was a Polish novelist, publicist and educator. In Polish literature, he was one of the leading representatives of Naturalism.

== Life ==
During his literary career, Dygasiński wrote forty-two short stories and novels. Since 1884 his works were being published in book-form and enjoyed considerable success. They were translated into Russian and German. In 1891, Dygasiński went on a trip to Brazil on a trail of Polish emigrants from Partitioned Poland. He produced a series of letters describing the tragic fate of Polish émigrés in South America. In the following years Dygasiński maintained a position of a tutor and coach for numerous wealthy landowning families. Late in life he settled in Warsaw, where he died on June 6, 1902, and was buried at the local Powązkowski Cemetery.

== Works ==
In his work Dygasiński often focused on topics of rural life and residents of small towns, highlighting the common fate of both, human and animal communities. Some of his most important work include:

- Wilk, psy i ludzie (Wolf, dogs and humans; 1883)
- Ogólne zasady pedagogiki dotyczące wykształcenia umysłu, uczuć, moralności i religijności (General principles of teaching in the education of mind, emotions, morality, and religion; 1883)
- Na pańskim dworze (At the court of the Lord; 1884)
- Głód i miłość (Hunger and Love; 1885)
- Na warszawskim bruku (On the streets of Warsaw; 1886)
- Nowe tajemnice Warszawy (New secrets of Warsaw; Vol. 1-2, 1887)
- Właściciele (Owners; 1888)
- Beldonek (Beldonek; 1888)
- Jak się uczyć i jak uczyć innych (How to learn and how to teach others; 1889)
- Pan Jędrzej Piszczalski (Mr. Jędrzej Piszczalski; 1890)
- Na złamanie karku (At breakneck speed; 1893)
- Gorzałka (Booze; 1894)
- Żywot Beldonka (Beldonek's Life; 1898)
- As (As; 1896)
- Zając (Hare; 1900)
- Listy z Brazylii (Letters from Brazil; 1891)
- Margiela i Margielka (Margiela and Margielka; 1901)
- Gody życia (Mating Life; 1902)

== See also ==
- History of philosophy in Poland
- List of Poles
