= Wymysłów, Gmina Złota =

Wymysłów
- Village
- Location within Poland
- Coordinates: 50°21′28″N 20°35′44″E
- Country: Poland
- Voivodeship: Świętokrzyskie
- County: Pińczów
- Gmina: Złota

Wymysłów [vɨˈmɨswuf] is a village in the administrative district of Gmina Złota, within Pińczów County, Świętokrzyskie Voivodeship, in south-central Poland.
