= Dowspuda =

- Village
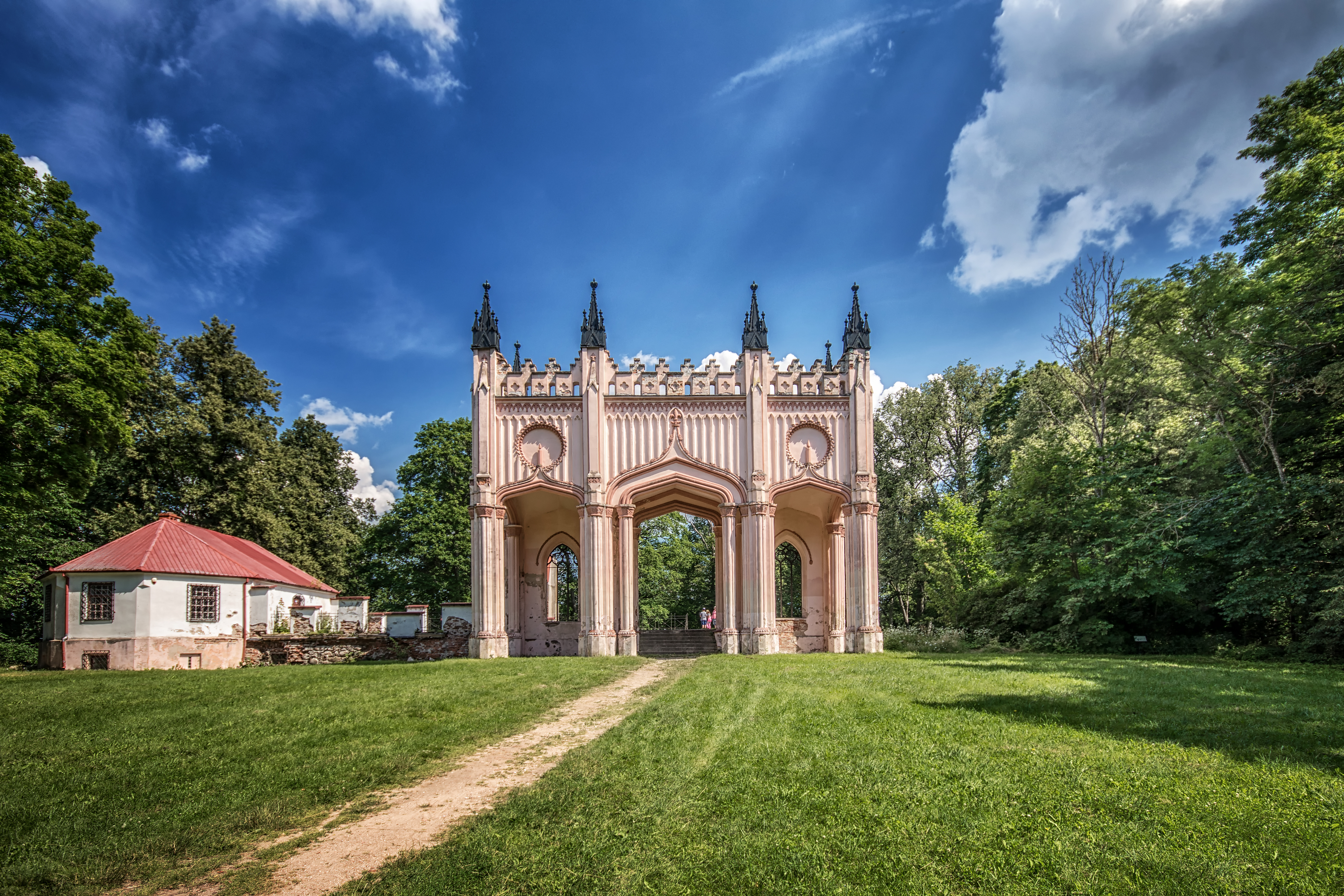

- Location within Poland
- Coordinates: 53°58′42″N 22°48′7″E
- Country: Poland
- Voivodeship: Podlaskie
- County: Suwałki
- Gmina: Raczki

Population
  - Total: 180

Dowspuda ([dɔfsˈpuda]) (Note: Lithuanian: Dauspuda) is a village in the administrative district of Gmina Raczki, within Suwałki County, Podlaskie Voivodeship, in north-eastern Poland.

The village is home to the remains of the 19th-century Pac Palace. In 1996–2004 and in 2007, the Celtic culture festival Dowspuda was held in the palace ruins.

== Etymology ==
One of the proposed etymologies for the village's name comes from the Jotvingian language Dau-spūda "to press hard, apply much pressure". The territory where Dowspuda is and the nearby Dowspuda River flows used to belong to Yotvingia.

== History ==
Historical affiliations of the town (including occupations during world wars)

Grand Duchy of Lithuania 1300s–1795
Kingdom of Prussia 1795–1807
Duchy of Warsaw 1807–1815
Congress Poland 1815–1867
Vistula Land 1867–1915
Ober Ost 1915–1919
Republic of Lithuania 1919 May – Aug.
Second Polish Republic 1919 Aug. – 1920 July
Lithuania 1920 July – Aug.
Poland 1920 Sept. – 1939 Sept.
Soviet Union 1939 Sept. – Oct.
Nazi Germany 1939 Oct. – 1944 Aug.
Polish People's Republic 1944–1989
Poland 1989–

From the 13th-14th centuries, the area formed part of the Grand Duchy of Lithuania, and then the Polish–Lithuanian Commonwealth. In the 18th century, it was a private possession of the Pac family.

Following the Third Partition of Poland in 1795, it became part of New East Prussia of the Kingdom of Prussia. From 1807, it was part of the short-lived Polish Duchy of Warsaw, within which it was located in the Łomża Department.

=== 1815–1835: Pac ===
After the duchy's dissolution, it was part of Russian-controlled Congress Poland from 1815.

==== Scottish settlers ====
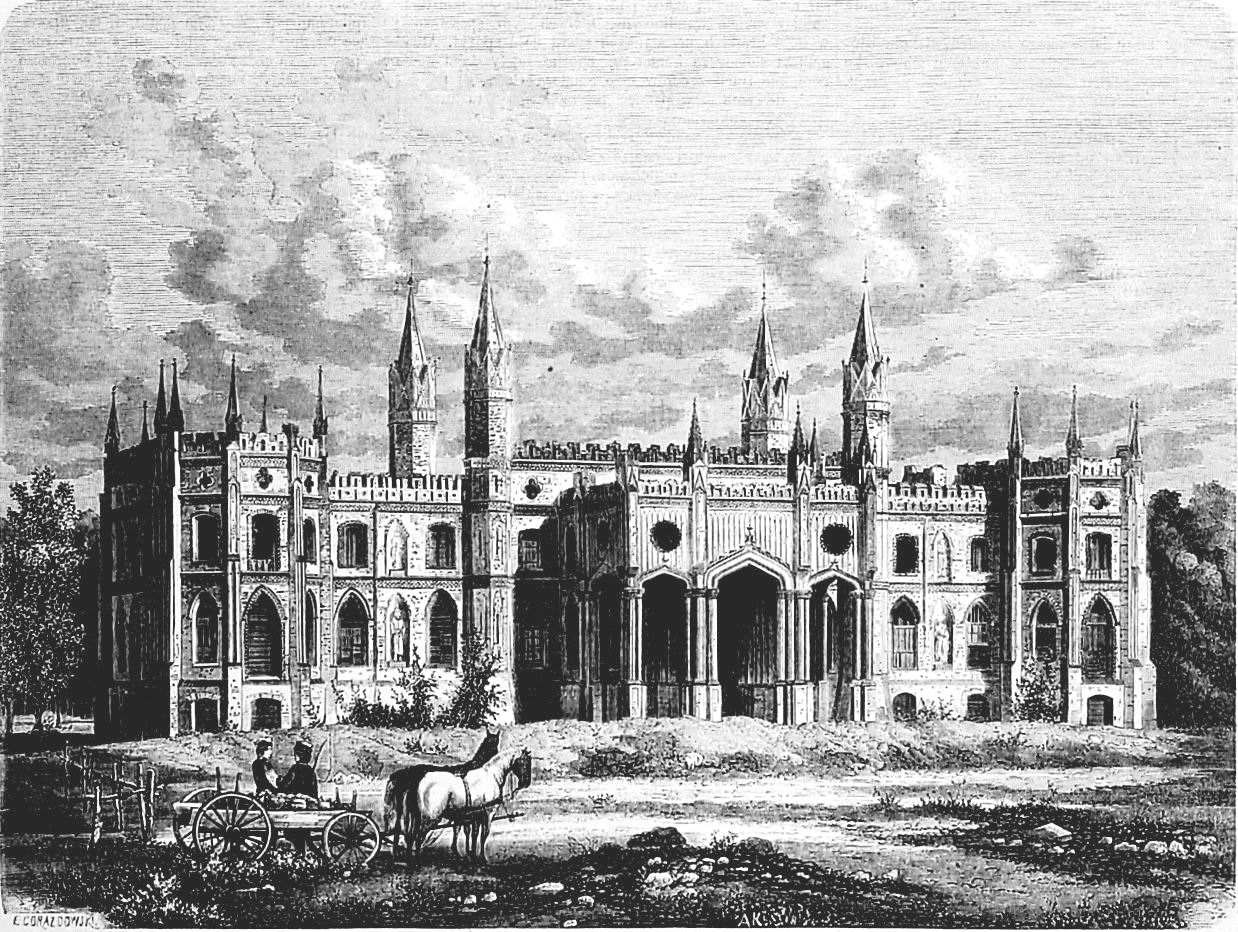
Pac Palace in the 19th century

Around 1815–1821, Ludwik Michał Pac invited about 500 people from Scotland to the village to teach locals modern agriculture and other crafts. The Scots founded a settlement called Szkocja and separate folwarks: Covenlock, New York (today Pruska Wielka), Longwood (Ludwinowo), Linton, Berwick (Korytki) and Bromfield (Józefowo). The Scots taught the local population how to switch from the three-field system to crop rotation, encouraged the cultivation of potatoes and keeping them in mounds, as well as horse and sheep breeding. In 1816, under the supervision of Scottish engineers, various facilities began to be built: horse mill, water wheel, seed drill, plows, threshers, sifters for flour and grits. A brewery, vodka distillery, tannery, starch factory, and oil press were also opened. It was the third such oil press in the country (previously, only one existed in Zwierzyniec, owned by Stanisław Zamoyski, and another on Antoni Trębicki's estate in Łomno). After Ludwik Pac's departure, many of the Scots who had come here also left, but some Scottish descendants remain in the village today.

In 1823, Polish General Ludwik Michał Pac built a grand residence in Dowspuda.

In 1835, the estate was confiscated by the Tsarist administration from the Pac family, as punishment for their support for the Polish–Lithuanian November Uprising.

=== 20th century ===
During World War I, Dowspuda was occupied by the German Empire. After the war, this area, as part of the Suwałki Region, was contested between Lithuania and Poland during the Polish–Lithuanian War and especially the Battle of Sejny in 1920. Thereafter, during the interwar period, the village belonged to the Second Polish Republic.

Following the German-Soviet invasion of Poland, which started World War II in September 1939, the village was first occupied by the Soviet Union's 15th Tank Corps. Soon thereafter, it was transferred it to Nazi Germany. One Polish citizen was murdered by Nazi Germany in the village during the war.
