= Szkocja, Podlaskie Voivodeship =

Szkocja
- Village
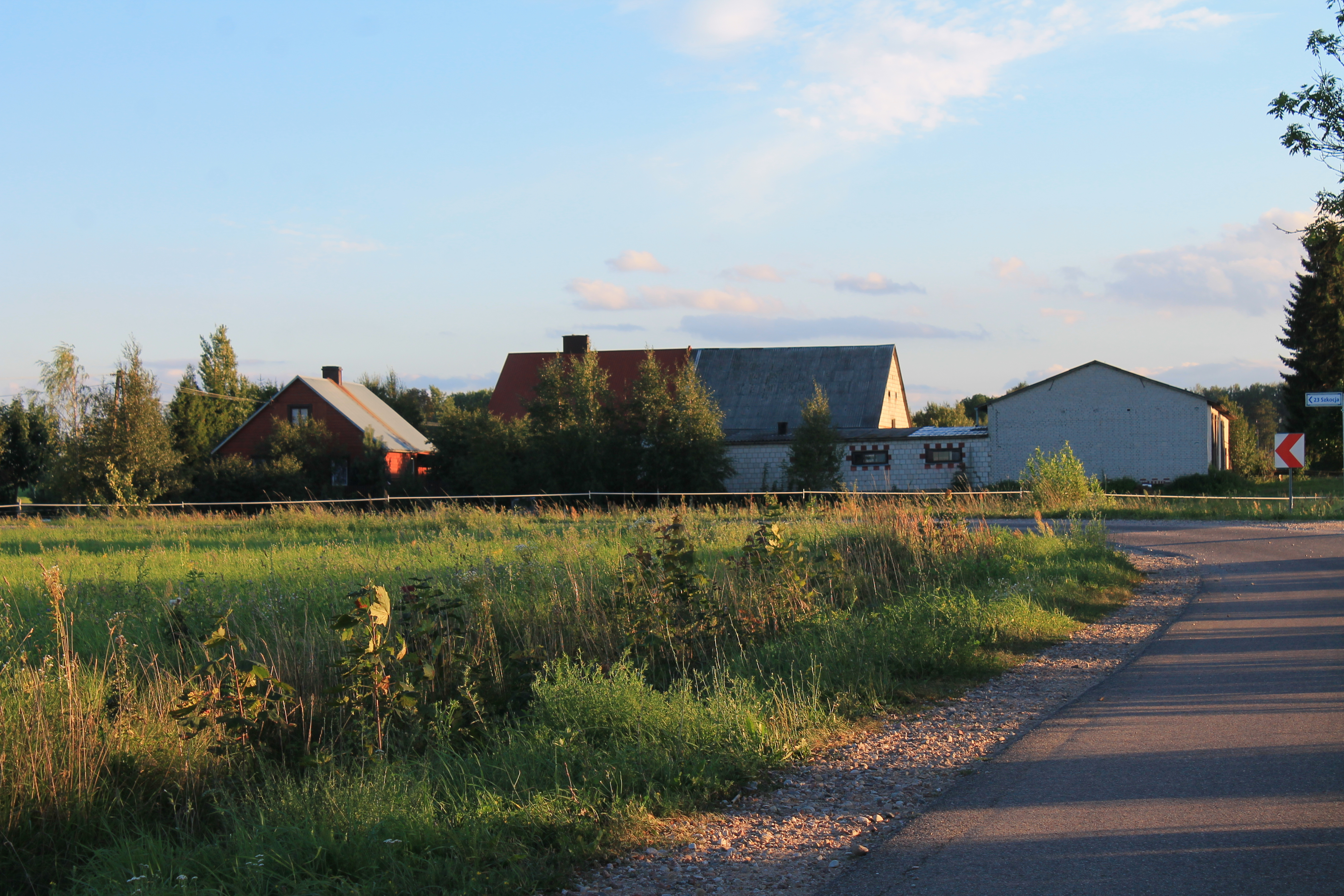

- Location within Poland
- Coordinates: 53°58′15″N 22°47′34″E
- Country: Poland
- Voivodeship: Podlaskie
- County: Suwałki
- Gmina: Raczki
- Established: 1823
- Founded by: Ludwik Michał Pac
- Named after: Scotland
- Time zone: UTC+1 (CET)
  - Summer (DST): UTC+2 (CEST)
- Vehicle registration: BSU

Szkocja [ˈʂkɔt͡sja] is a village in the administrative district of Gmina Raczki, within Suwałki County, Podlaskie Voivodeship, in north-eastern Poland.

The village was founded in 1823 by Count Ludwik Michał Pac, and named after its Scottish settlers, as the name means "Scotland" in Polish.

In the 1921 Polish census, the entire population declared Polish nationality.
