= Graby, Świętokrzyskie Voivodeship =

Graby
- Village
- Location within Poland
- Coordinates: 50°23′23″N 20°33′10″E
- Country: Poland
- Voivodeship: Świętokrzyskie
- County: Pińczów
- Gmina: Złota

Graby [ˈɡrabɨ] is a village in the administrative district of Gmina Złota, within Pińczów County, Świętokrzyskie Voivodeship, in south-central Poland.
