= Odrzywół, Świętokrzyskie Voivodeship =

Odrzywół
- Hamlet
- Location within Poland
- Coordinates: 50°23′N 20°32′E
- Country: Poland
- Voivodeship: Świętokrzyskie
- County: Pińczów
- Gmina: Złota

Odrzywół [ɔˈdʐɨvuu̯] is a hamlet in the administrative district of Gmina Złota, within Pińczów County, Świętokrzyskie Voivodeship, in south-central Poland. It lies approximately 5 km (3 mi) west of Złota, 17 km (11 mi) south of Pińczów, and 56 km (35 mi) south of the regional capital Kielce.
