= Młynek, Pińczów County =

Młynek
- Village
- Location within Poland
- Coordinates: 50°20′35″N 20°33′55″E
- Country: Poland
- Voivodeship: Świętokrzyskie
- County: Pińczów
- Gmina: Złota

Młynek [ˈmwɨnɛk] is a village in the administrative district of Gmina Złota, within Pińczów County, Świętokrzyskie Voivodeship, in south-central Poland.
