= Olbrych =

- Village
- Location within Poland
- Coordinates: 50°21′56″N 20°34′09″E
- Country: Poland
- Voivodeship: Świętokrzyskie
- County: Pińczów
- Gmina: Złota

Olbrych [ˈɔlbrɨx] is a village in the administrative district of Gmina Złota, within Pińczów County, Świętokrzyskie Voivodeship, in south-central Poland.
