= Gmina Złota =

Gmina Złota Złota Commune
- Gmina
- Coat of arms
- Interactive map of Gmina Złota
- Coordinates (Złota): 50°22′46″N 20°35′30″E
- Country: Poland
- Voivodeship: Świętokrzyskie
- County: Pińczów
- Seat: Złota

Area
  - Total: 81.7 km^{2} (31.5 sq mi)

Population (2006)
  - Total: 4,877
  - Density: 59.7/km^{2} (155/sq mi)
- Website: http://www.gminazlota.pl

Gmina Złota is a rural gmina (administrative district) in Pińczów County, Świętokrzyskie Voivodeship, in south-central Poland. Its seat is the village of Złota, which lies approximately 18 kilometres (11 mi) south of Pińczów and 56 km (35 mi) south of the regional capital Kielce.

The gmina covers an area of 81.7 square kilometres (31.5 sq mi), and as of 2006 its total population is 4,877.

The gmina contains parts of the protected areas called Kozubów Landscape Park and Nida Landscape Park.

== Villages ==
Gmina Złota contains the villages and settlements of Biskupice, Chroberz, Górki Kostrzeszyńskie, Graby, Kolonie Pełczyskie, Korce, Kostrzeszyn, Łobodzie, Lubowiec, Miernów, Młynek, Niegosławice, Nieprowice, Odrzywół, Olbrych, Pełczyska, Probołowice, Rudawa, Stawiszyce, Wojsławice, Wola Chroberska, Wymysłów, Żabiniec, Złota and Żurawniki.

== Neighbouring gminas ==
Gmina Złota is bordered by the gminas of Czarnocin, Pińczów and Wiślica.
