= Lubowiec =

- Village
- Location within Poland
- Coordinates: 50°22′27″N 20°33′41″E
- Country: Poland
- Voivodeship: Świętokrzyskie
- County: Pińczów
- Gmina: Złota

Lubowiec [luˈbɔvjɛt͡s] is a village in the administrative district of Gmina Złota, within Pińczów County, Świętokrzyskie Voivodeship, in south-central Poland.
