= Żabiniec, Świętokrzyskie Voivodeship =

Żabiniec
- Village
- Location within Poland
- Coordinates: 50°22′40″N 20°35′21″E
- Country: Poland
- Voivodeship: Świętokrzyskie
- County: Pińczów
- Gmina: Złota

Żabiniec [ʐaˈbiɲɛt͡s] is a village in the administrative district of Gmina Złota, within Pińczów County, Świętokrzyskie Voivodeship, in south-central Poland.
