= Chroberz =

- Village
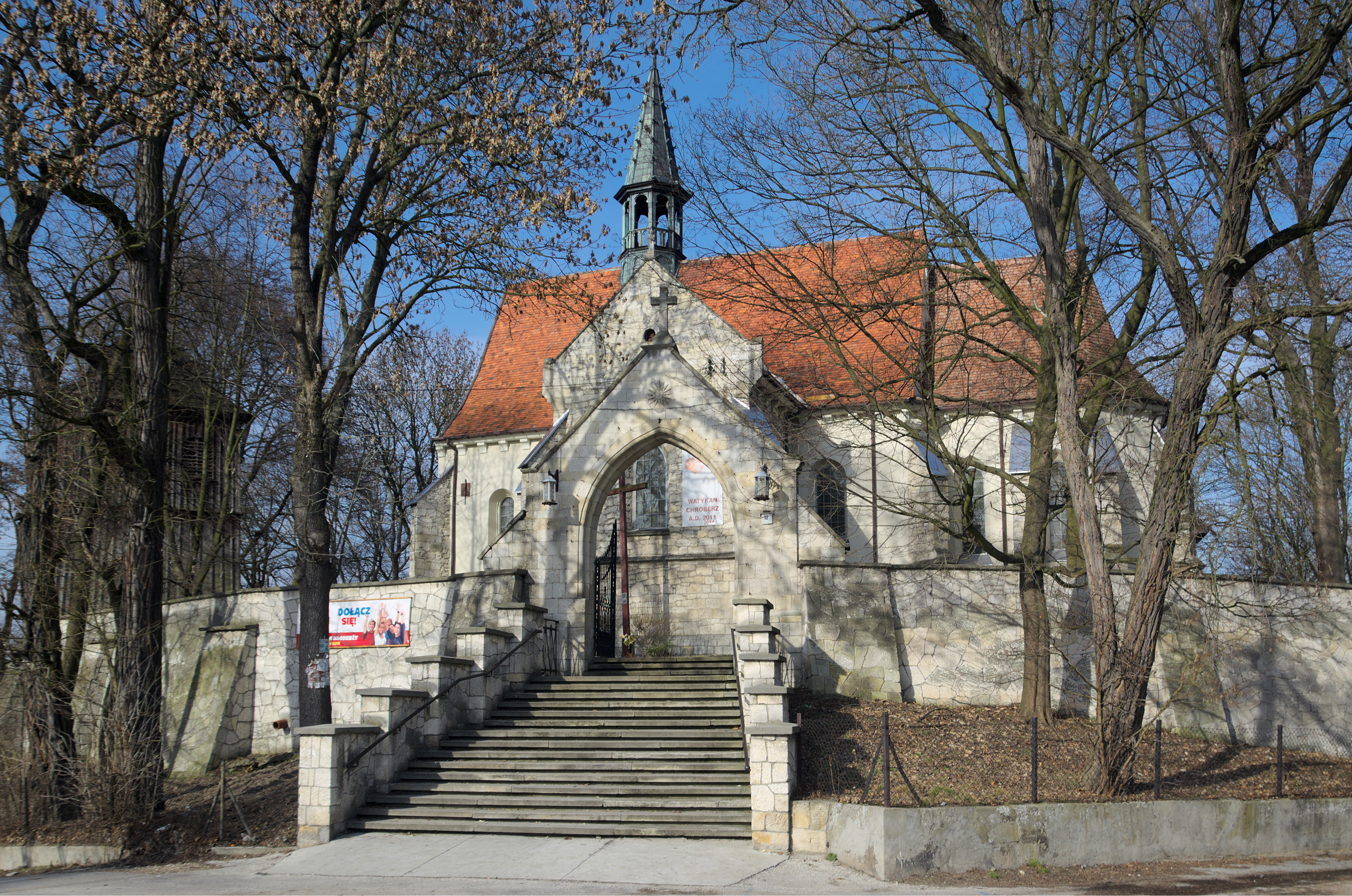
- Ascension of Virgin Mary Church

- Location within Poland
- Coordinates: 50°26′N 20°34′E
- Country: Poland
- Voivodeship: Świętokrzyskie
- County: Pińczów
- Gmina: Złota
- Settled: ca. mid-12th century

Government
  - Sołtys: Jan Bogdan
- Area: 9.24 km^{2} (3.57 sq mi)
- Population (2005): 964
  - Density: 104/km^{2} (270/sq mi)
- Total pop. ranked 1st in gmina
- Time zone: UTC+1 (CET)
  - Summer (DST): UTC+2 (CEST)
- Postal code: 28-425 Złota
- Area code: +48 41
- Car Plates: TPI
- Website: http://www.chroberz.info

Chroberz [ˈxrɔbɛʂ] is a village in the administrative district of Gmina Złota, within Pińczów County, Świętokrzyskie Voivodeship, in south-central Poland. It lies approximately 7 km (4 mi) north of Złota, 12 km (7 mi) south of Pińczów, and 51 km (32 mi) south of the regional capital Kielce.

== Etymology ==
The name Chroberz originates from Old Polish word "chrobry" which meant brave. According to the tradition, it refers to Bolesław Chrobry who built a castle and founded a parish in Chroberz.

== History ==
According to the chronicle of Marcin Kromer, in 1019 or 1020 Bolesław Chrobry, while returning from Kiev Expedition (1018), established a settlement in Chroberz. The first mention about town appears in an 1153 document Codex diplomaticus Poloniae, in which today's Chroberz is referred to as Chrober.

In the 13th century Chroberz seems to have been a place of some significance in the Kraków district. Two monarchs from Kraków – Leszek I the White and Bolesław V the Chaste stayed in Chroberz for some time during their reigns.
