= Łobodzie =

Village in Gmina Złota, Poland

- Village
- Location within Poland
- Coordinates: 50°22′09″N 20°36′47″E
- Country: Poland
- Voivodeship: Świętokrzyskie
- County: Pińczów
- Gmina: Złota

Łobodzie [wɔˈbɔd͡ʑɛ] is a village in the administrative district of Gmina Złota, within Pińczów County, Świętokrzyskie Voivodeship, in south-central Poland.
