= Ludwik Michał Pac =

France-born Polish general (1770–1835)

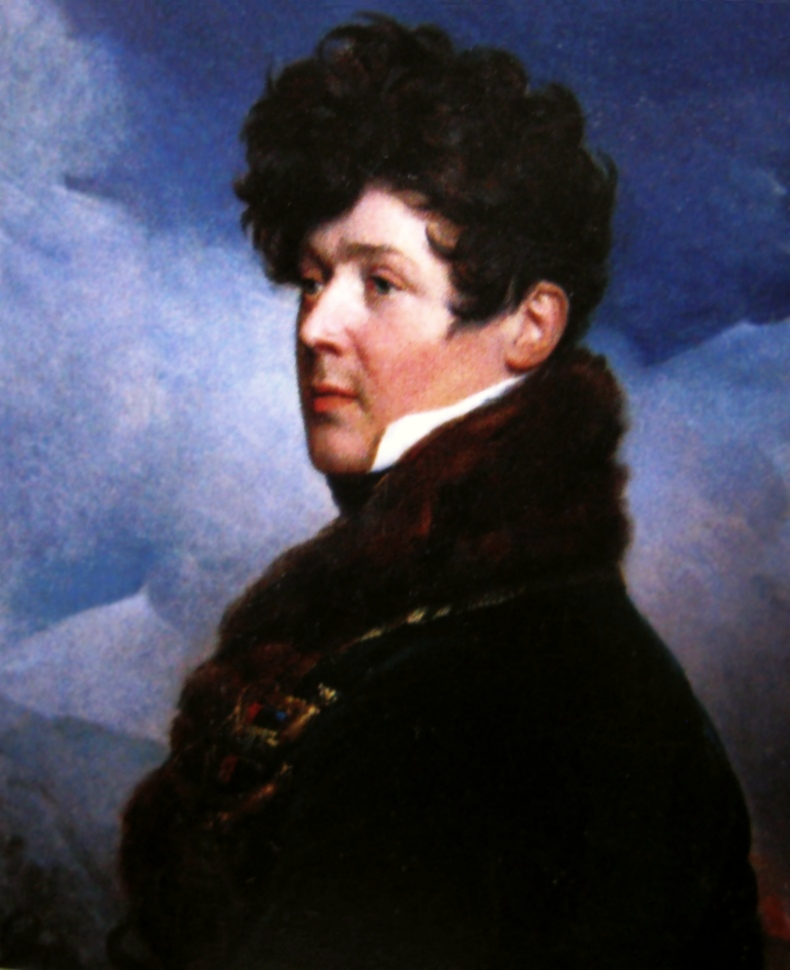
- portrait by François Gérard
- Coat of arms: Gozdawa
- Born: 5 March 1780; Strasbourg, France
- Died: 9 December 1835 (aged 55); Smyrna, Turkey
- Noble family: Pac
- Spouse: Karolina Malachowska
- Issue: Ludwina "Luisa" Pac-Malachowska
- Father: Michael Pac
- Mother: Ludwika Tyzenhauz

Count Ludwik Michał Pac (French: Louis Michel Pac; Lithuanian: Liudvikas Mykolas Pacas; 5 March or 19 May 1780 – 9 December 1835) was a France-born commander in the Grande Armée, the Army of the Duchy of Warsaw and the Uprising of 1831. Depending on the source, he is called Lithuanian or Polish. He was one of the last representatives of the noble Pac family.

== Early life ==
His parents were Michał Józef Pac and Ludwika Tyzenhauzówna. Ludwik Pac's parents married in 1775 in Utrecht and divorced in 1785. His mother remarried General Paweł Grabowski, who died in the Battle of Praga in 1794, while she died in 1791.

In his youth, Ludwik Michał studied in France until the French Revolution and he then studied in the United Kingdom. From 1796, Ludwik Pac studied at the Vilnius University. Already as a teenager, he already appeared on the lists of the infantry regiments of the Grand Ducal Lithuanian Army.

Józef Pac, who was Ludwik Pac's relative, died on 5 March 1796. So, Ludwik Pac inherited several estates, including that of Dowspuda, which was part of Užnemunė, the lands of the Grand Duchy of Lithuania that were annexed by the Kingdom of Prussia in 1795 during the Third Partition of Polish–Lithuania. He inherited also palaces in Vilnius and Grodno. From 1802 onwards, Ludwik Michał Pac began travelling throughout Europe. While in Paris, he frequented Anna Sapieha's salon and, in 1803, he left for London with her brother, Stanisław Zamoyski. Together, they visited England, Scotland and Ireland.

== Napoleonic Wars ==
=== War of the Fourth Coalition (1806–1807) ===
In 1806, Ludwik Michał Pac served as a volunteer, equipped at his own expense, in a Polish light cavalry squadron that was part of Napoleon's Imperial Guard. His estates, like the rest of Užnemunė, were occupied by the French after the Battle of Friedland during the War of the Fourth Coalition (1806–1807). Just before the negotiations for the Treaties of Tilsit began, a Lithuanian delegation, made up of Count Ludwik Pac, Count Józef Sierakowski and Count Tadeusz Tyszkiewicz, proposed to Napoleon that they would organize a Lithuanian revolt against the Russian Empire, on condition that France would help the insurgents, which Napoleon refused. The envoys left very depressed. In July 1807, the Treaties of Tilsit created the Duchy of Warsaw from the Lithuanian Užnemunė and the Polish lands taken from Prussia. Although many Lithuanians were disappointed by the only partial liberation of their country, thousands of them joined the ranks of the Army of the Duchy of Warsaw.

=== Napoleon's invasion of Spain (1808) ===
Pac was involved in Napoleon's invasion of Spain in 1808. During it, Pac distinguished himself militarily, demonstrating courage and military capability, while being the Chief of Staff of Marshal Jean-Baptiste Bessières' I Corps. For example, while commanding a squadron during the Battle of Medina de Rioseco, his horse was killed under him and he was wounded in the thigh by a bayonet thrust but he resumed the assault and pushed the enemy back. On 14 August 1808, Count Pac received the Knight's Cross of the Legion of Honour and was promoted to lieutenant colonel. On 28 August Pac was appointed squadron leader in the 1st Light Cavalry Lancers Regiment of the Imperial Guard.

=== War of the Fifth Coalition (1809) ===
After Spain, Pac fought in the War of the Fifth Coalition against the Austrian Empire in 1809. He fought at the Battle of Aspern-Essling and Wagram. During the latter battle, at the head of the 1st Polish Light Cavalry Regiment, whose colonel he now was, Pac charged Schwarzenberg's cavalry. After the war ended, Count Pac escorts Napoleon back to Paris.

=== 1809–1812 ===
However, Pac disillusioned with Napoleon after his duplicity concerning the Duchy of Warsaw, became indignant and sent his resignation to Napoleon on 19 October 1809, claiming problems of health. Pac went to Warsaw. Soon, Pac returned to military service, and commanded the Duchy's 2nd Lancer Regiment. Later, Pac regained his confidence in Napoleon and was appointed governor of the Duchy's Łomża Department, where he organized and equipped at his own expense a national guard of 3,000 men, which Pac commanded. Pac also organized a network of informants.

=== French invasion of Russia (1812) ===
During the French invasion of Russia, when the Grande Armée crossed the Nemunas on 24 June 1812, Count Pac rushed to Vilnius to receive the Emperor in the Pac Palace (today the Embassy of Poland in Vilnius). Napoleon, who appreciated this, invites him to dine with Berthier and Maret. On 14 July, during the celebration of the reunification of the two nations, Poland and Lithuania, at the Vilnius Cathedral, Count Pac is on Napoleon's left. In the evening, the count gives a grand ball in another of his palaces (now located at Didžioji Street 7) in which the civil and military authorities, both Lithuanian and French, partook. Prince Joachim Murat, King of Naples resided at the time in that palace. The Emperor himself makes an appearance there around 9 p.m. and talks with Count Pac and the local nobles. Thereafter, Napoleon attached the count to the imperial staff as aide-de-camp, with the rank of Général de brigade. Pac was with Napoleon during the Fire of Moscow and was wounded during the Battle of Berezina. At Smarhon', Napoleon leaves the Grande Armée on 5 December under the guard of Pac's uhlans to reach Paris as soon as possible due to the Malet coup of 1812.

=== War of the Sixth Coalition (1813–1814) ===
During the War of the Sixth Coalition, Pac fought in several battles. In the battles of Lützen and Leipzig, he commanded several Polish cavalry units. Distinguishing himself by his bravery and his efficiency in staff work, Pac was elevated to the rank of commander of the Legion of Honor on 24 October 1813. He was also made commander of the military order Virtuti Militari and Knight of the Order of Saint Stanislaus of the Duchy of Warsaw.

On 4 January 1814, Pac was given the task of reorganizing the Polish cavalry stationed in Reims. Pac was promoted to Général de division on 12 January 1814. As part of Marshal Michel Ney's army corps, Pac's regiments fought in the Campaign of France. In March, General Pac distinguished himself at the Battle of Berry-au-Bac where he defeated an enemy twice as numerous, taking nearly 300 men prisoner (including Prince Gagarin) and twice that number in horses. In the Battle of Craonne, under Ney's orders, Pac, commanding the Old Guard cavalry, resisted the enemy and stayed on the plateau, allowing Napoleon and his Imperial Guard to come rushing, thus deciding the success of the day. In the Battle of Laon, Pac was wounded in the hand and in the face, which did not prevent him from charging, taking hundreds of Russian prisoners. He succeeded in bringing Napoleon a 600-strong troop which he had re-equipped and organized in two months, recruiting even among the Polish prisoners of war, which Napoleon described as "superb".

On 30 March 1814, Count Pac, faithful to the French emperor till the very end, personally led a charge of four squadrons with his arm still in a sling on La Villette's plateau, in front Pantin's barrier. This was the last cavalry charge of the capital's defense during the Battle of Paris. He is the last to retreat, after Captain Zajączek had charged the Prussian guards with a light horse cavalry detachment. After the capture of Paris on 30 March, Count Pac withdrew to Le Mans.

The Grand Duke Konstantin Pavlovich of Russia order Count Pac to unite the Polish and Lithuanian troops in the plain of Saint-Denis. Pac replied on 15 April that he handed over the task to General Klicki, because of his inability to go in person due to his injury. Pac did not want to join neither the army of the new king of France, Louis XVIII, nor the Russian Emperor Alexander I of Russia. So, he demand the approval of his resignation from military service on 29 April "following an injury to be deprived of the use of the right hand", which was approved on 26 May. However, Pac was so inactive from then on, that the Minister of War was concerned about not knowing to whom to send his half-pay.

== 1815–1830 ==
In 1815, he travelled to Congress Poland. His main peacetime occupation was farming in his estates. During this time, he also transferred most of the peasant serfs from corvée to quit-rent. He also settled his estates with eighty Scottish families.

Since 1825, Pac was a senator of the Congress Poland.

== Uprising of 1831 ==
During the uprising of 1831, Pac was a member of the Polish National Government. He commanded the reserve corps and was wounded in the battle of Ostrołęka on 26 May 1831. After the uprising was defeated by the Russian Empire, he emigrated to France.

== 1831–1835 ==
He was a member of the insurgent sejm in exile.

== Legacy ==
Pac's name figures in a plaque of the Strasbourg officers' mess called Generaux Strasbourgeois, with 1780 marked as his year of birth.

== Honours and awards ==
- Commander's Cross of the Virtuti Militari
- Order of St. Stanislaus, with great ribbon
- Commander of the Legion of Honour
- Military Cross (Bavaria)

== Sources ==
- Dutertre, Gilles (2012). "Ludwik Michał Pac, comte lituanien, palatin polonais, général de Napoléon" [Ludwik Michał Pac, Lithuanian count, Polish palatine, general of Napoleon] (PDF). Cahiers Lituaniens (in French). 11.
- Straszewicz, Joseph (1832). Les Polonais et les Polonaises de la révolution du 29 novembre 1830 ou Portraits des personnes qui ont figuré dans la dernière guerre de l'indépendance polonaise (in French). Paris: Imprimerie et Fonderie de A. Pinard.
