= Złota, Pińczów County =

Złota
- Village
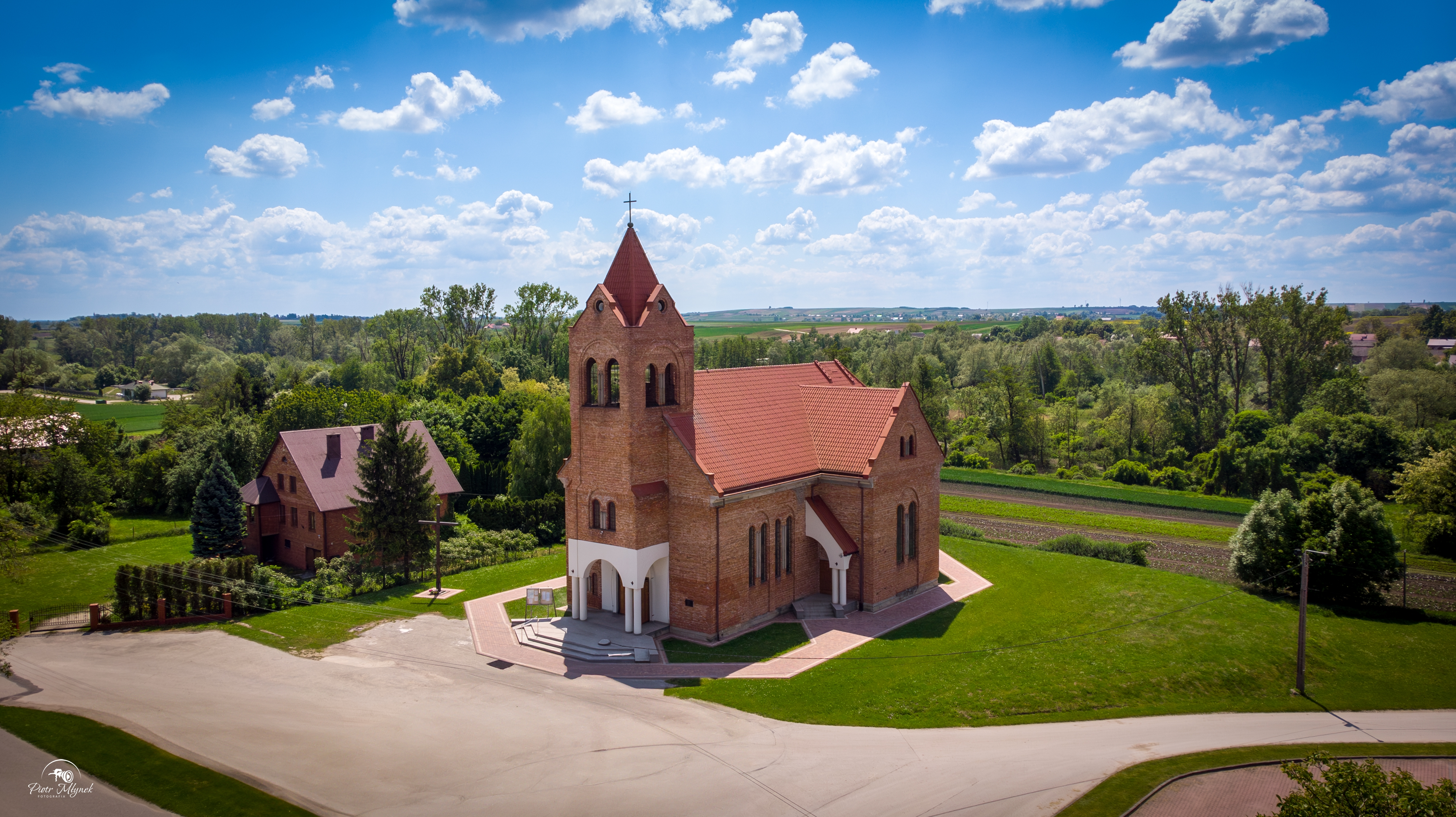
- Saint Ursula's Church

- Coat of arms

- Location within Poland
- Coordinates: 50°22′46″N 20°35′30″E
- Country: Poland
- Voivodeship: Świętokrzyskie
- County: Pińczów
- Gmina: Złota

Population (approx.)
  - Total: 960

Złota [ˈzwɔta] is a village in Pińczów County, Świętokrzyskie Voivodeship, in south-central Poland. It is the seat of the gmina (administrative district) called Gmina Złota. It lies approximately 18 km (11 mi) south of Pińczów and 56 km (35 mi) south of the regional capital Kielce.

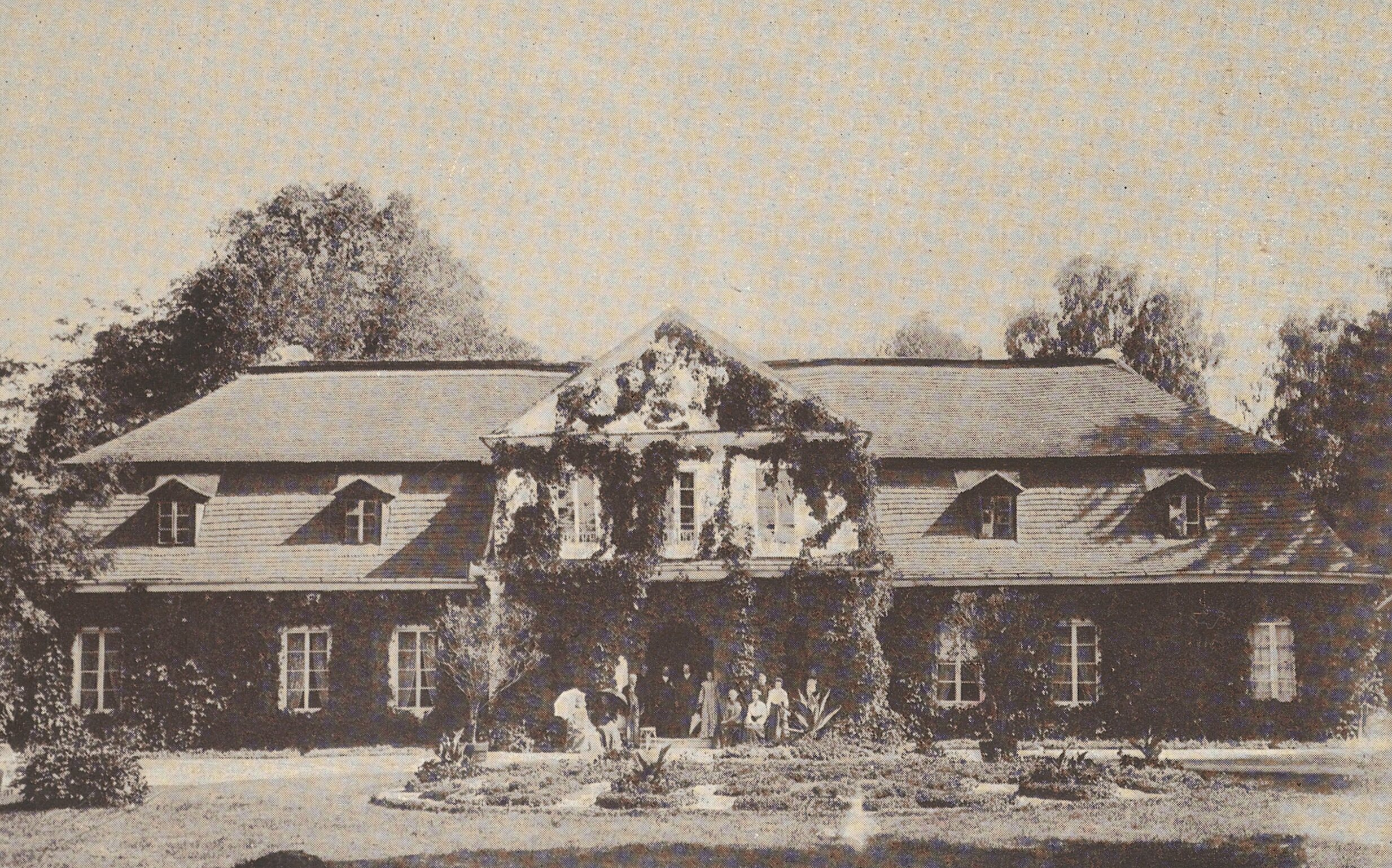
Manor house before 1911
