= Reformation in Italy =

Italian Reformation, 1520s, Italy

The Protestant Reformation began in 1520s in the Italian states, although forms of pre-Protestantism were already present before the 16th century (including the Waldensians, Arnoldists, Girolamo Savonarola, etc.). The Reformation in Italy collapsed quickly at the beginning of the 17th century. Its development was hindered by the Inquisition and also popular disdain.

== History of the Italian Reformation ==
=== Pre-Reformation Italy ===
During the 12th and 13th centuries a wide variety of religious dissidents appeared in Northwestern Italy and in Rome (like the patarini, the dulcinians, Arnaldo da Brescia); however, all were eliminated. Only one small group from the 12th century – Waldensians – was an exception. The Waldensians settled in inaccessible valleys of the western Alps where, thanks to their effective defence, they obtained a reduced freedom of faith (in 1561), after they had adhered to Reformation about 1532.

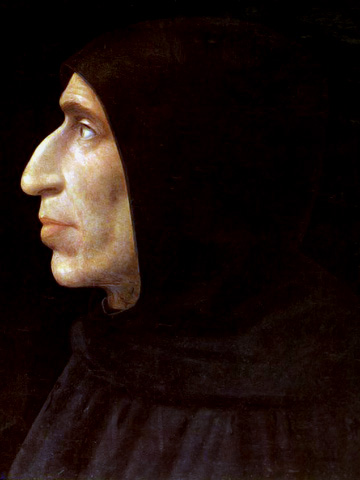
Girolamo Savonarola by Fra Bartolomeo, c. 1498, Museo di San Marco, Florence.

A Dominican friar, Girolamo Savonarola (1452–1498), is regarded as the predecessor of Martin Luther in Italy: he stigmatized the debauchery and abuses of the Catholic clergy, as well as demanding a "moral revival" and the destruction of statues and images at churches. However, in contrast with Luther, Savonarola did not gain the protection of influential patrons, and his action was of short duration. It was limited only to Florence, and soon Savonarola was hanged and burned. Savonarola's Florentine contemporaries Marsilio Ficino and Giovanni Pico della Mirandola attempted what has been termed a “Hermetic Reformation," but their Hermetic and Neoplatonic doctrines did not result in the emergence of a Protestant denomination.

Prof. Dr. Emidio Campi writes that the history of the Italian Reformation has been not yet thoroughly examined. Naples was one important centre of the Reformation. There, at the end of the 15th century, a so-called Spirituali circle was formed. It was concentrated around Spanish immigrant Juan de Valdés, who propagated Christian mysticism. In the 16th century, Venice and its possession Padua were temporarily places of refuge for Italian Protestants. These cities, along with Lucca, were important centres of the Italian Reformation because they were easily reached by new religious ideas spreading from the North. However, Protestantism there was quickly destroyed by the Inquisition. Italian Protestants fled mainly to German duchies and to Switzerland.

=== Basis of the Italian Reformation ===
Causes of the Italian Reformation were diverse: the precociousness of humanism, associated with the Italian revival; the rule of foreign powers (e.g. Spain in southern Italy, the Holy Roman Empire in the North), which were propagating other forms of Catholicism contrary to the Italian tradition; need of a deeper and more personal relation with God; a defence of Italian democratic and republican traditions against authoritarian monarchies in Spain and Germany; reaction to the ostentatious wealth and immoral conduct of the Catholic clergy, particularly Pope Alexander VI, who openly supported corruption and nepotism. The papacy was often accused (among others by Niccolò Machiavelli) of supporting the political division of Italy.

== Rise of Protestantism in Italy ==
=== Rise of Lutheranism ===
In the 1520s, soon after publication of the first letters of Martin Luther, the first few Italian Lutherans appeared (e.g. Pier Paolo Vergerio, Aonio Paleario). However, the effect of Lutheranism was minimal because Luther wrote in German and directed his mission mainly at Germans, and the Church censorship in Italy was very effective.

Bartolomeo Fonzio probably first translated Luther tract An den christlichen Adel into Italian. Later he was active promoter of Lutheranism in Italy, but in 1558 was sentenced to death and drowned. Other notable reformers were Baldo Lupetino of Albona in Istria and Baldassare Altieri of Aquila in Neapolitan territory.

All mentions of Lutheranism were immediately destroyed: in 1530 Antonio Bruccioli was expelled from Florence because he had cited works of Luther and Martin Bucer. Later he rendered the Reformation great service by elucidating and printing Biblical writings in the Italian language. He was repeatedly brought to trial, and died in prison in 1566. In 1531 Luther's theses were discussed at the University of Padua. It was the only known case of such an academic discussion in Italy.

=== Rise of Calvinism, Anabaptism, and Nontrinitarianism ===
Italian Protestants were among both the Magisterial and Radical reformers. Among them includes Pietro Martire Vermigli, Girolamo Zanchi, Lelio and Fausto Sozzini who acted mainly amongst higher social classes, frequently in princes' courts thus protecting themselves to some extent from the Inquisition. In 1550, Pope Julius III affirmed that 1,000 Venetians might be counted as belonging to the Anabaptist sect. Among them Giulio Gherlandi and Francesco dells Saga fell a sacrifice to the Venetian Inquisition in 1565.

About 1528 many French radical Protestants (among others Clément Marot and John Calvin) gathered around the prince Ercole d'Este in Ferrara, invited there by the prince's wife Renée – the daughter of the King Louis XII of France. For this reason the princess was accused by the Inquisition of heresy and came back to France after the death of her husband.

=== Revival of Waldensianism ===
Waldensianism was revitalized with the Protestant Reformation, and aligned itself to Calvinism by becoming a part of it.

== Causes of the Italian Reformation's collapse ==
The Italian Reformation collapsed after only about 70 years of existence because of the quick and energetic reaction of the Catholic Church. In the summer of 1542 the Italian Inquisition reorganized itself in order to fight Protestants in all Italian states more effectively.

Diarmaid MacCulloch states that Italy was less inclined to the ideals of the Reformation to begin with, and lack the anti-clerical sentiment that was present in other parts of Europe. He states that this might have been in part due to the heavy participation of the laity in the religious life (such as religious guilds, Confraternities and Oratories) which rendered the clerical monopoly on religion less strong.

As a result of this threat the majority of Italian reformers escaped to countries in Northern and Eastern Europe, such as Poland, where in Kraków the influential group of Italian Unitarians came into existence, supported unofficially by the Queen of Poland, the Italian-born Bona Sforza.

About 1600, almost all Protestantism practically ceased to exist in Italy, with Catholicism remaining the religion of the Italian states. An exception to this was the Waldensian movement, present since the 12th century. It was attacked in the Piedmontese Easter in 1655 and suffered long periods of persecutions in the Savoyard–Waldensian Wars (1655–1690) by the Catholic rulers of the Duchy of Savoy. The Waldensian Church still exists today and was offered an apology by Pope Francis.

In Italy the Catholic Church from its beginning effectively fought diverse heresies. Thus Italian religious reformers did not have a chance for wider activity and for propagating their views. Italian princes quickly stopped supporting the Reformation, because it could deprive them of profitable clergymen positions (like bishop or cardinal).

Another important cause of the Italian Reformation's collapse was the aggressive politics of the Holy Roman Empire toward Italian states. Italian princes identified the Reformation with this threat, and their belief was confirmed by, among other events, the Sack of Rome in 1527.

The first translation of the Bible into Italian language by Giovanni Diodati of Lucca was published in 1603, after the fall of the Reformation in Italy, and for this reason it only contributed to the development of Protestantism outside Italy, mainly in Italian-speaking cantons of Switzerland (Ticino and Grisons).

== Impact of the Italian Reformation ==
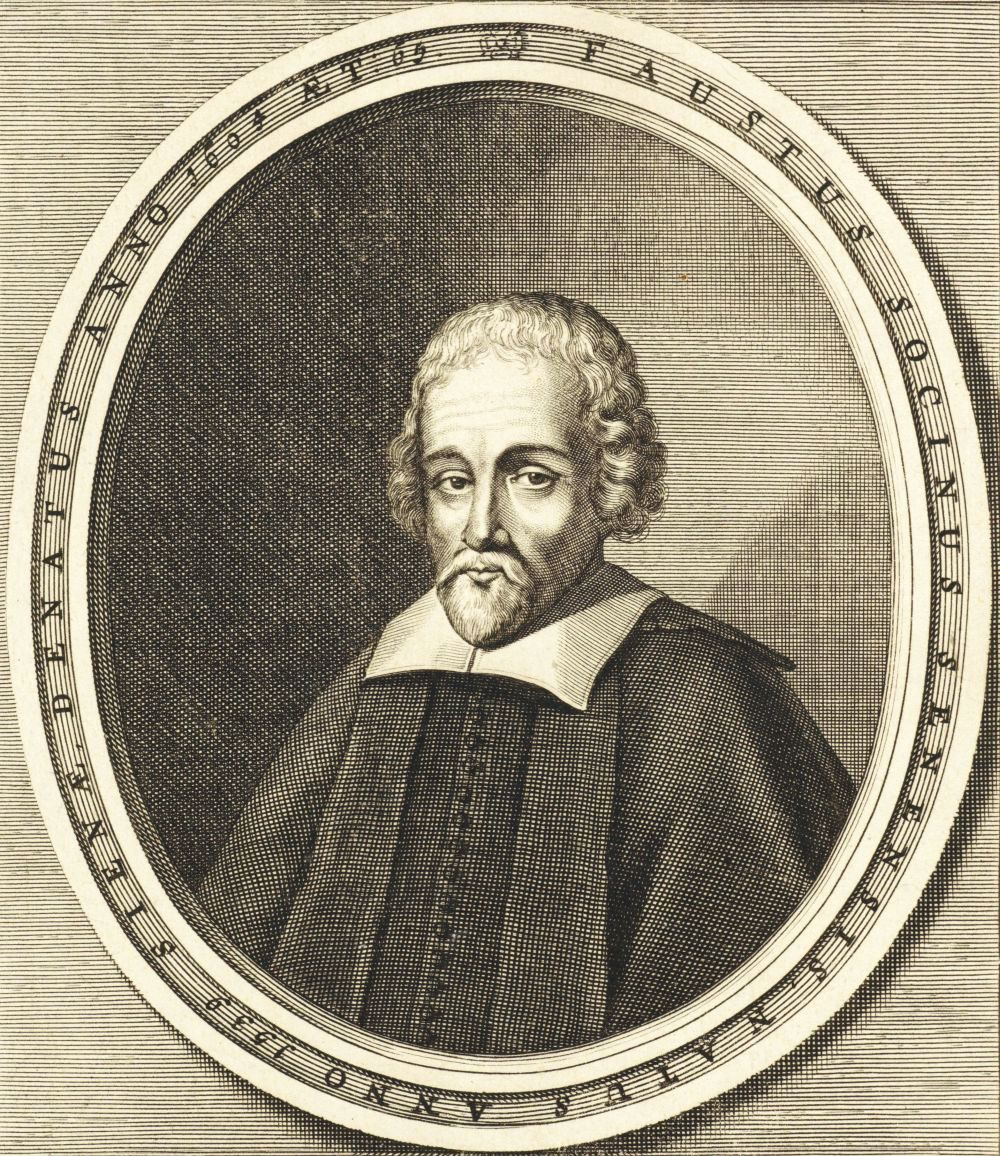
Fausto Sozzini, founder of Socinianism

In Italy the Reformation exerted almost no lasting influence, except for strengthening the Catholic Church, unlike the essential impact it had on other European countries (Switzerland, Germany, Bohemia, Hungary, and Transylvania among others). Many Italians were outstanding activists of the European Reformation, mainly in the Polish–Lithuanian Commonwealth (e.g. Giorgio Biandrata, Bernardino Ochino, Giovanni Alciato, Giovanni Battista Cetis, Fausto Sozzini, Francesco Stancaro and Giovanni Valentino Gentile) who propagated Nontrinitarianism there and were chief instigators of the movement of Polish Brethren.

=== Biblical Unitarian Movement ===
On the fringes of the Protestant Reformation there is the Biblical Unitarian Movement. Today, biblical Unitarianism (or "Biblical Unitarianism" or "biblical unitarianism") identifies the Christian belief that the Bible teaches God is a singular person—the Father—and that Jesus is a distinct being, his son. A few denominations use this term to describe themselves, clarifying the distinction between them and those churches which, from the late 19th century, evolved into modern British Unitarianism and, primarily in the United States, Unitarian Universalism.

== Italian Protestant Reformers ==
- Giovanni Diodati (Calvinist)
- Giovanni Valentino Gentile (Unitarian)
- Aonio Paleario
- Lelio Sozzini (Unitarian)
- Francesco Turrettini (Calvinist)
- Pier Paolo Vergerio
- Pietro Martire Vermigli (Calvinist)
- Girolamo Zanchi (Calvinist)

== Bibliography ==
- Caponetto, Salvatore. The Protestant Reformation in Sixteenth-Century Italy, Anne C. Tedeschi, John Tedeschi (transltr.), Thomas Jefferson University Press, Kirksville, 1999.
- Church, Frederic C. "The literature of the Italian reformation," Journal of Modern History (1931) 3#3 pp: 457-473 in JSTOR.
- Elton, G.R. ed. The New Cambridge Modern History, Vol. 2: The Reformation, 1520-1559 (1958) pp 251–74
- MacCulloch, Diarmaid. The Reformation (2005) pp 401–17
- Massimo Firp, "The Italian Reformation" in R. Po-Chia Hsia, ed.A Companion to the Reformation World (2008) pp 169–84.
