= Collegia Vicentina =

Series of meetings in Vicenza in 1546

The Collegia Vicentina consisted of a series of meetings in Vicenza in 1546. 40 Italian intellectuals met to re-evaluate the Christian Faith. Lelio Sozzini presided and only the Old and New Testaments were admitted as valid source material. They found that there was no scriptural evidence for the Holy Trinity, the union of two natures in Christ, Predestination or Original Sin. All Christians are equal and the Apostolic Church has no visible head. Because there is no original sin, there is no necessity for grace, therefore the Lord's Supper and baptism are not sacraments, but remembrances and confessions of faith. The source of life is the word, equated with Christ and linking with the Neo-Platonic theology of Marsilio Ficino.

The findings of the Collegia Vicentina formed the basis of Socinianism and also for the Anabaptist Council of Venice. Apart from Sozzini, attendees included Niccolò Paruta, Giorgio Biandrata, Giovanni Valentino Gentile, Gian Paolo Alciati, Bernardino Ochino, and Matteo Gribaldi.
