= Celso Sozzini =

Italian freethinker (1517–1570)

Celso Sozzini (1517–1570) was an Italian freethinker, brother of Alessandro (father of Fausto), Lelio, Cornelio, Dario, and Camillo.

Celso's father Mariano Sozzini il giovane (1482–1556) had eleven sons and two daughters. Alessandro, father of Fausto Sozzini, was the eldest but died young.

Celso first taught in Siena, and was founder of the short-lived Accademia del Sizienti (1554) of Bologna, of which young Fausto was a member.
