= Franciscus Junius (the elder) =

Huguenot theologian (1545–1602)

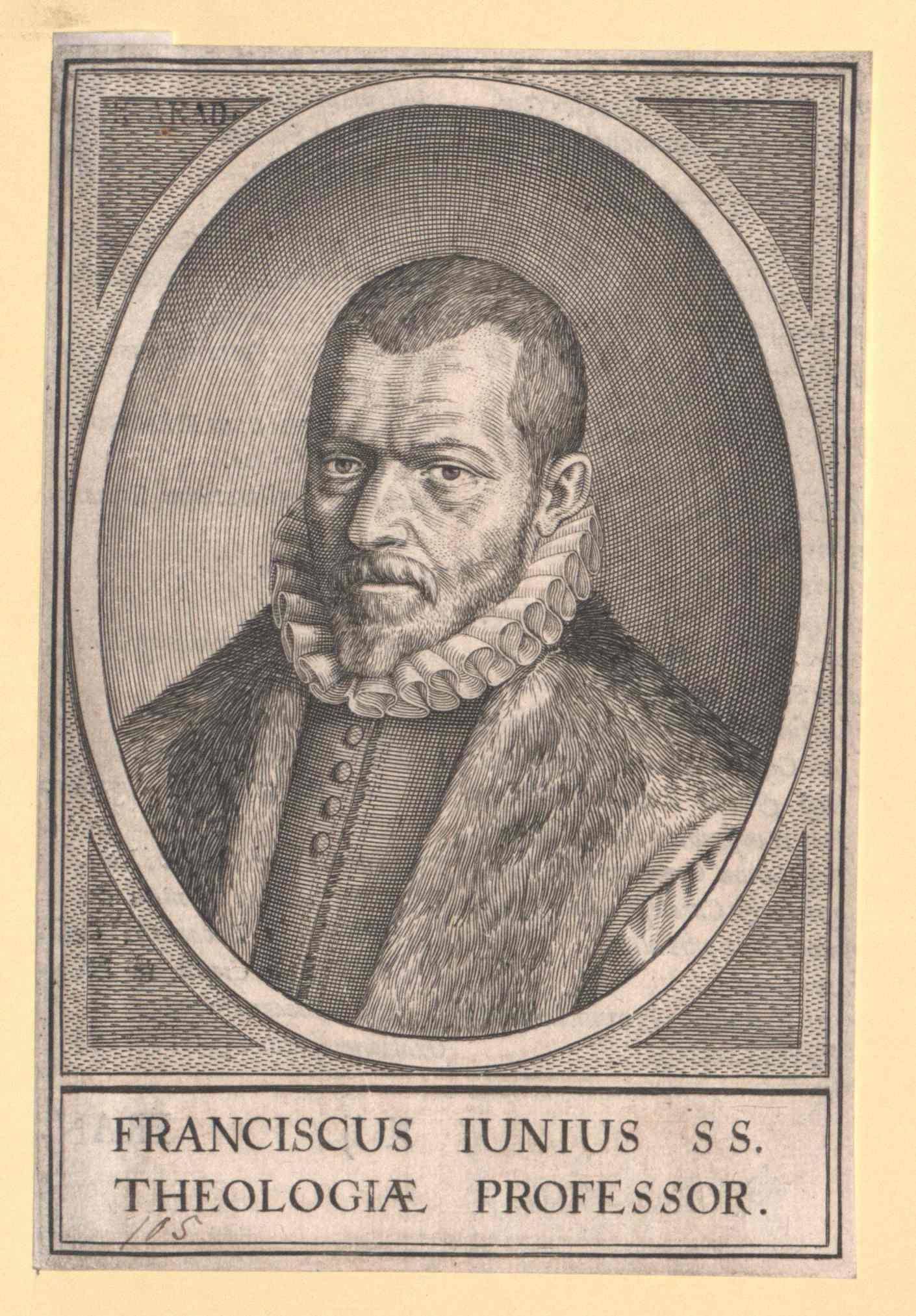

Franciscus Junius the Elder (born François du Jon, 1 May 1545 – 23 October 1602) was a Reformed scholar, Protestant reformer and theologian. Born in Bourges in central France, he initially studied law, but later decided to study theology in Geneva under John Calvin and Theodore Beza. He became a minister in Antwerp, but was forced to flee to Heidelberg in 1567. He wrote a translation of the Bible into Latin with Emmanuel Tremellius, and his Treatise on True Theology (De Vera Theologia) was an often used text in Reformed scholasticism.

== Life ==
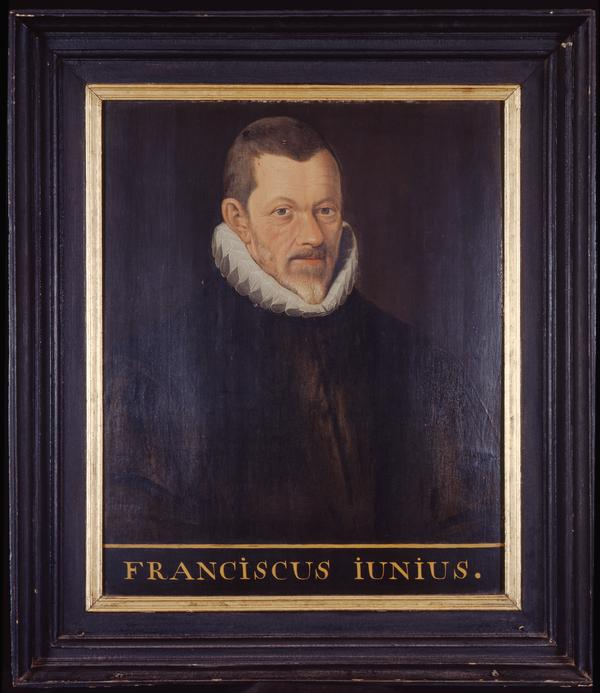
Junius (by Jacob Matham, ca. 1610)

Franciscus Junius was born on 1 May 1545 in Bourges, and beginning at age twelve studied law at the university there under François Douaren and Hugo Donellus. On account of his abilities in Greek and law, he was given the position of aide to the French ambassador at the court of Suleiman I in Constantinople, but before he reached Lyon, whence he was to travel by boat, the ambassador had departed.

Junius studied for two years at the gymnasium at Lyon, reading Greek and Roman classics. He nearly became an atheist while reading Cicero and Epicurus, but after reading the first chapter of John he was convinced to commit himself to God and he entered the French Reformed Church. He went in 1562 to study at Geneva under John Calvin and Theodore Beza, where he was reduced to poverty by the failure of remittances from home, owing to civil war in France. He would accept only the barest sustenance from a humble friend who had himself been a protégé of Junius's family at Bourges, and his health was permanently injured. The long-expected remittance from home was closely followed by the news of the brutal murder of his father by a Catholic fanatic at Issoudun; and Junius resolved to remain at Geneva, where his reputation enabled him to live by teaching. In 1565, however, he was appointed minister of the Walloon church at Antwerp. Junius was tasked with making a minor revision to the Belgic Confession, which was first prepared in 1561, and he also distributed it in Geneva in order to build consensus. In 1566, an iconoclastic uproar ensued in the Netherlands, but Junius did not take part. William the Silent made an agreement with Philip II of Spain in 1566 to protect Protestants, but only those who were natives of the Low Countries, placing Junius in danger. Several times he barely escaped arrest, and finally, after spending six months preaching in Limburg, he was forced to flee to Heidelberg in 1567. There he was welcomed by the elector Frederick II, and temporarily settled in charge of the Reformed church at Schönau; but in 1568 his patron sent him as chaplain with Prince William of Orange in his unfortunate expedition to the Netherlands. Junius returned to his church and remained there till 1573.

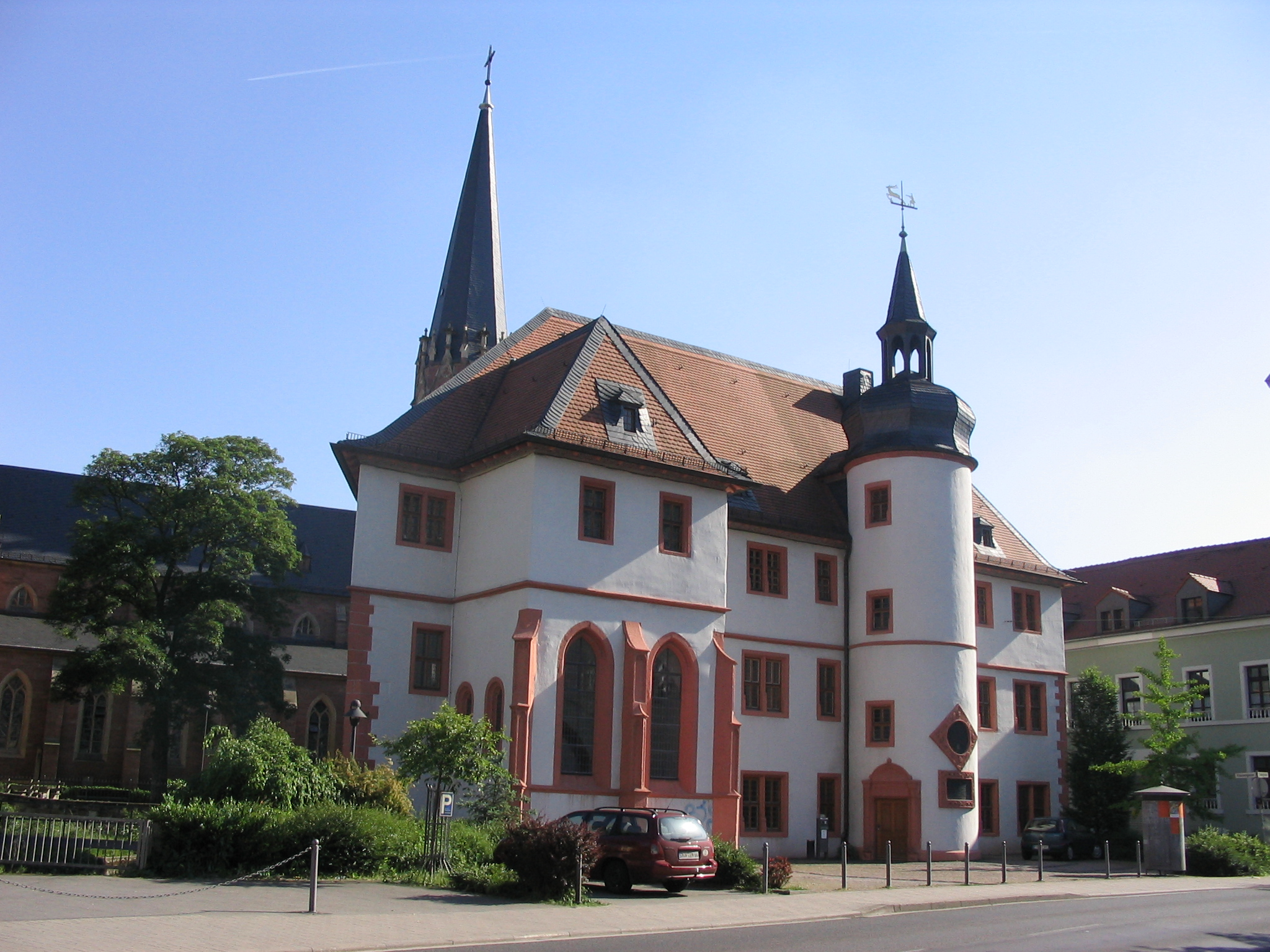
The Casimirianum Neustadt, where Junius taught from 1579–1583

From 1573 till 1578 he was at Heidelberg, assisting Emmanuel Tremellius, whose daughter he married; their child, also called Franciscus Junius, became an early scholar of Germanic philology. The Tremellius-Junius Bible, a distinctively Reformed Latin translation, was first published in 1579. It received thirty-three printings between 1579 and 1764 and was very influential on Reformed dogmatics, shaping Protestant theology into the late eighteenth century. The Tremellius-Junius Old Testament was often paired with Theodore Beza's translation of the New Testament. Frederick III was succeeded by Louis IV, a Lutheran, in 1576, and the Reformed in Heidelberg who refused to sign the Formula of Concord were forced out. In 1579, German prince and friend of the Reformed John Casimir formed the Casimirianum Neustadt. Junius, along with author of the Heidelberg Catechism Zacharias Ursinus, was one of the first faculty members. Junius became a friend of Ursinus, and delivered his funeral oration when he died in 1583. In 1583, John Casimir became regent, and Junius was invited back to become professor of theology at the University of Heidelberg.

From the late 1580s to 1592, Junius participated in diplomatic missions for the duke of Bouillon in France and Germany, which involved meeting personally with the king of France, Henry IV of Navarre. In 1592, he was named professor of theology at the University of Leiden. There he wrote his most famous work A Treatise on True Theology, De Vera Theologia, which became a cornerstone of Reformed scholastic theology. About the same time he also wrote The Mosaic Polity, De politiae Mosis observatione (1593), which addressed the contemporary political implications of the Mosaic Law. In this latter work, Junius analyzes the relationship between church and state and argues against the idea that humanism and scholasticism are necessarily antithetical. Junius examines the classification of the Mosaic laws as moral, ceremonial, and judicial, and argues that the ceremonial laws typically contain a "composite rationale from the moral, judicial, and ceremonial law." Upon his death in 1602, Junius was succeeded as chair of theology by Jacobus Arminius.

As to the date of his death, Latin scholar David C. Noe (of Calvin College) has identified a discrepancy in Abraham Kuyper's chronology in volume 1 of the Bibliotheca Reformata, D. Francisci Junii Opuscula Theologia Selecta, that lists October 26 as date of death. However, this is in fact the date when Franciscus Gomarus delivered the funeral oration at Leiden University. Gomarus notes two different dates for Junius's death: October 13 and October 20. Most research libraries, reference materials, and library catalog authority files list the date of death as October 13.

Upon his death Joseph Justus Scaliger wrote this lament:

Te moerens scola flet suum magistrum,
Orba ecclesia te suum parentem,
Doctorem gemit orbis universus.

"For you a wailing school her master mourns,
An orphan church weeps for you her father,
And for her doctor groans the whole wide world."
tr. David C. Noe, 2014.

== Works ==
- Defensio catholicae doctrinae de s. trinitate personarum in unitate essentiae Dei, adversus Samosatenicos errores. Heidelberg. 1590 [1584].
- Sacrorum Parallelorum. 1588. a commentary on each of the Old Testament passages referenced in the New Testament.
- De Politiae Mosis Observatione [The Mosaic Polity] (in Latin). Raphelengius. 1593.
- The Mosaic Polity. Christian's Library Press. 2015. ISBN 978-1942503101.

Academic offices
Unknown	Chair of theology at the University of Leiden; 1592–1602	Succeeded by Jacobus Arminius
