= Matteo Gribaldi =

Italian legal scholar

Matteo Gribaldi Mofa (c. 1505 in Chieri – September 1564, in Farges) was an Italian legal scholar who became an Arian and defender of Michael Servetus.

He was instrumental in the spread of antitrinitarianism to Poland through his Polish students in Italy including Piotr of Goniądz, and in Germany the pole Michał Zaleski, as well as on Italian exiles in Geneva who later traveled to Poland and Transylvania such as Giorgio Biandrata, Giovanni Paolo Alciati, and Giovanni Valentino Gentile. He wrote a popular educational work on the way to study law, reprinted many times: De methodo ac ratione studendi libri tres (Lugduni, apud A. Vincentium, 1541).

Lelio Sozzini lived with Matteo Gribaldi in Padua for two months during the autumn of 1553.
