= Jean Domat =

French jurist

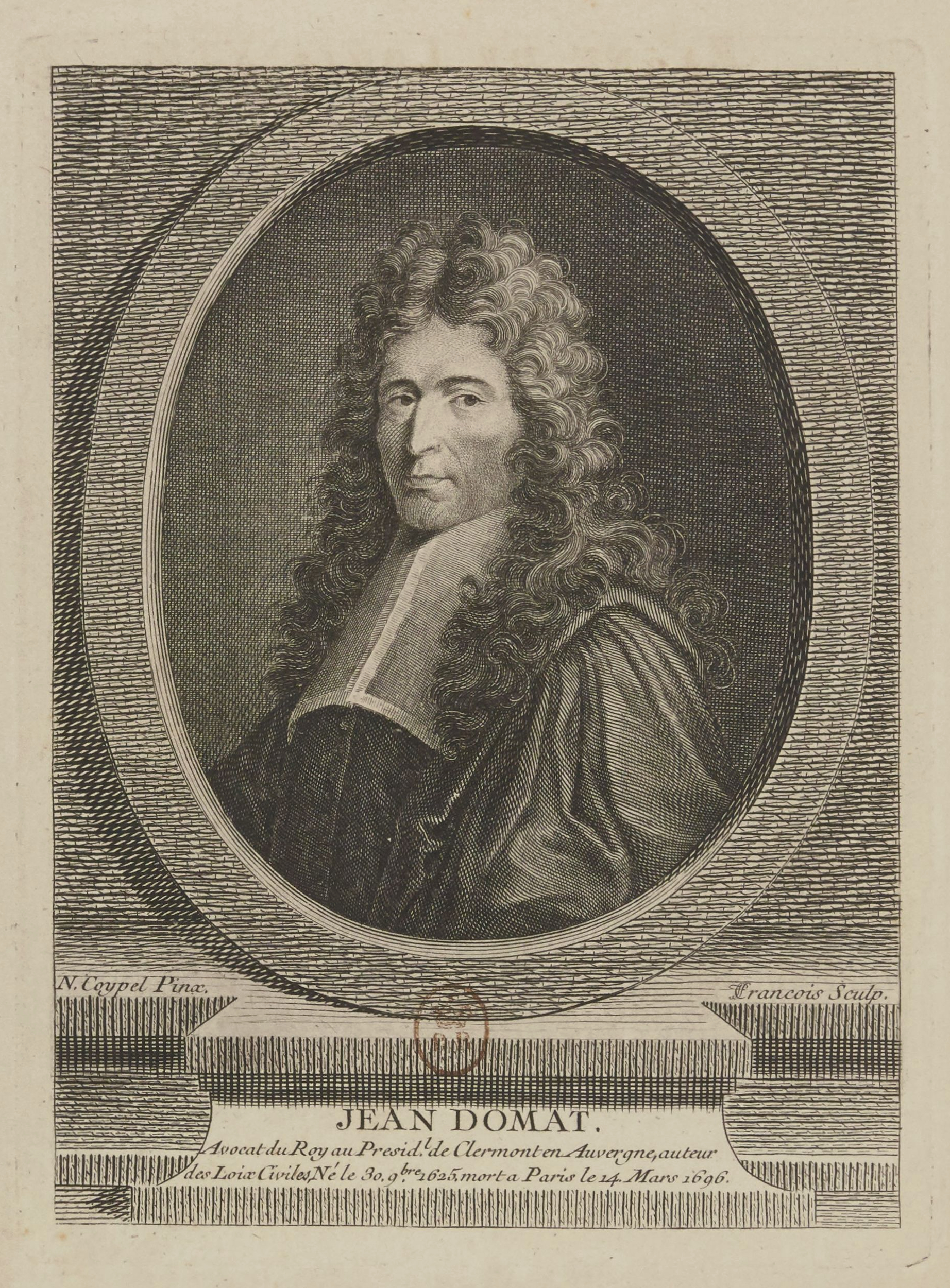
- Engraving of Domat after a painting by Noël Coypel
- Born: 30 November 1625; Clermont, France
- Died: 14 March 1696 (aged 70); Paris, France
- Education: Humanities, law
- Alma mater: University of Bourges
- Occupation: Jurist
- Notable work: Lois civiles dans leur ordre naturel and Le droit public

Jean Domat, or Daumat (30 November 1625 – 14 March 1696) was a French jurist.

== Life ==
Domat was born at Clermont in Auvergne. He studied the humaniora in Paris, where he befriended Blaise Pascal, and later law at the University of Bourges. Domat closely sympathized with the Port-Royalists, and on Pascal's death he was entrusted with the latter's private papers. After Domat's promotion in 1645, he practised law in Clermont and was appointed a crown prosecutor there in 1655. In 1683, he retired from this office with a pension from Louis XIV to concentrate on his scholarship.

== Principal work ==
Together with Antoine Dadin de Hauteserre, Antoine Favre and the Godefroy brothers, Domat was one of the few later French scholars of Roman law of international significance. He is principally known from his elaborate legal digest, in three quarto volumes, under the title of Lois civiles dans leur ordre naturel (1689, with 68 later editions), an undertaking for which Louis XIV settled on him a pension of 2,000 livres. A fourth volume, Le droit public, was published in 1697, a year after his death. After Hugo Doneau's more thorough but less consistent Commentarii iuris civilis (1589), the work was the first of this type of pan-European significance. It was to become one of the principal sources of the ancien droit on which the Napoleonic Code was later founded.

The title page of The Civil Law in Its Natural Order: Together with the Publick Law (1722), the first English edition of Domat's Lois civiles dans leur ordre naturel and Le droit public

Domat's work was in line with earlier Humanist attempts to transform the seemingly random historical sources of law into a rational system of rules. However, as a supporter of a Cartesian juridical order, Domat endeavoured to found all law upon ethical or religious principles, his motto being "L'homme est fait par Dieu et pour Dieu" ("Man was made by God and for God"). The work was thus an attempt to establish a system of French law on the basis of moral principles, and it presented the contents of the Corpus Juris Civilis in the form of a new system of natural law.

After the work of Robert Joseph Pothier, Domat's work is regarded as the second most important influence on the Civil Code of Lower Canada.

=== Editions ===
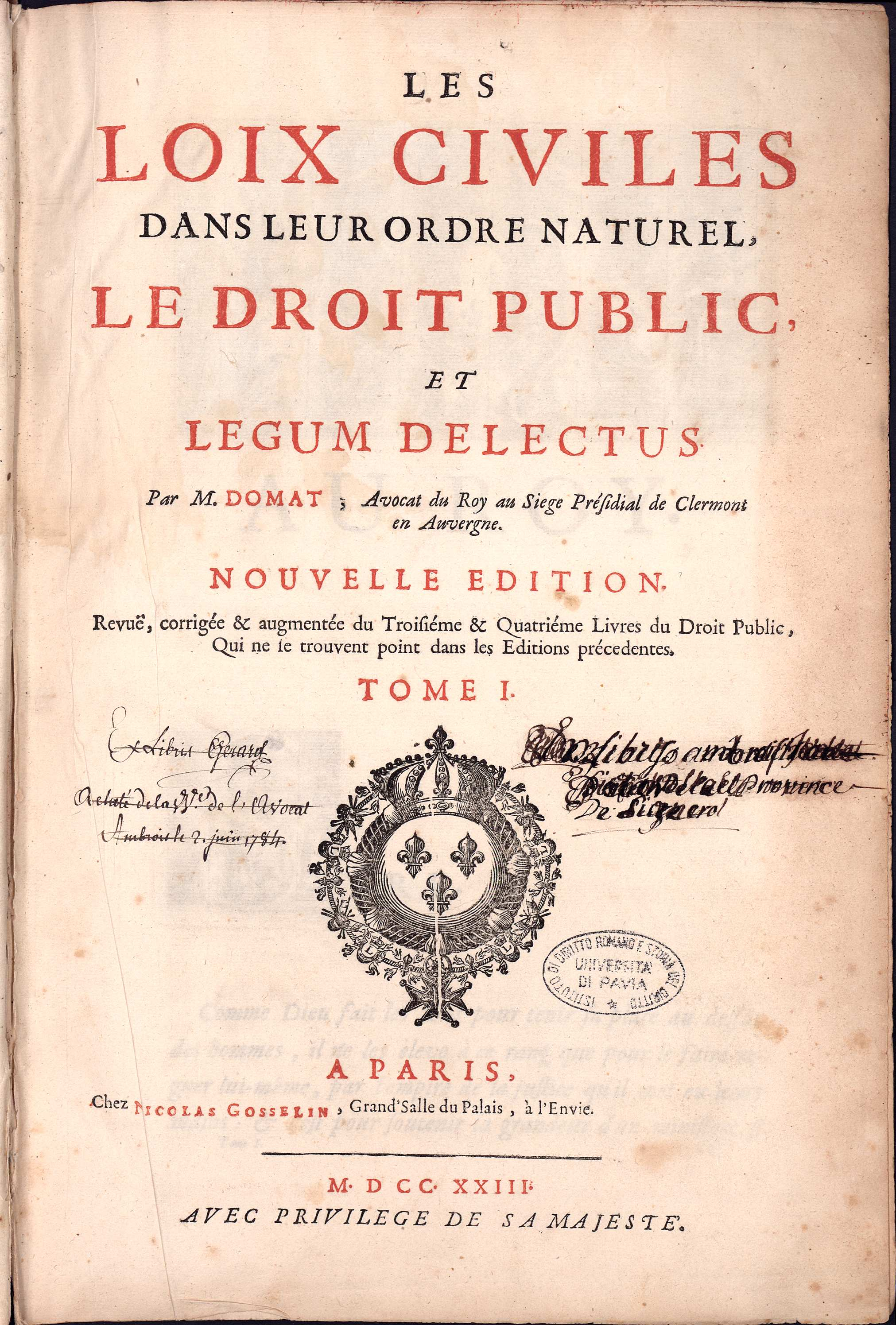
Le loix civiles dans leur ordre naturel, French edition, Paris 1723.

- Lois civiles dans leur ordre naturel, 1689
  - The Civil Law in Its Natural Order: Together with the Publick Law. Written in French by Monsieur Domat, The Late French King's Advocate in the Presidial Court of Clermont in France: and Translated into English by William Strahan, LL. D. Advocate in Doctors Commons. With Additional Remarks on Some Material Differences between the Civil Law and the Law of England. In Two Volumes. (1st English ed.), London: Printed by J. Bettenham, for E. Bell, J. Darby, A. Bettesworth, G. Strahan, F. Fayram, J. Pemberton, J. Hooke, C. Rivington, F. Clay, J. Batley, and E. Symon, 1722, OCLC 642758091
  - Loix civiles dans leur ordre naturel (in French). Paris: Nicolas Gosselin. 1723.
  - Les loix civiles dans leur ordre naturel. Le droit public, et legum delectus (in French). Paris: Chez la veuve Savoye, Libraire, rue S. Jacques. 1767 [1689].

== Later life ==
Besides the Lois civiles, Domat prepared, in Latin, a selection of the laws in the Digesta and the Codex Justinianeus under the title Legum delectus (Paris, 1700; Amsterdam, 1703); it was subsequently appended to the Lois civiles. Domat died in Paris on 14 March 1696.
