= Eguinaire Baron =

French jurist (1495–1550)

Eguinaire François, Baron de Kerlouan (1495–1550) was a French jurist. He is also variously referred to as Baro, Eguinaire Baron, Eguinarius Baro, Eguinarius Baron, Eguinar Baro or Eguin Baron.

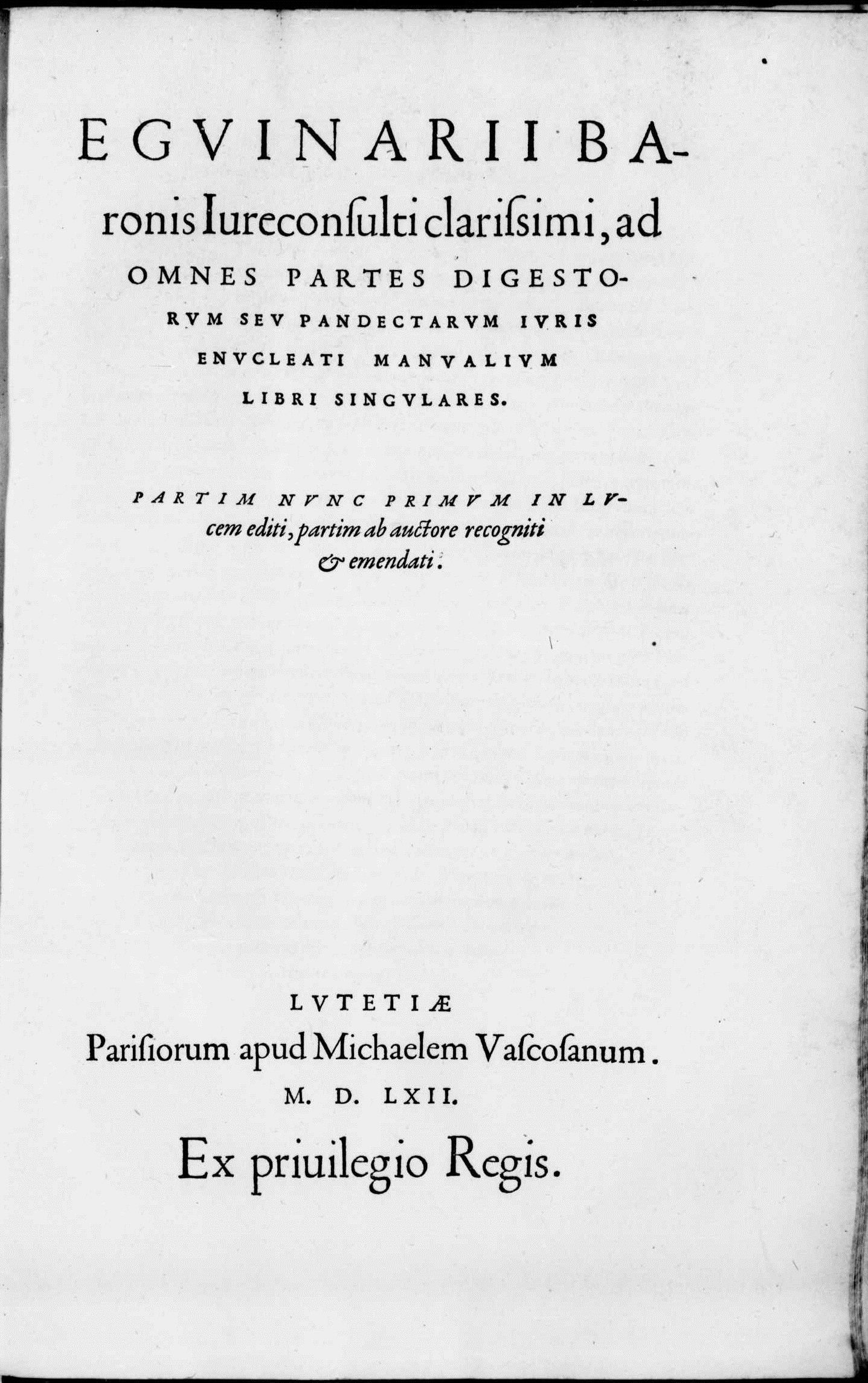
Ad omnes partes Digestorum seu Pandectarum iuris enucleati manualium libri singulares, 1562

Baro studied law in Poitiers, Paris, Orléans and Bourges, probably with Alciati. He taught Roman law in Angers after 1538 and in 1542, with Douaren, in Bourges.

Together with Budaeus, Alciati, Connan and others, Baro was among the founders of Humanist jurisprudence in France. He was the first to refer to the ius gallicum, French law, as such, and pioneered the use of paratitla, brief summaries of Pandects titles, in his Ad Digesta seu Pandectas Manualium libri septem. His other works include extensive commentaries and monographs on Roman and feudal law.

== Works ==
- Pandectarum juris civilis œconomia in adversariis miræ vetustatis apud Pictones inventa, Poitiers, Jean et Enguilbert de Marnef, 1535.
- Institutionum civilium ab Justiniano Cæsare editarum libri IV, bipartito commentario quam brevissime illustrati; cujus pars altera Romanum, altera Gallicum jus ad singulos titulos complectitur; ad illustriss. principem Navarr. reginam, 1546; Poitiers, Jean et Enguilbert de Marnef, 1555.
- Eguinarii Baronis jurisconsulti Variarum quæstionum publice tractatarum ad Digesta juris civilis I., de jurisdictione; cui accessit decretum ordinis juris professorum apud Bituriges de ordine, via & ratione interpretandi juris, Lyon, Sébastien Gryphe, 1548.
- Methodus ad Obertum Ortensium de beneficiis, in libros quattuor divisa : Tôn prôtôn, I; De acquirendo beneficio, II; De abalienando & amittendo vel contra, III; De judiciis ad beneficia pertinentibus, IV, Lyon, Sébastien Gryphe, 1549.
- Ad omnes partes Digestorum seu Pandectarum iuris enucleati manualium libri singulares (in Latin). Paris: Michel de Vascosan. 1562.
- De ratione docendi discendique juris civilis, 1552; Pisa, 1769–71.
