= Giovanni Valentino Gentile =

Italian humanist and non-trinitarian

Giovanni Valentino Gentile (c. 1520 in Scigliano – 10 September 1566 in Bern) was an Italian humanist and non-trinitarian.

As a young man he was influenced by Giorgio Siculo's teaching against paedobaptism and transubstantiation.

In 1546 he took part in the Collegia Vicentina in Vicenza, adopting the Unitarian view of Lelio Sozzini. After the 1550 Anabaptist Council of Venice antitrinitarians were persecuted by the Council of Ten and in 1557 Gentile fled with Apollonio Merenda to Geneva—already home to Giorgio Biandrata, Nicola Gallo, Giovanni Paolo Alciati and Matteo Gribaldi, and there, in 1558, he aligned with Alciati and Biandrata against Jean Calvin. On May 18, 1558, Calvin required all the Italian exiles in Geneva to affirm a Trinitarian statement, which Gentile first refused to sign, but then following the others, did so. At this period the Italian exiles in Geneva were forming the idea of Christ as a person subordinate to God, the Father, and of the Holy Spirit as simply God's power. In June Gentile and Nicola Gallo were denounced and tried for heresy and blasphemy by Calvin himself with the result that Gentile was sentenced to beheading.

Gary W. Jenkins calls Giorgio Biandrata the "tritheist apostle to the Poles", and suggests that Gentile was his Silas.
