= Massenzio =

Massenzio is a surname of Italian origin. Notable people with the surname include:

- Domenico Massenzio (1586–1657), Italian baroque composer
- Mike Massenzio (born 1982), American mixed martial artist
