= Camillo Sozzini =

Italian humanist and "heretic"

Camillo Sozzini (born c. 1520) was an Italian humanist and "heretic". He was the brother of Alessandro Sozzini, Lelio Sozzini, Cornelio Sozzini, and Dario Sozzini.
