= University of Bourges =

University in France

The University of Bourges (French: Université de Bourges) was a university located in Bourges, France. It was founded by Louis XI in 1463 and closed during the French Revolution.

Until the mid-17th century, lack of suitable legal training at home meant many Scots seeking to practice law studied at Bourges, Paris or Orléans; thereafter, most did so at Leyden University in the Dutch Republic.

== Notable alumni ==
- Patrick Adamson (1543–1591)
- John Calvin (1509–1564)
- Jean Domat (1625-1696)
- Hugues Doneau (1527–1591)
- Francois Douaren (1509–1559)
- Conrad Gessner (1516–1565)
- Franciscus Junius (the elder) (1545–1602)
- Esmé Stewart, 3rd Duke of Lennox (1579–1624)

== See also ==
- List of medieval universities

== Sources ==
- Houston, Robert A (2017). "Law & Literature in Scotland, c 1450 to 1707". In Hutson, Lorna (ed.). The Oxford Handbook of English Law and Literature, 1500-1700. OUP. ISBN 978-0199660889.
- J.-Y. Ribault, "L'Ancienne université de Bourges", in: Académie d'Orléans, Guide de l'étudiant, année 1964-1965, pp. 23–25.
