= Fausto Sozzini =

Italian theologian and co-founder of Socinianism (1539–1604)

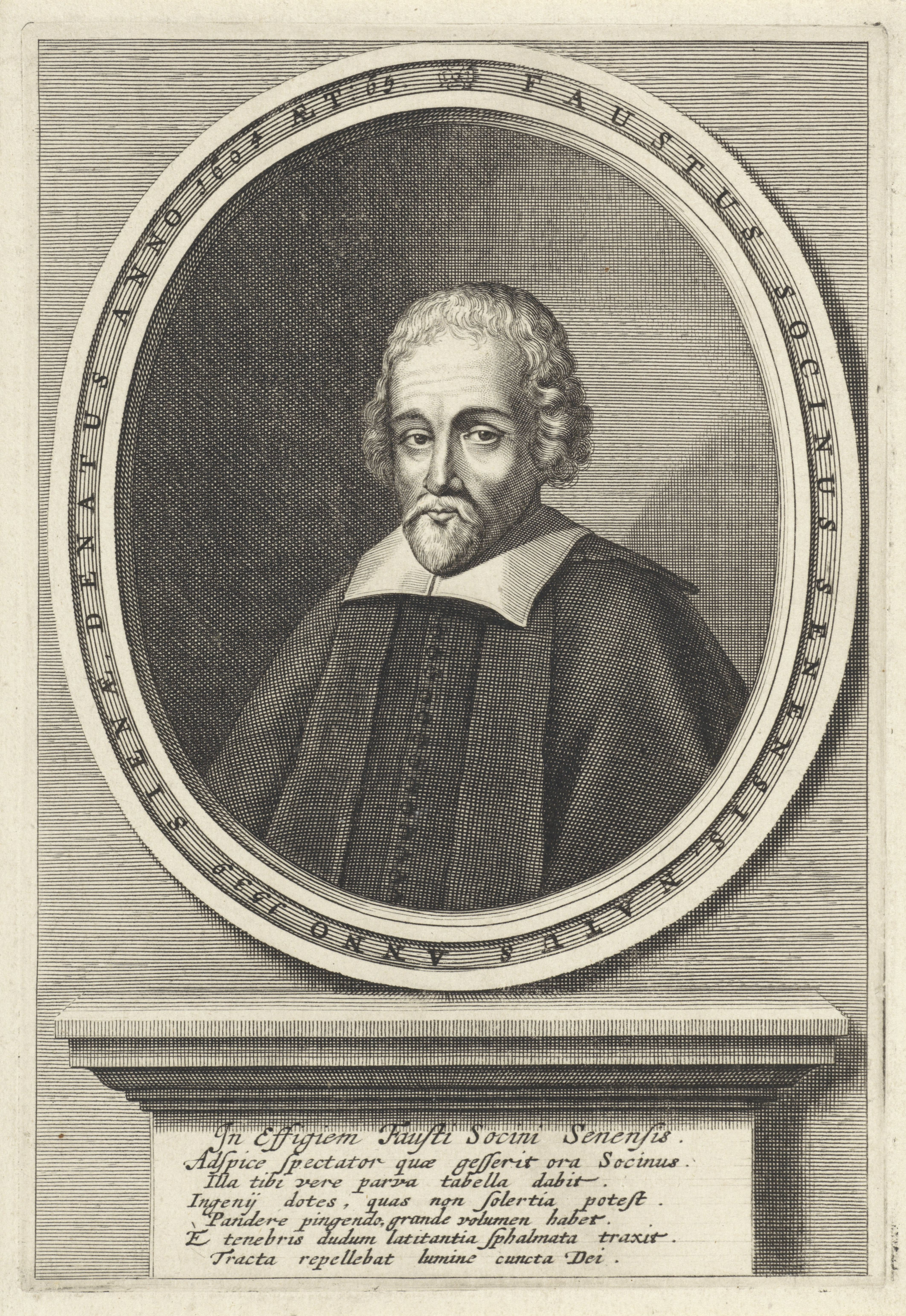
- Born: Fausto Paolo Sozzini; 5 December 1539; Siena, Republic of Siena, Holy Roman Empire
- Died: 4 March 1604 (aged 64); Lusławice, Crown of the Kingdom of Poland, Polish–Lithuanian Commonwealth
- Other name: Faustus Socinus
- Theology career
- Notable work: Explicatio primae partis primi capitis Evangelistae Johannis (1563), Disputatio de Jesu Christo servatore (1578), De sacrae Scripturae auctoritate (1580s), De statu primi hominis ante lapsum disputatio (1610)
- Theological work
- Language: Italian, Neo-Latin
- Tradition or movement: Socinianism
- Notable ideas: Denial of divine foreknowledge regarding the actions of free agents Rejection of the pre-existence of Christ

Philosophical work
- Era: Protestant Reformation; Radical Reformation
- Main interests: Nontrinitarian Christian theology

Fausto Paolo Sozzini (Italian: [ˈfausto ˈpaːolo sotˈtsiːni]; Polish: Faust Socyn; 5 December 1539 – 4 March 1604), often known in English by his Latinized name Faustus Socinus (/ˈfɔːstəs soʊˈsaɪnəs/ FAW-stəs soh-SY-nəs), was an Italian Renaissance humanist and theologian, and, alongside his uncle Lelio Sozzini, founder of the Nontrinitarian Christian belief system known as Socinianism. His doctrine was developed among the Polish Brethren in the Polish Reformed Church between the 16th and 17th centuries, and embraced by the Unitarian Church of Transylvania during the same period.

Fausto Sozzini recollected most of his uncle Lelio's religious writings by traveling over again his routes throughout early modern Europe, and systematized his Antitrinitarian beliefs into a coherent theological doctrine. His polemical treatise De sacrae Scripturae auctoritate (written in the years 1580s and published in England in 1732, with the title A demonstration of the truth of the Christian religion, from the Latin of Socinius) was highly influential on Remonstrant thinkers such as Simon Episcopius, who drew on Sozzini's arguments for viewing the sacred scriptures as historical texts.

== Life ==
Sozzini was born in Siena, capital city of the Republic of Siena, at the time under the rule of the Holy Roman Empire. He was the only son of Alessandro Sozzini and Agnese Petrucci, daughter of Borghese Petrucci (born in 1490), and granddaughter of Pandolfo Petrucci.

His father Alessandro Sozzini, the oldest of eleven brothers, was born in 1509 but died in 1541, in his thirty-second year. Fausto had no regular education, being brought up at home with his sister Fillide, and spent his youth in desultory reading at Borgo Scopeto, the family's country-seat. To the able women of his family he owed the strong moral impress which marked him through life; his early intellectual stimulus came from his uncle Celso Sozzini, a nominal Catholic, but an esprit fort, founder of the short-lived Accademia del Sizienti (1554), of which young Fausto was a member.

In 1556 his grandfather Mariano Sozzini the younger's will, left Fausto, as only son of the oldest son, one fourth of the family estates, which made him independent. Next year he entered the Accademia degli Intronati, the centre of intellectual life in Siena. He joined with the name Frastagliato, while Celso had the name Sonnacchioso. About this time the jurist Guido Panciroli describes him as a young man of fine talent, with promise of a legal career; but he showed little interest for law, preferring to write sonnets.

In 1558–1559 the suspicion of Lutheranism fell on him in common with his uncles Celso and Camillo.

=== Lyons and Geneva ===
Coming of age (1561) he went to Lyon, probably engaging in mercantile business; he revisited Italy after his uncle Lelio Sozzini's death; we find him in 1562 on the roll of the Italian church at Geneva; there is no trace of any relations with Calvin. He returned next year to Lyon. The evangelical position was not radical enough for him. In his Brevis explicatio (Lyons, 1562) of the prologue to St John's Gospel he already attributes to Christ an official, not an essential, deity – already an anti-Trinitarian position; and in a letter of 1563 rejects the immortality of the soul in favour of Christian mortalism; a position subsequently developed in his disputation with the humanist Francesco Pucci.

=== Florence ===
Towards the end of 1563 he returned to Italy, conforming to the Roman Catholic Church, and for twelve years, as, his unpublished letters show, was in the service of noblewoman Isabella de' Medici, daughter of Cosimo I de' Medici, Grand Duke of Tuscany (not, as Samuel Przypkowski says, in the service of the Grand Duke himself). Between 1565 and 1568 he wrote the essay Il Frastagliato Intronato. This portion of his life he regarded as wasted; until 1567 he gave some attention to legal duties, and wrote (1570) his treatise De auctoritate s. scripturae.

In 1571 he was in Rome, probably with his patroness. He left Italy at the end of 1575, and after Isabella's death (allegedly strangled by her husband in 1576) and declined the overtures of her brother Francesco, now grand-duke, who pressed him to return. Francesco was doubtless aware of the motive which led Sozzini to quit Italy; there is every reason to believe Samuel Przypkowski's statement that the grand-duke agreed to secure to him the income of his property so long as he published nothing in his own name.

=== Basel ===
Sozzini now fixed himself at Basel, gave himself to close study of the Bible, began translating the Psalms into Italian verse, and, in spite of increasing deafness, became a centre of theological debates. His discussion with Jacques Couet on the doctrine of salvation issued in a treatise De Jesu Christo servatore (finished 12 July 1578), the circulation of which in manuscript commended him to the notice of Giorgio Biandrata, court physician in Poland and Transylvania, and ecclesiastical wire puller in the interests of heterodoxy.

=== Transylvania ===
Transylvania for a short time (1559–1571) enjoyed full religious liberty under the first unitarian prince, John Sigismund. The current existing ruler, Christopher Bathory, favoured the Jesuits; it was now Biandrata's object to limit the Judaic tendencies of the eloquent anti-Trinitarian bishop, Ferenc Dávid (1510–1579), with whom he had previously co-operated. A charge of the gravest sort against Biandrata's morals had destroyed his influence with David. Hence he called in Sozzini to reason with Dávid, who had renounced the worship of Christ. In Sozzini's scheme of doctrine, terms in themselves orthodox were employed in a heretical sense.

In matter of worship Sozzini distinguished between adoratio Christi, the homage of the heart, imperative on all Christians, and invocatio Christi, the direct address of prayer, which was simply permissive (Biandrata would have made it imperative); though in Sozzini's view, prayer, to whomsoever addressed, was received by Christ as mediator, for transmission to the father.

In November 1578 Sozzini reached Kolozsvár from Poland, and did his best, during a visit of four months and a half under Dávid's roof, to argue him into this modified doctrine of invocation. The upshot was that Dávid exerted all his powers in denouncing all cultus of Christ from the pulpit. Dávid's civil trial followed, on a charge of innovation. Sozzini hurried back to Poland before it began. He cannot be accused of complicity with the actions of Biandrata; he was no party to David's incarceration at the Fortress of Déva, where the old man miserably perished in less than three months. He was willing that Dávid should be prohibited from preaching pending the decision of a general synod; and his references to the case show that (as in the later instances of Jacobus Palaeologus, Christian Franken and Martin Seidel) theological aversions, though they never made him uncivil, froze up his native kindness and blinded his perceptions of character.

Biandrata ultimately conformed to the Catholic Church; hence Sozzini's laudatory dedication to him (1584) of his De Jesu Christi natura, in reply to the Calvinist Andrew Wolan, though printed in his works, was not used.

=== Poland ===
The remainder (1579–1604) of Sozzini's life was spent in Poland. Excluded at first by his views on baptism (which he regarded as applicable only to Gentile converts) from the Ecclesia Minor or anti-Trinitarian Church (largely anabaptist), he acquired by degrees a predominant influence in its synods.

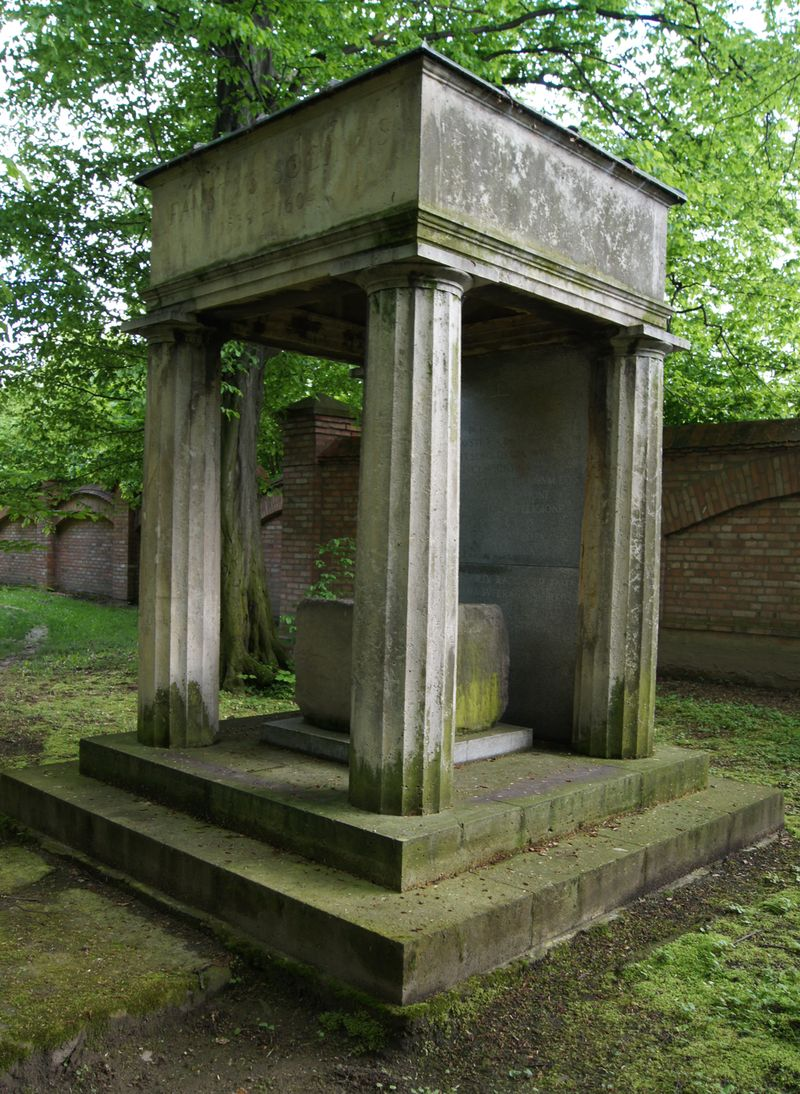
Mausoleum of Faustus Socinus in Luslawice

He was asked by the Polish Brethren to take up the position of a champion of conscientious objection against the Belarusian Symon Budny and the Greek Unitarian Jacobus Palaeologus after Gregory Pauli of Brzeziny had become indisposed, and thereby gained some respect among the Poles.

Fausto Sozzini converted the Arian section of the Ecclesia Minor from belief in the pre-existence of Christ to the early Unitarian position, and from their rejection of the invocatio Christi. He repressed the semi-Judaizers whom he failed to convince. Through correspondence with friends he influenced also the policy of the anti-Trinitarian Church of Transylvania.

Forced to leave Kraków in 1583, he found a home with a Polish noble, Christopher Morsztyn, whose daughter Elizabeth he married (1586). She died in the following year, a few months after the birth of a daughter, Agnese (1587–1654), afterwards the wife of Stanisław Wiszowaty, father of Andreas Wiszowaty, and the progenitress of numerous descendants. In 1587 the grand-duke Francesco died; to this event Sozzini's biographers attribute the loss of his Italian property, but his unpublished letters show that he was on good terms with the new grand-duke, Ferdinando. Family disputes had arisen respecting the interpretation of his grandfather's will; in October 1590 the holy office at Siena disinherited him, allowing him a pension, apparently never paid.

The end of financial remittances from his property in Italy dissolved the agreement under which his writings were to remain anonymous, and Sozzini began to publish in his own name. The consequence was that in 1598 a mob expelled him from Kraków, wrecking his house, and beating him. Friends gave him a ready welcome at Luslawice, 30 miles east from Kraków; and here, having long been "troubled with colic and the stone", he died on 4 March 1604. A limestone block with illegible inscriptions marks his grave. His engraved portrait is prefixed to his works (the original is not extant); an oil painting, formerly at Siena, cannot be considered authentic.

== Works ==
Sozzini's works, edited by his grandson Andrzej Wiszowaty and the learned printer Frans Kuyper, are contained in two closely printed folios (Amsterdam, 1668). They rank as the first two volumes of the Bibliotheca fratrum polonorum though the works of Johann Crell and Jonas Schlichting were the first of the series to be printed. They include all Sozzini's extant theological writings, except his essay on predestination (in which he denies that God foresees the actions of free agents) prefixed to Castellio's Dialogi IV (1575, reprinted 1613) and his revision of a school manual Instrumentum doctrinarum aristotelium (1586).

His pseudonyms, easily interpreted, were Felix Turpio Urhevetanus, Prosper Dysidaeus, Gratianus Prosper and Gratianus Turpio Gerapolensis (Senensis). Some of his early verse is in Ferentillis Scielta di stanze di diversi autori toscani (1579, 1594); other specimens are given in Cant and in the Athenaeum (Aug. II, 1877); more are preserved at Siena.

Sozzini considered that his ablest work was his Contra atheos, which perished in the riot at Kraków (1598). Later he began, but left incomplete, more than one work designed to exhibit his system as a whole.

His reputation as a thinker must rest upon the De auctoritate scripturae sacrae (1570) and De Jesu Christo servatore (1578). The former was first published (Seville [London, John Wolfe], 1588) by López, a Jesuit, who claimed it as his own, but prefixed a preface maintaining (contrary to a fundamental position of Sozzini) that man by nature has a knowledge of God. A French version (1592) was approved by the ministers of Basel; the English translation by Rev. Edward Coombe (Somerset 1731) was undertaken in consequence of the commendation in a charge (1728) by Bishop Richard Smalbroke, who observes that Grotius had borrowed from it in his De veritate Christ. rel.. In small compass it anticipates the historical argument of the credibility writers; in trying it by modern tests, it should be remembered that Sozzini, regarding it (1581) as not adequately meeting the cardinal difficulties attending the proof of the Christian religion, began to reconstruct its positions in his Lectiones sacrae (unfinished). His treatise on the Saviour renders a real service to theology, placing orthodoxy and heresy in new relations of fundamental antagonism, and narrowing the conflict to the main personal benefit of religion.

Of the person of Christ in this treatise he says nothing; its one topic is the work of Christ, which in his view operates upon man alone; the theological sagacity of Sozzini may be measured by the persistency with which this idea tends to recur. Though his name has been attached to a school of opinion, he disclaimed the rôle of a heresiarch, and declined to give his unreserved adhesion to any one sect. His confidence in the conclusions of his own mind has earned him the repute of a dogmatist; but it was his constant aim to reduce and simplify the fundamentals of Christianity. Not without some ground does the memorial tablet at Siena (inscription by prof. Giovanni Brigidi 1879) characterize him as vindicator of human reason against the supernatural.

Of his non-theological doctrines the most important is his assertion of the unlawfulness not only of war, but of the taking of human life in any circumstances. Hence the comparative mildness of his proposals for dealing with religious and anti-religious offenders, though it cannot be said that he had grasped the complete theory of toleration. Hence, too, his contention that magisterial office is unlawful for a Christian.

== See also ==
- Arianism
- Catholic Inquisition
- English Dissenters
- Heresy in Christianity
- History of Christian theology
- Polish Brethren
- Racovian Catechism
- Remonstrants
- Unitarianism

== Bibliography ==
- Bowers, J. D. (2007). "English Socinianism: Antecedent to American Unitarianism". Joseph Priestley and English Unitarianism in America. University Park, Pennsylvania: Pennsylvania State University Press. pp. 15–42. ISBN 978-0-271-02950-4. LCCN 2006100016.
- Bowers, J. D. (2007). "The Socinian Migration and the Founding of American Unitarianism". Joseph Priestley and English Unitarianism in America. University Park, Pennsylvania: Pennsylvania State University Press. pp. 43–76. ISBN 978-0-271-02950-4. LCCN 2006100016.
- Mortimer, Sarah (2010). Reason and Religion in the English Revolution: The Challenge of Socinianism. Cambridge Studies in Early Modern British History. Cambridge: Cambridge University Press. ISBN 978-0-521-51704-1. LCCN 2010000384.
- Mulsow, Martin; Rohls, John, eds. (2005). Socinianism And Arminianism: Antitrinitarians, Calvinists, And Cultural Exchange in Seventeenth-Century Europe. Brill's Studies in Intellectual History. Vol. 134. Leiden: Brill Publishers. ISBN 978-90-04-14715-7. ISSN 0920-8607.
