= Martin Seidel =

Polish Unitarian

Martin Seidelius (Oława fl. 1610–1620) was a Polish Unitarian.

Martin Seidel was a refugee from Oława in Silesia, who sided with the Szekler Sabbatarians of the Unitarian movement in Transylvania, which Sozzini characterised as "semi-judaizers". Seidel rejected the Messianic doctrine of the New Testament. In 1611 he published Miscellanea; hoc est, Scripta theologica seu tractatus breves de vidersis with Jan Niemojewski.

In 1618 he recorded the debate on worship of Christ between Fausto Sozzini and Christian Francken. Disputatio de adoratione Christi, habita inter F. Socinum & C. Francken (246 pages).

His Origo et fundamenta de religione Christianae (post 1680) shows a deist position.
