= Mariano Sozzini =

Italian jurist

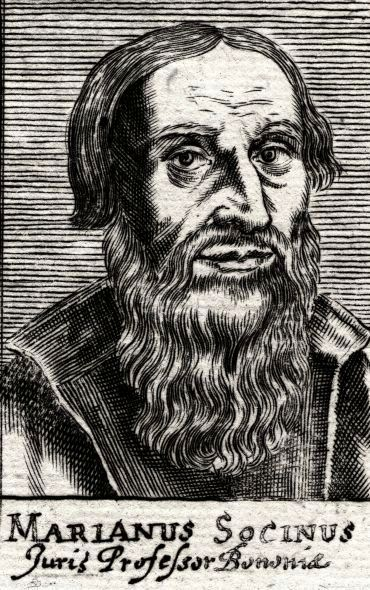
Mariano Sozzini

Mariano Sozzini il giovane also Socini (1482–1556) was an Italian jurist after whom the cautela sociniana is named. He was descended from Mariano Sozzini the elder, the first of the family of freethinkers.

Mariano the younger was born in Siena. He married Agnese Petrucci and had seven sons including Celso Sozzini, Lelio Sozzini, and Alessandro Sozzini, who died young, but was father of Fausto Sozzini, became the figurehead of the Unitarian "Socinian" movement in Poland.

== Biography ==
Mariano Socini was the son of Bartolomeo and grandson of Mariano Socini the elder, themselves eminent jurists of Siena. He married Camilla Salvetti, by whom he had thirteen children according to Guido Panciroli; among the seven boys were Celso Sozzini, Lelio Sozzini and Alessandro Sozzini the younger, father of Fausto Sozzini, who gave his name to the Socinian Unitarian movement in Poland.

He studied in Siena and University of Bologna and graduated from Siena in 1504, where he remained until at least 1517. He then taught in Pisa between 1517 and 1523, then returned to Siena in 1523, before going to Padua in 1525, where he remained until 1542. He was at that time paid 1,000 ducats as a professor of civil law. He left Padua for Bologna in 1542-1543, where he succeeded Andrea Alciato and had Antonio Agustín y Albanell among his students, remaining until his death in 1556. In April 1552 he was paid 5 200 Bolognese lire, the second highest salary in the university.

In 1553, he was the subject of an investigation of the Bologna Inquisition following a request by Inquisitor Reginaldo Nerli, which, however, was interrupted by his predecessor, Girolamo Muzzarelli, and Pope Julius III. He was reconciled in early 1554.

Mariano Socini the Younger was consulted on legal matters by European rulers such as Henry VIII on the case of divorce. He replied that the pope had not granted the exemption that allowed Henry VIII to marry the widow of his brother Arthur, Prince of Wales and that therefore his marriage to Catherine of Aragon was invalid and that he was free to marry Anne Boleyn.

== Works ==
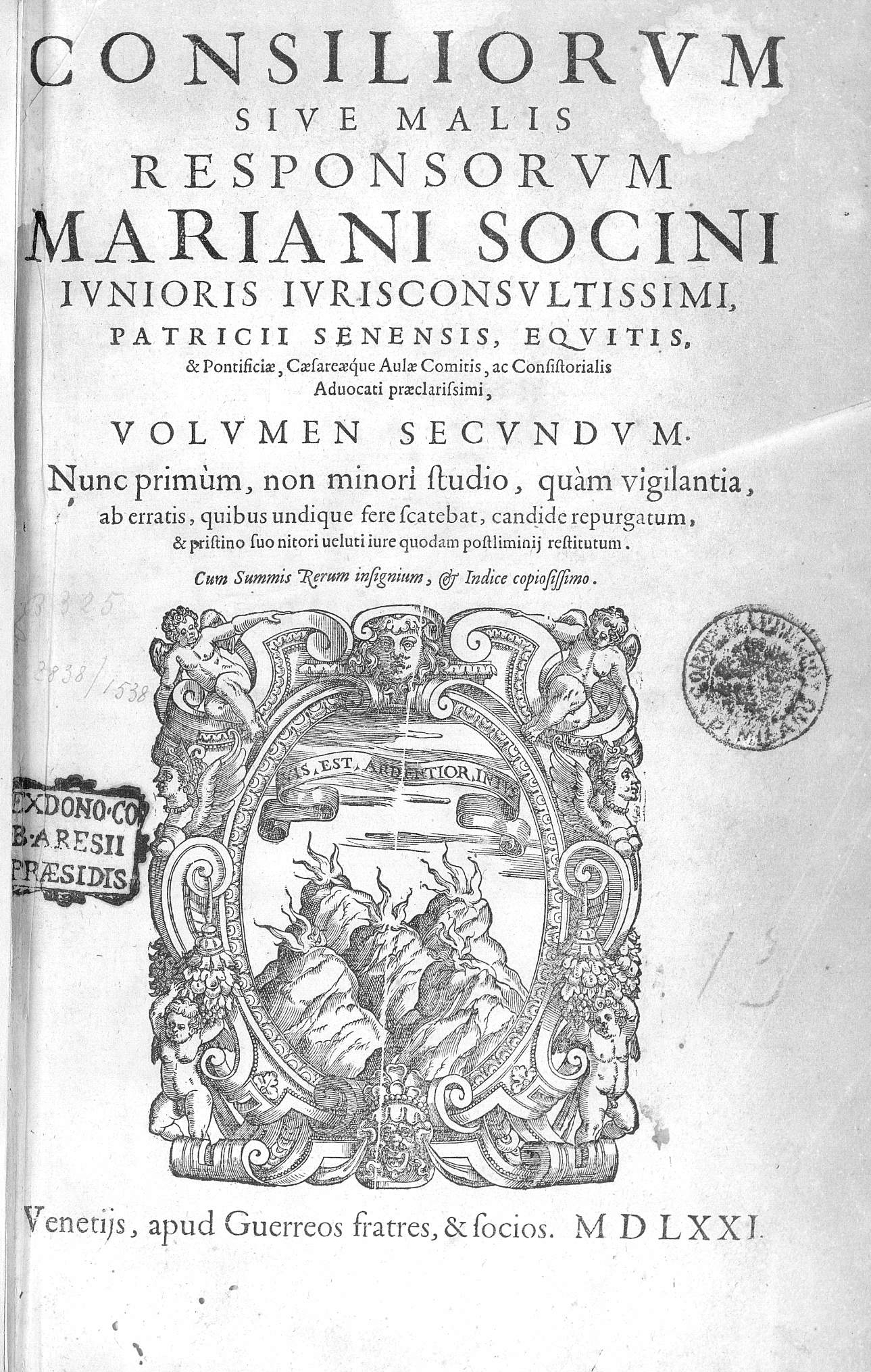
Consilia, 1571

- Consilia (Consiliorum siue malis Responsorum Mariani Socini iunioris iurisconsultissimi, patricii, Senensis, equitis, & Pontificiæ, Cæsareæque Aulæ Comitis, ac Consistorialis Aduocati præclarissimi) (in Latin). Vol. 1. Venice. 1571.
  - Consilia (in Latin). Vol. 2. Venice: Domenico Guerra & Giovanni Battista Guerra & C. 1571.
  - Consilia (in Latin). Vol. 3. Venice: Domenico Guerra & Giovanni Battista Guerra & C. 1571.
- Commentaria (in Latin). Vol. 1. Venice: Società dell'Aquila che si rinnova. 1585.
  - Commentaria. Vol. 2. Venice: Società dell'Aquila che si rinnova. 1585.
