= Jacques Couet =

Jaques Couet du Vivier (Couët) (Paris 1546 - Basel, 18 January 1608) was a Huguenot pastor.

Couet was born to minor nobility, son of Philibert Couet du Vivier et Marie Gohorry, a Huguenot family. After the St. Bartholomew's Day massacre (1572) he appears to have fled to Scotland for a time. While in Basel, while Couet was still a divinity student, he engaged in a debate with Fausto Sozzini, who was resident in the city 1575-1575, which led to Sozzini's work on the satisfaction of Christ De Jesu Christo Servatore. After a period in Bourgogne the problems of the Ligue caused him to remove to Basel in 1585. Afterwards Couet became minister of the French Huguenot church in Basel, but when normal conditions resumed continued to journey to and preach in Paris. On 17 July 1590 he was appointed by Henri IV as one of the eight pastors who should preach to him quarterly. Couet died on 18 January 1608 and was buried in the temple of the Dominicans.

He published several works including in 1600 a transcript of La Conférence faicte à Nancy between a Jesuit, a capuchin and two Huguenots. He amassed a large and unusual library which after his death was inherited by his grandson, a lawyer also called Jacques Couet du Vivier.

== Works ==
- Response chrestienne et tres-nécessaire en ce temps, à l'épistre d'un certain François qui s'est efforcé de maintenir l'opinion de ceux qui croient la présence du corps de Christ dans le pain de la Cène, et mesme en tous lieux, escrite et mise en lumière par Jaques Couet,... 1588
- Refutation des mensonges mis en avant par un qui sous le masque du nom de Nicolas d'Aubenerd se presente en un libelle diffamatoyre, intitulé: Response brève aux medisances calomnies & injures. 1593
- Responses chrestienes aux doctrines non chrestienes, contenues ès libelles diffamatoires d'Antoyne Lescaille: Avec une Remonstrance nécessaire adressée audit Lescaille. Par Léonard Constant. de l'imprimerie de Iacob Stoer. 1593.
- Apologia de iustificatione nostri coram Deo: in qua Ecclesias Gellicas Reformatas in hoc praecipuo doctrinae Christianae capite ... unum & idem, semtire adversus quorundam Schismaticorum calumnias, maninifestissimè [sic] demonstratur. 1594
- De Iesu Christo servatore, hoc est cur & qua ratione Iesus Christus noster seruator sit, Fausti Socini Senensis disputatio. repondes Iacobo Coveto. Typis Alexii Rodecii. 1594
- Advertissement et requeste tres chrestienne de Notre Seigneur Iesus Christ, a toutes les Eglises Protestantes [qui] sont soubs la domination du Roy tres-Chrestien. Avec Le sommaire de la doctrine de M. Theodore de Beze & de M. Jacques Couët, & Leonard Constant, Ministre de l'Église Françoise de Basle. Editor Philippe du Pré, 1596.
- Antwort auf ein Schreiben von der Gegenwärtigkeit des Leibes und Blutes Christi im Abendmahl. 1599
- La conference faicte a Nancy, entre un docteur iesuite accompagné d'vn Capuchin, & deux Ministres de la parole de Diev: descrite par Iaqves Covet, Parisien... Imprimé à Basle. M. DC. (German translation: Collation oder Gesprech zu Nancy gehalten zwischen einem Jesuitischen Doktor und zweyen Dienern des Worts Gottes 1601)
