= Johann Wolff =

German jurist

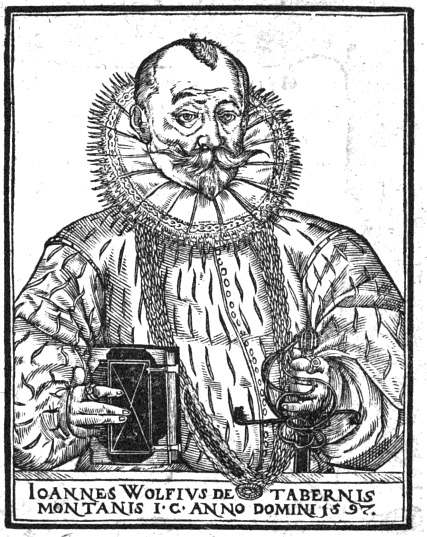
Joannes Wolfius de Tabernis Montanis, Johann Wolf of Bergzabern 1597

Johann Wolf Joannes Wolfius (10 August 1537 in Bergzabern – 23 May 1600 in Mundelsheim) was a German jurist who corresponded with Lelio Sozzini on the sacrament 1555. He was also a diplomat, translator, historian and theologian.

He married in 1572 Maria Magdalena Achtsynit, she died in 1581. The next year he married Christina von Bühel, she died in 1591. In 1592 he married the widow Barbara Schaiblin.

From these wives he had five daughters and two sons.

== Works ==
- Lectiones memorabiles et reconditae 1600.
- Artis historicae penus : octodecim scriptorum tam veterum quam recentiorum monumentis. Basileae : Ex officina Petri Pernae, 1579.
