= Immanuel Tremellius =

Italian Jewish convert to Christianity and translator

Immanuel Tremellius (Italian: Giovanni Emmanuele Tremellio; 1510 – 9 October 1580) was an Italian Jewish convert to Christianity. He was known as a leading Hebraist and Bible translator.

== Life ==
He was born at Ferrara and educated at the University of Padua. He was converted about 1540 to the Catholic faith through Cardinal Pole but embraced Protestantism in the following year, before going to Strasbourg to teach Hebrew.

Owing to the Schmalkaldic War in Germany, he was compelled to seek asylum in England, where he resided at Lambeth Palace with Archbishop Cranmer in 1547. Two years later, he succeeded Paul Fagius as Regius professor of Hebrew at Cambridge.

On the death of King Edward VI he returned to Germany in 1553. At Zweibrücken he was imprisoned as a Calvinist. He became professor of Old Testament at the University of Heidelberg in 1561 and remained there until he was released from his post in 1577. He ultimately found refuge at the College of Sedan, where he died. According to Morison, he "when dying reversed his nation's decision, and exclaimed, Not Barabbas, but Jesus! (Vivat Christus, et pereat Barabbas!)."

== Works ==
His chief literary work was a Latin translation of the Bible from the Hebrew and Syriac. The New Testament translation, by Theodore Beza, appeared in 1569, at Geneva. The five parts relating to the Old Testament were published at Frankfurt between 1575 and 1579, in London in 1580, and in numerous later editions. The work was joint with Franciscus Junius (the elder), his son-in-law. Harris Fletcher remarks that there were two quite different versions of Tremellius available in the late 1500s:

The Junius-Tremellius Bible first appeared from 1575-79, and subsequently in two different major forms. One of these in 1585 was printed as a tall folio with copious marginal notes, which were for the greater part written by Tremellius. The folio editions contained, in addition to Tremellius' Latin Old Testament with this large amount of marginal notation, a complete Latin translation of the Apochrypha done by Junius, and two Latin translations of the New Testament, one being of the fragmentary Syriac version by Tremellius, and the other from the Greek by Beza. The other form in which this Bible appeared was printed, usually in quarto, without notes, with the Apochrypha, and after 1585 with only Beza's translation of the New Testament.

The Tremellius translation was favored by John Milton, "undoubtedly" the folio version, with Tremellius's marginal notes, according to Harris. It was used also by John Donne for his version of Lamentations. Archbishop James Ussher also used the Junius-Tremellius translation when compiling his Annals of the World.

Tremellius also translated John Calvin's Geneva Catechism into Hebrew (Paris, 1551), and wrote a "Chaldaic" and Syriac grammar (Paris, 1569).

== See also ==
- Theodore Beza
