= Domenico Massenzio =

Italian composer

Domenico Massenzio (28 March 1586 – 23 October 1657) was an Italian baroque composer.

His lifetime «coincides perfectly with the conception and implementation of the Counter-Reformation, the largest-scale operation of ideological communication ever carried out in Europe».
He worked at the Seminario Romano (1612), Collegio Inglese (1624-6), Cappella Giulia (1626-7).

His first two collections of music (the 'Sacrae cantiones' in 1612 and the 'Motecta [...] liber secundus' in 1614), were dedicated respectively to Cardinal Odoardo Farnese and to Cardinal Benedetto Giustiniani (1544-1621), a Jesuit and a great appreciator of music.

Between 1629 and 1636, Massenzio published eight books of music. In 1631, he wrote the Sacri Mottetti «to be sung by ordinary voices or again by nuns». He also tried to export his music (the Psalmi Davidici of 1636) into the new lands of Brazil.

After 1646, Domenico Massenzio did not publish any further music until his death.

== Works, editions and recordings ==
- Domenico Massenzio da Ronciglione, Opera Omnia, Critical Edition by Claudio Dall'Albero - Mauro Bacherini, Rugginenti, Milan, 2008
- Hill, John Walter: 'Roman monody, cantata, opera'
- The office of compline (polyphonic setting). Choir of St John's College, Cambridge, dir. George Guest, Meridian, 1988
- Tullio Cima, Domenico Massenzio e la musica del loro tempo: atti del convegno internazionale (Ronciglione, 30 ottobre-1° novembre 1997): Fabio Carboni, Valeria De Lucca, Agostino Ziino - 2003
- Franchi, Saverio - Dizionario Biografico degli Italiani - Vol. 71 (2008): MASSENZIO, Domenico
