= Gian Paolo Alciati =

Italian Calvinist

For other people surnamed Alciati

Dr. Giovanni Paolo Alciati della Motta (1515 in Savigliano – 1573) was an Italian Calvinist and friend of Giorgio Biandrata and Giovanni Valentino Gentile, one of the participants of the antitrinitarian Council of Venice in 1550. Like Biandrata and Negri he moved to in Poland.
