= François Douaren =

French jurist (1509–1559)

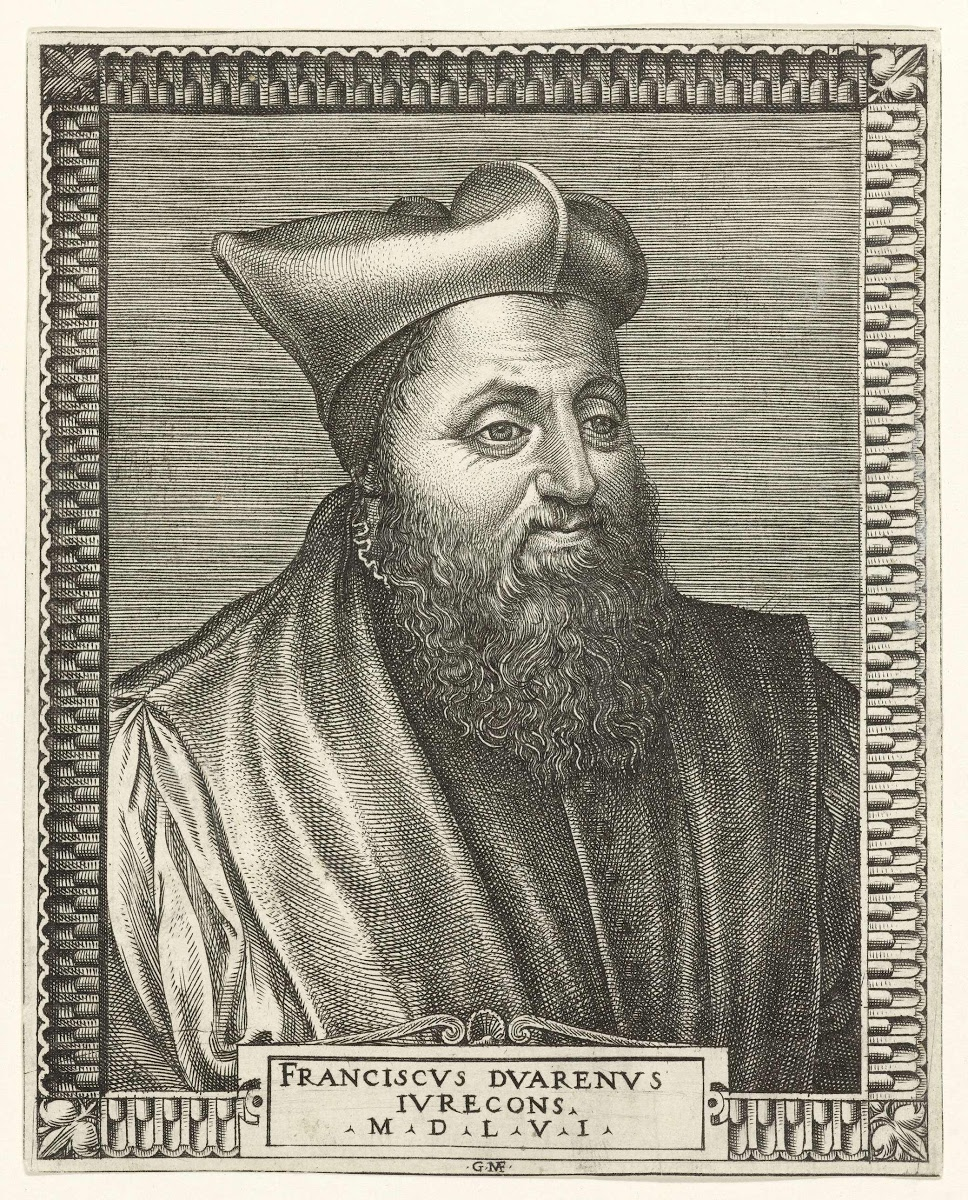

François Douaren (or le Douaren) (also sometimes spelled Duaren; Latin: Franciscus Duarenus) (1509, near Saint-Brieuc – 1559, Bourges) was a French jurist and professor of law at the University of Bourges.

After studies in Paris under Budé and in Bourges, Douaren worked as an advocate for the Parlement of Paris. In 1538, he was called to teach at Bourges. Following a bitter dispute with Baro, he abandoned the chair for Paris until Baro's death in 1550, after which Douaren returned to teach at Bourges.

Like his compatriots Jacques Cujas, François Hotman and Hugues Doneau, Douaren was one of the leading representatives of the legal humanist school of thought within the science of Roman law on the European continent. These 16th-century French law professors applied the philological methods of the Italian humanists to legal texts. It was their aim to arrive at a historically more accurate understanding of the texts of the Roman Corpus Iuris Civilis.

In addition to numerous commentaries on the Corpus, Douaren wrote a leading commentary on the Roman law of obligations, Commentarius de pactis (1544), which greatly influenced modern theories of obligations. His 1544 programme of studies, De ratione docendi discendique iuris epistola, was the first statement of the mos gallicus, the French Humanist approach to higher education. Its core contents – language studies, introductory classes on the base of the Justinian Code, a methodical approach based on the laws of the Corpus – came to be introduced at most European legal faculties.

== Works ==
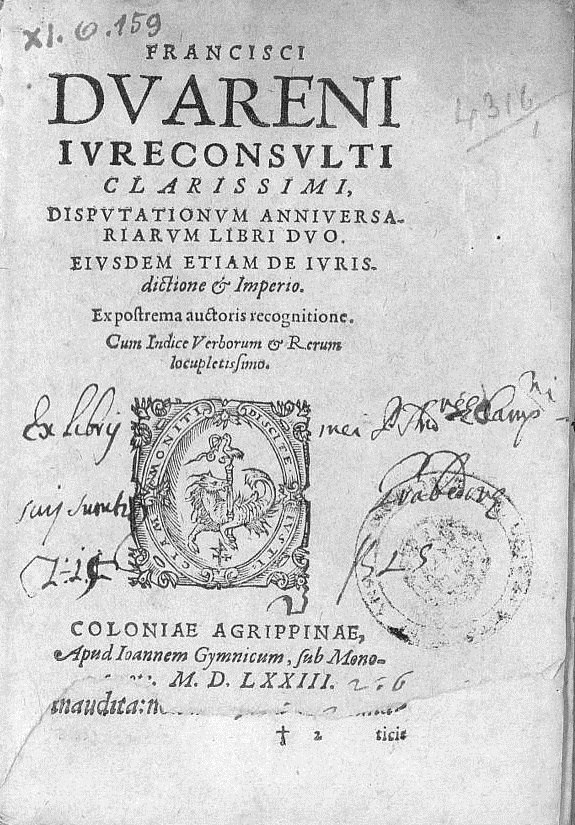
Disputationes anniversariae, 1573

- Disputationes anniversariae (in Latin). Köln: Johann Gymnich. 1573.
