= Jakob Bornitz =

Jakob Bornitz (Latinized, Jacobi Bornitii or Jacobus Bornitius) (c. 1560–1625) was a German writer.

== Bibliography ==
- Discursus politicus, Erfurt (1602), Neuaufl. Wittenberg (1604);
- De nummis (Vom Gelde), Hanau (1608);
- De Majestate, Leipzig (1610);
- De praemiis, (1610);
- Aerarium, Frankfurt (1612);
- Tractatus politicus De Rerum Sufficientia In Rep. et Civitate procuranda. Frankfurt (1625)
