= Guido Panciroli =

Italian jurist, professor, historian and antiquarian

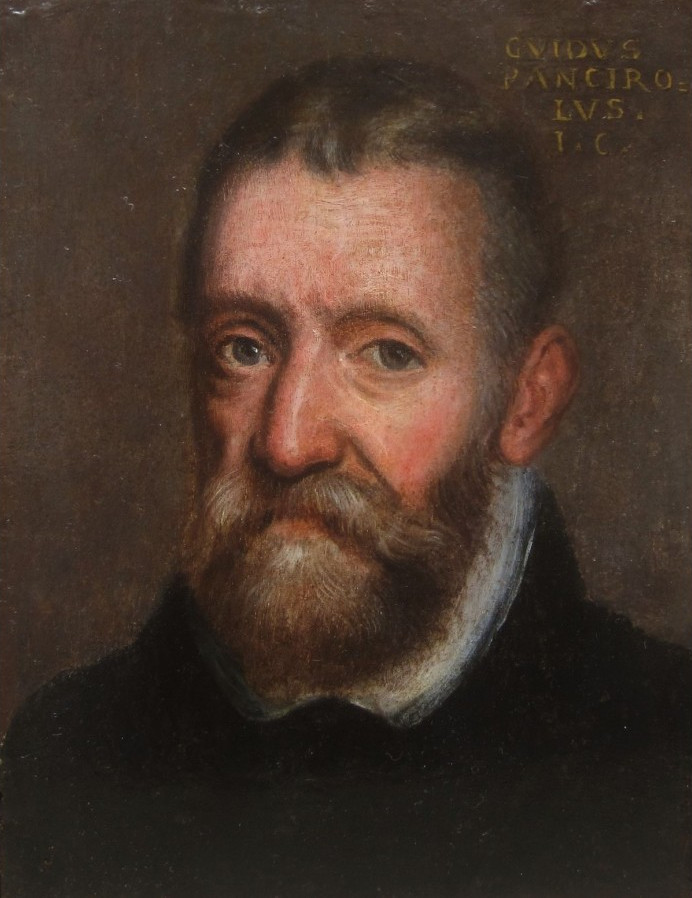
- Guido Panciroli – Oil painting, an artist in the circle of Tintoretto
- Born: 17 April 1523; Reggio Emilia, Italy
- Died: 5 March 1599 (aged 75); Padova, Italy
- Education: University of Ferrara
- Occupations: Jurist, law professor, historian, and antiquarian

Guido Panciroli or Pancirolli (Note: Also called Guidi, Guidus, Pancirollus and Panziroli in older publications) (17 April 1523 – 5 March 1599) was a sixteenth-century Italian antiquarian, historian, jurist and law professor at Ferrara, Padua and Turin. In his time he was renowned as a legal scholar, teaching students who came from all around Europe. Posthumously, he was well known for his innovative comparative survey, Rerum memorabilium, iam olim deperditarum, that brought attention to the loss of knowledge since the ancient world.

== Biography ==
Panciroli was born in Reggio Emilia on 17 April 1523, son of the jurist Alberto Panciroli. In his youth, he received a humanist classical education and in 1540, he went to Ferrara to study law. He graduated on the 25 October 1547 and held a teaching position in Padua. In 1570, he moved to Turin to teach.

He was patronized by the Duke of Savoy, Emmanuel Philibert, teaching in civil law and receiving a very healthy salary of 1000 scudi. Panciroli distinguished himself by introducing his humanistic and historical knowledge into the study of jurisprudence. Near the end of his life, he was requested by Pope Gregory XIV and Clement VIII to be the auditor of the Rota, though he refused.

Panciroli published many works in his lifetime and many of his unpublished manuscripts, such as the Rerum memorabilium, circulated widely in Europe and became very influential. Aside from the Rerum memorabilium, Panciroli's De claris legum interpretibus libri quatuor was an influential and ambitious early history of classical and medieval jurisprudence. Though it was not entirely accurate, it was the most complete history available to a scholar at the time and became very influential in legal circles.

Panciroli died in Padova on 5 March 1599. He had a solemn and well attended public funeral. His nephew, Ottavio, wrote a short biography of him in 1637.

== Rerum memorabilium, iam olim deperditarum ==
The Rerum memorabilium was first commissioned by Panciroli's patron, Emmanuel Philibert, Duke of Savoy, who commissioned it to show (in Panciroli's words from the book's dedication) "the majesty and grandeur, the glory and greatness of [...] the whole universe [...] versed in those secrets".^{:A4} The Rerum memorabilium was first written in Italian, though it wasn't published in its original language until 1612. It was first published and translated into Latin by Panciroli's student, Heinrich Salmuth, in 1599 and 1602. In this version it received most attention, being that Latin was the lingua franca of Europe at the time. The book spread rapidly through Europe. It was translated into French in 1617 by Pierre de la Noue, partially translated into English by Henry Peacham in 1638, and later fully translated in 1715.

The Rerum memorabilium attempted to catalogue the wisdom and knowledge that had been lost from ancient civilisations which Panciroli named deperdita (things lost). Notably, this survey focused on (in its deperdita) subjects in natural philosophy, alchemy and medicine that had been lost since from the ancient world, focusing less on immaterial philosophical, institutional and, religious ideas that had been lost. This had a great influential on Renaissance writers as it inspired a rebirth of study into classical works of technology and science, rediscovering this deperdita, in opposition to the Medieval focus on ancient philosophy. According to historian of science Vera Keller, this inspired Renaissance writers like Francis Bacon, Jakob Bornitz and Thomas Hobbes into the study of study desiderata (things wanted) such as immortality and universal language - with much of Pancirola's deperdita appearing on popular seventeenth-century 'wish-lists' of desiderata.

== Works ==
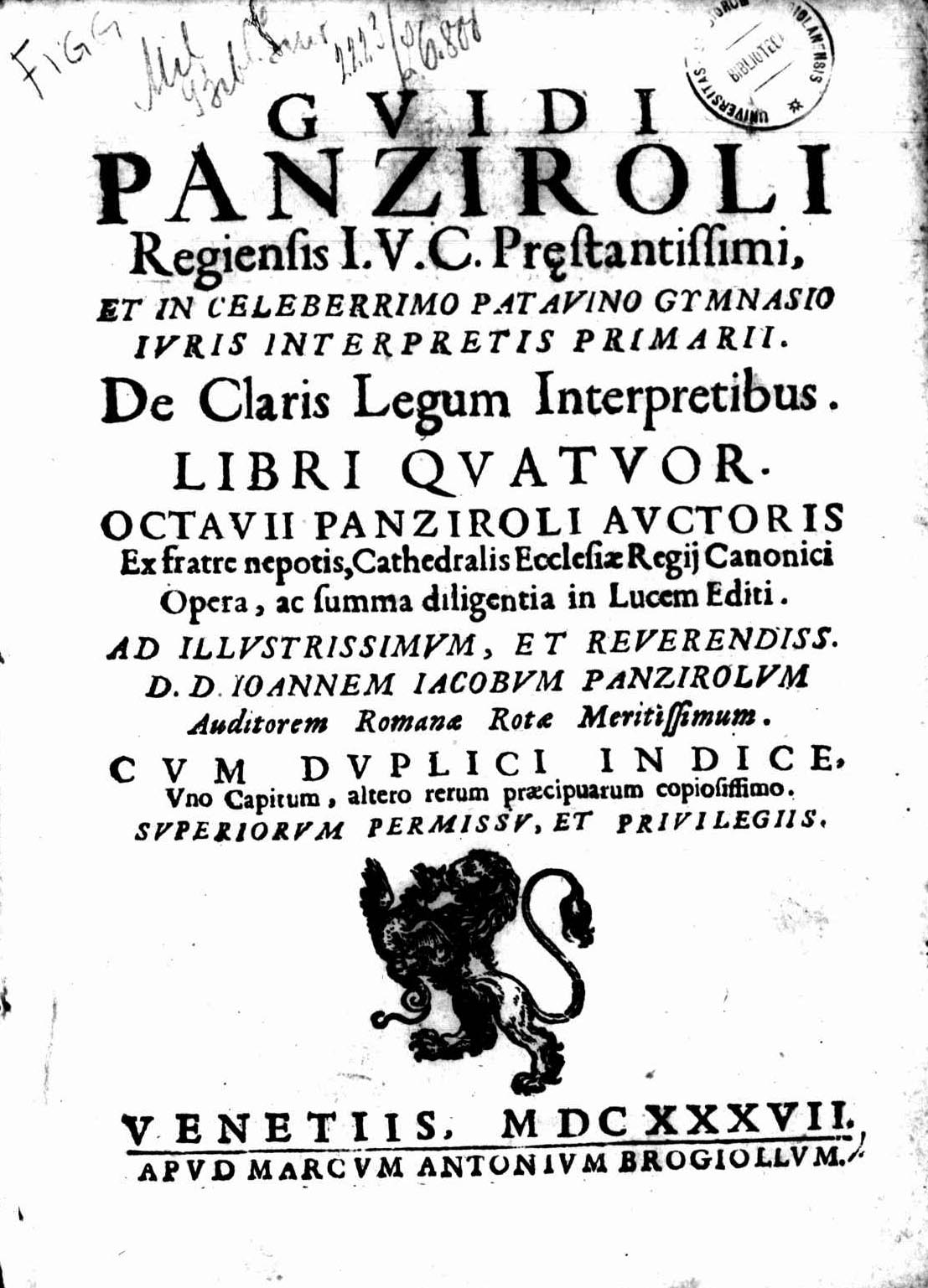
De claris legum interpretibus, 1637

- De Magistratibus Municipalibus, et Corporibus artificum
- De quatuordecim regionibus Urbis Romae, earumdemque aedificiis tam publicis, quam privatis
- De Rebus Bellicis
- Rerum historicarum patriae suae libri octo
- De claris legum interpretibus (in Latin). Venice: Marco Antonio Brogiollo. 1637.
- De claris iurisconsultis
- Thesaurus variarum lectionum utriusque iuris
- Rerum memorabilium, iam olim deperditarum et contra recens atque ingeniose inventarum libri duo
  Raccolta breve d’alcune cose più segnalate ch’ebbero gli antichi, e d’alcune altre trovate dai moderni
  Livre premier des antiquitez perdues, et si au vif representées par la plume
  The History of Many Memorable Things Lost, which Were in Use Among the Ancients
- Consiliorum siue responsorum iuris d. Guidi Panciroli Regiensis
- Civilium iudiciorum praxis sive Ordo iudiciarius
