= Alciati =

Alciati is an Italian surname. Notable people with the surname include:

- Andrea Alciato, or Alciati (1492–1550) (Andreas Alciatus), Italian jurist
- Dr. Gian Paolo Alciati della Motta (1515–1573) Italian Calvinist
- Francesco Alciati (1522–1580), Italian Cardinal
- Enrique Alciati (died after 1912), French-Italian sculptor
