= Cornelio Sozzini =

Italian humanist

Cornelio Sozzini (died c. 1586) was an Italian humanist and early Unitarian. He was one of the sons of the law professor Lelio Sozzini.

Cornelio was raised mostly in Padua where his father Marcantonio Sozzini, or Mariano Sozzini, was a law professor. With his brother Lelio Sozzini he spent most of his adult life in Bologna, eventually leaving since "heretics" were safer in Switzerland.
