= Antoine Dadin de Hauteserre =

French jurist (1602–1682)

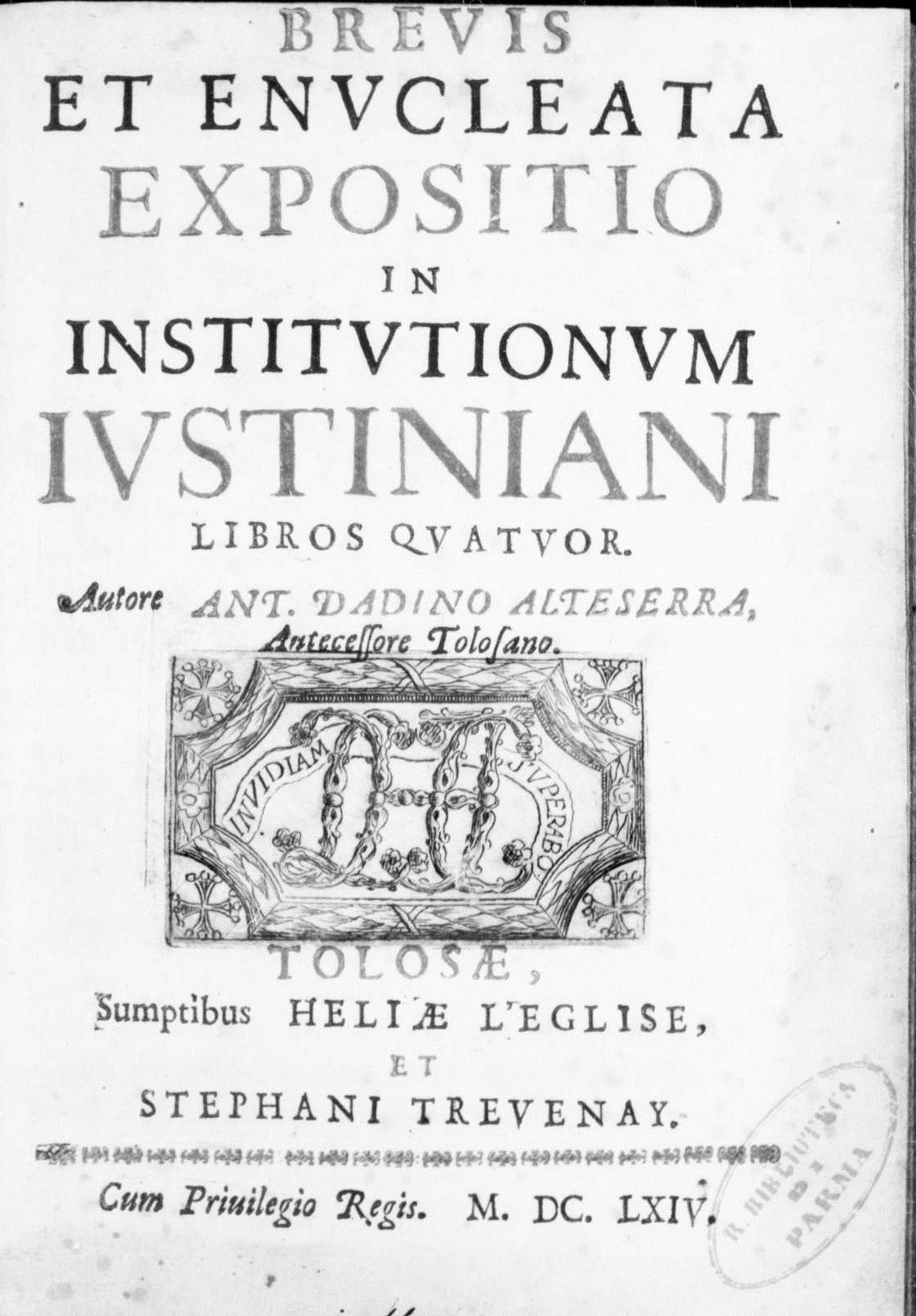
Brevis et enucleata expositio in Institutionum Iustiniani libros quatuor, 1664

Antoine Dadin de Hauteserre (1602 – 1682) was a French jurist. He was also referred to as Dadinus Alteserra, Dadino Alteserra or D'Autreserre.

== Biography ==
Born in 1602, in Cahors, de Hauteserre taught law at the University of Toulouse from 1644 on and distinguished himself in civil and canon law. The church awarded him a pension as a reward of his defence of ecclesiastical jurisdiction.

Dadin de Hauteserre's principal work was De fictionibus iuris (published 1659 and 1679). His confutation of Charles Fevret's De abusu, in which he defended the church, was published in 1778 at the earliest.

He died in Toulouse.

== Bibliography ==
- Nagel, Petra (2001). "D'Autreserre, Antoine". In Michael Stolleis (ed.). Juristen: ein biographisches Lexikon; von der Antike bis zum 20. Jahrhundert (in German) (2nd ed.). München: Beck. p. 157. ISBN 3-406-45957-9.
