= Council of Venice =

The Council of Veneto or Synod at Venice 1550 was a meeting in Venice of the anabaptist radicals of Northern Italy.

== History ==
The council had been preceded by the antitrinitarian Collegia Vicentina (Lat. Vicenza colloquia) in Vicenza in which Lelio Sozzini took a leading role in 1546.

In late 1549 or early 1550 Anabaptists began to assemble again in Vicenza.

In September 1550 sixty Anabaptist leaders, including 20 or 30 exiles from Switzerland, assembled in Venice.

Under the impetus of two followers of Servetus, "Camillo Renato" (Paolo Ricci) and a "Tiziano" (possibly Lorenzo Tizzano) the synod agreed on a set of anti-Trinitarian principles.

The exact attendance list is unknown, since the conclusions were published anonymously, but various significant figures were likely to have been among the sixty. Among the names suggested is Celio Secondo Curione.
