= Alessandro Sozzini =

Italian humanist

Alessandro Sozzini (1508 – April 1541, in Macerata) was an Italian humanist, son of Mariano Sozzini the younger, and the father of Fausto Sozzini.
