= Hugues Doneau =

French law professor (1527–1591)

Hugues Doneau (Hugo Donellus)
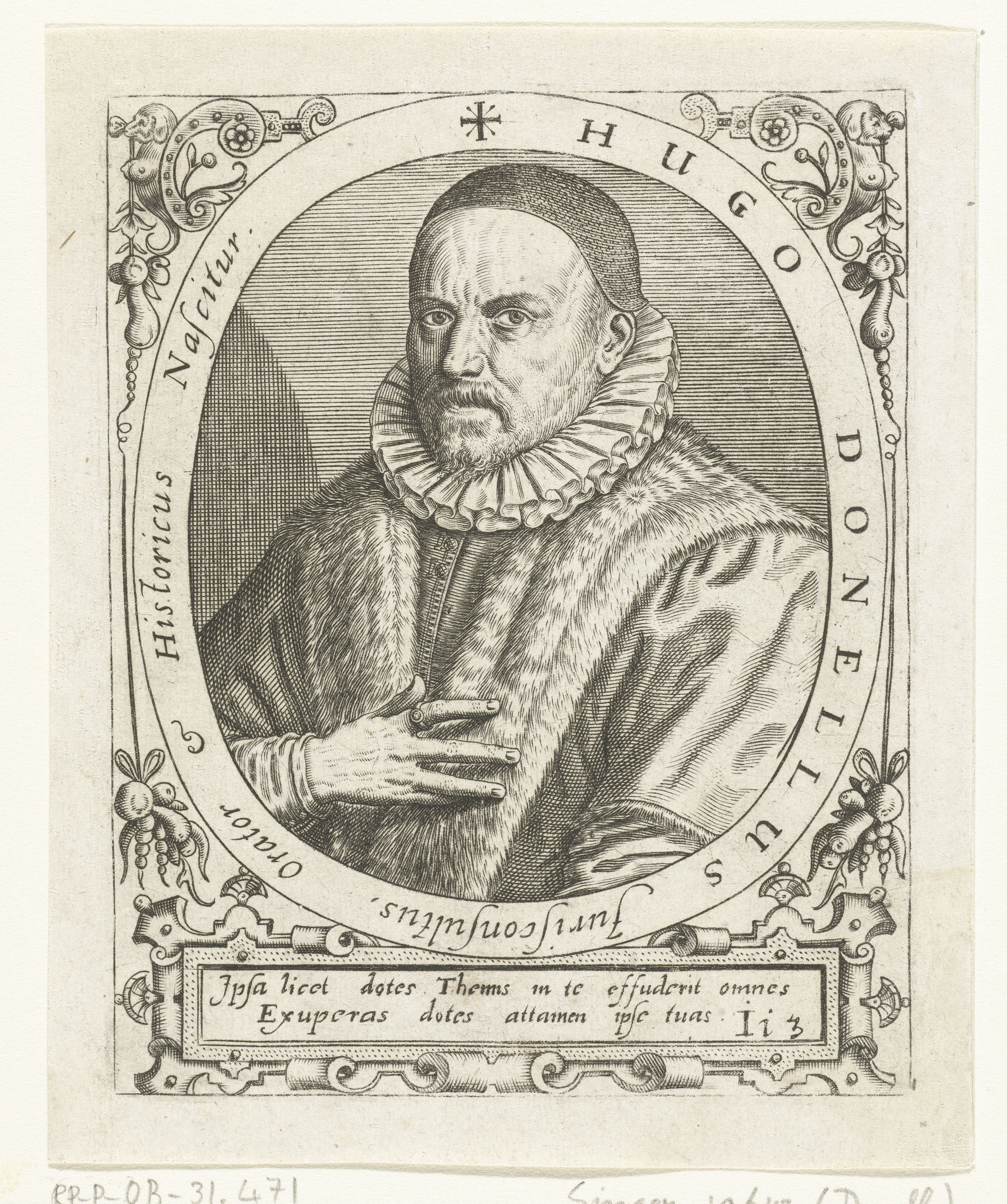
- Hugues Doneau
- Born: 1527; Chalon-sur-Saône
- Died: 1591 (aged 63–64); Altdorf bei Nürnberg
- Known for: Systematic analysis of the Corpus Juris Civilis
- Scientific career
- Fields: Civil law
- Workplaces: University of Bourges, Heidelberg University, University of Leiden, Altdorf Academy

Hugues Doneau, commonly referred also by the Latin form Hugo Donellus (23 December 1527, in Chalon-sur-Saône – 4 May 1591, in Altdorf bei Nürnberg), was a French law professor and one of the leading representatives of French legal humanism (mos Gallicus).

== Life ==
Doneau, who was born into a well-respected family, studied law in Toulouse and Bourges. Bourges was then a center of legal humanism and François Douaren (Franciscus Duarenus), one of the most famous members of this movement was among Doneau's teachers at Bourges. In 1551, Doneau received a doctorate from the University of Bourges and began teaching there. However, because of his Calvinist confession, Doneau had to flee to Geneva after the St. Bartholomew's Day massacre in 1572. Doneau accepted a call from the Reformed Elector Palatine Frederick III to a professorship at Heidelberg and assumed the post in early 1573. Doneau, however, would have to relocate again in 1579 because Heidelberg and the surrounding Electoral Palatinate were converted to the Lutheran confession by Frederick's successor Louis VI (r. 1576–83), and the elector required subscription to the Formula of Concord. Doneau then moved to the newly founded Leiden, but in 1587, the political circumstances forced him into exile for the third time: Doneau had to leave Leiden in 1588, because of his sympathies for Robert Dudley, 1st Earl of Leicester. Doneau returned to Germany and became professor of law at the Altdorf Academy (the university of the Free Imperial City of Nuremberg). He died in Altdorf in 1591.

Doneau was one of the French jurists who followed the example of Andrea Alciato (Andreas Alciatus) and applied the methods of Renaissance humanism to law. However, while many of the followers of this so-called mos Gallicus (French method) concentrated on a critical evaluation of the texts in the Corpus Iuris Civilis, Doneau was more interested in the construction of a coherent system of law. His best known work Commentarii de iure civili (commentaries on the civil law) (in part edited posthumously by Scipione Gentili) is one of the first attempts to organise the subject matter of Roman law in a logical order rather than according to the sequence of the books and titles of the Digest. Doneau also made major contributions to various specialised areas of law such as the doctrine of possession and acquisition of ownership.

== Works ==
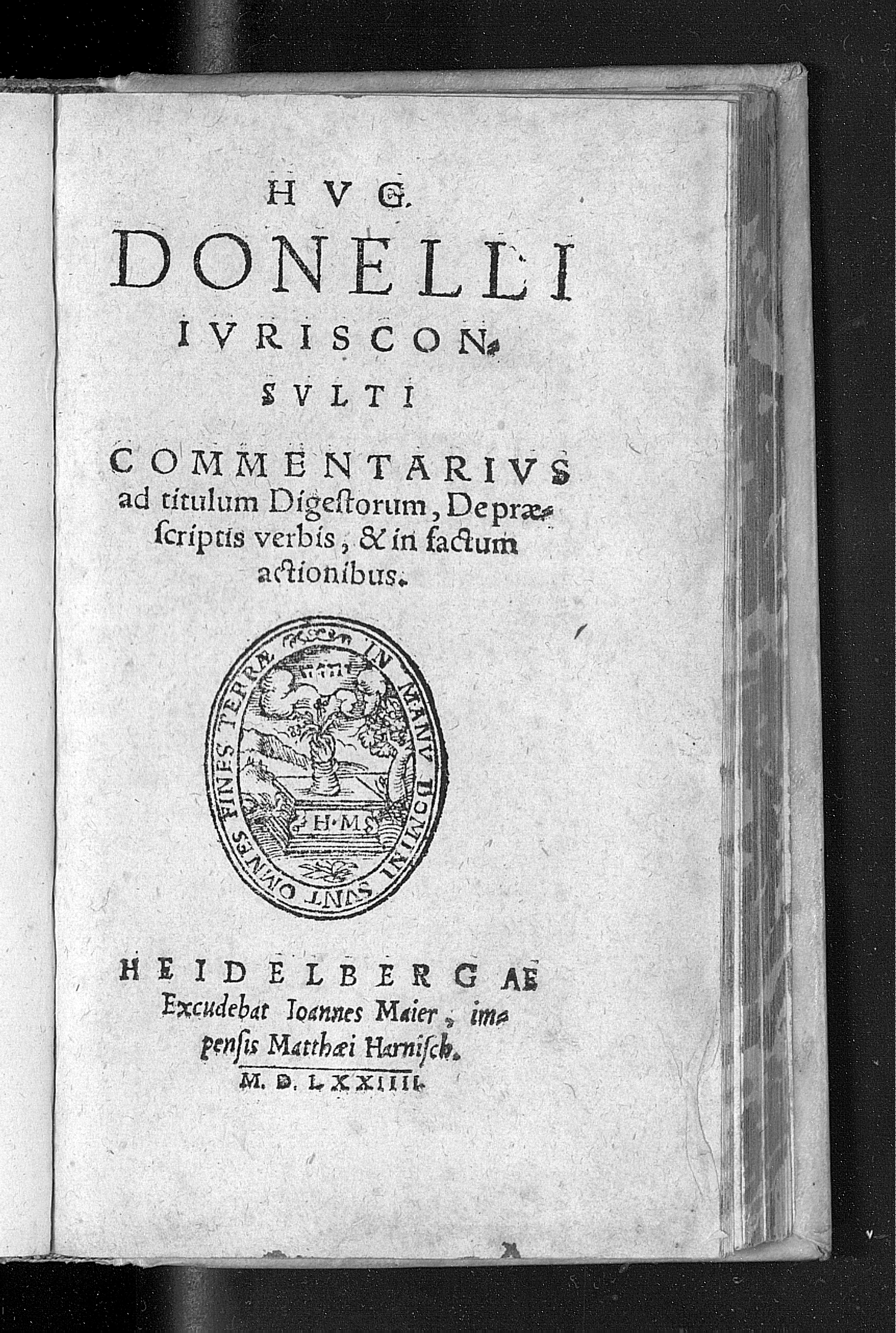
Commentarius ad titulum Digestorum De praescriptis verbis et in factum actionibus, 1574

- Commentaria in tit. Pandectarum de usuris, nautico fonere, de fructibus, causa et accessionibus et de mora, Paris 1556
  - Commentaria in titulos Padectarum de usuris, nautico fonere, de fructibus, causa et accessionibus et de mora (in Latin). Paris: apud Gulielmum Rouillium. 1558.
- Ad legem Justiniani de sententiis quae pro eo quod interset proferuntur, sive de eo quod interest, liber Paris 1561, Neustadt 1580, Altdorf 1589, also published as a Donello recognitus (Ap. Carterium 1596, Leiden 1630)
  - Ad legem Iustiniani de sententiis, quae pro eo, quod interest, proferuntur (in Latin). 1630.
- Commentaria Ad tit. Dig. De rebus dubiis, Bouges 1571, Antwerp 1584
- Commentaria Ad tit. Cod. De pactis et transactt., Bouges 1572, Paris 1573, Colonia 1574
- Zachariae Furnestri Defensio pro justo et innocente tot millium animarum sanguine in Gallia effuso adversus Molucii calumnias, 1573, 1579
- Commentarius ad titulum Digestorum De praescriptis verbis et in factum actionibus (in Latin). Heidelberg: Heinrich Mayer, Matthaeus Harnisch. 1574.
- Commentaria ad tit. Inst. De actionibus, Antwerp 1581, 1596, 1620
- Tractatus de pignoribus et hypothecis, Frankfurt
- Tractatus de aedilitio edicto, evictionibus, et duplae stipulatione, de probationibus, fide instrumentorum et testibus, Frankfurt
- Commentaria Ad tit. Dig de rebus creditis seu munto, de jurejurando, de in litem jurando, condictione ex lege, triticiaria, et de eo quod certo loco, Antwerp 1582, Frankfurt 1626
- Commentaria Ad Codicis Justinianei partes quasdam, 1587
  - Commentarii in codicem Iustiniani (in Latin). Vol. 1. Lucca. 1765.
  - Commentarii in codicem Iustiniani (in Latin). Vol. 3. 1766.
- Commentaria Ad tit. Digestorum de diversis regulis juris, Antwerp
- Commentaria Ad tit. Dig. De Verborum obligationibus, Frankfurt 1599
- Commentarium de jure civili viginti octo, in quibus jus civile universum singulari artificatio atque doctrina explicatum continetur, Frankfurt 1595, 1596
- Hugonis Donelli opera postuma et aliorum quaedam, ex biblotheca Sciponis Gentilis, Hannover 1604
- Opera cur. e Barth. Franc. Pellegrini, published together in Luzern 1762–1770 in 12 volumes.
  - [Works] (in Latin). Vol. 12. 1770.
- Commentarii de iuri civili
  - Commentarii de iuri civili (in Latin). Vol. 2. 1763.
  - Commentarii de iuri civili (in Latin). Vol. 3. Lucca. 1763.
  - Commentarii de iuri civili (in Latin). Vol. 4. 1764.
  - Commentarii de iuri civili (in Latin). Vol. 6. 1764.
- Commentarii in selectos quosdam titulos Digestorum
  - Commentarii in selectos quosdam titulos Digestorum (in Latin). Vol. 1. 1766.
  - Commentarii in selectos quosdam titulos Digestorum (in Latin). Vol. 2. 1767.
