= Giorgio Biandrata =

Italian-born Transylvanian physician

- Born: c. 1515
- Died: Alba Iulia

Giorgio Biandrata or Blandrata (1515 – 5 May 1588) was an Italian-born Transylvanian physician and polemicist, who came from the De Biandrate family, powerful from the early part of the 13th century. He was an antitrinitarian.

Biandrata was born in Saluzzo, the youngest son of Bernardino Biandrata. He graduated in arts and medicine at Montpellier in 1533, and specialized in the functional and nervous disorders of women. In 1544 he made his first trip to Transylvania; in 1553 he was with Giovanni Paolo Alciati in the Grisons; in 1557 he spent a year at Geneva, in constant contact with Calvin, who distrusted him.

He attended Jane Stafford, English wife of Count Celso Massimiliano Martinengo, preacher of the Italian church at Geneva, and fostered anti-trinitarian opinions in that church. In 1558, he found it expedient to move to Poland, where he became a leader of the heretical party at the synods of Pińczów (1558) and Książ Wielkopolski (1560 and 1562). His point was the suppression of extremes of opinion, on the basis of a confession literally drawn from Scripture.

He obtained the position of court physician to the queen dowager, the Milanese Bona Sforza. She had been instrumental in the burning (1539) of Catharine Weygel, at the age of 80, for anti-trinitarian opinions; but the writings of Ochino had altered her views, which were now anti-Catholic.

In 1563, Biandrata transferred his services to the Transylvanian court of John Sigismund Zápolya, where the daughters of his patroness were married to ruling princes. He revisited Poland (1576) in the train of Stephen Báthory, whose tolerance permitted the propagation of heresies; and when (1579) Christopher Báthory introduced the Jesuits into Transylvania, Biandrata found means of conciliating them.

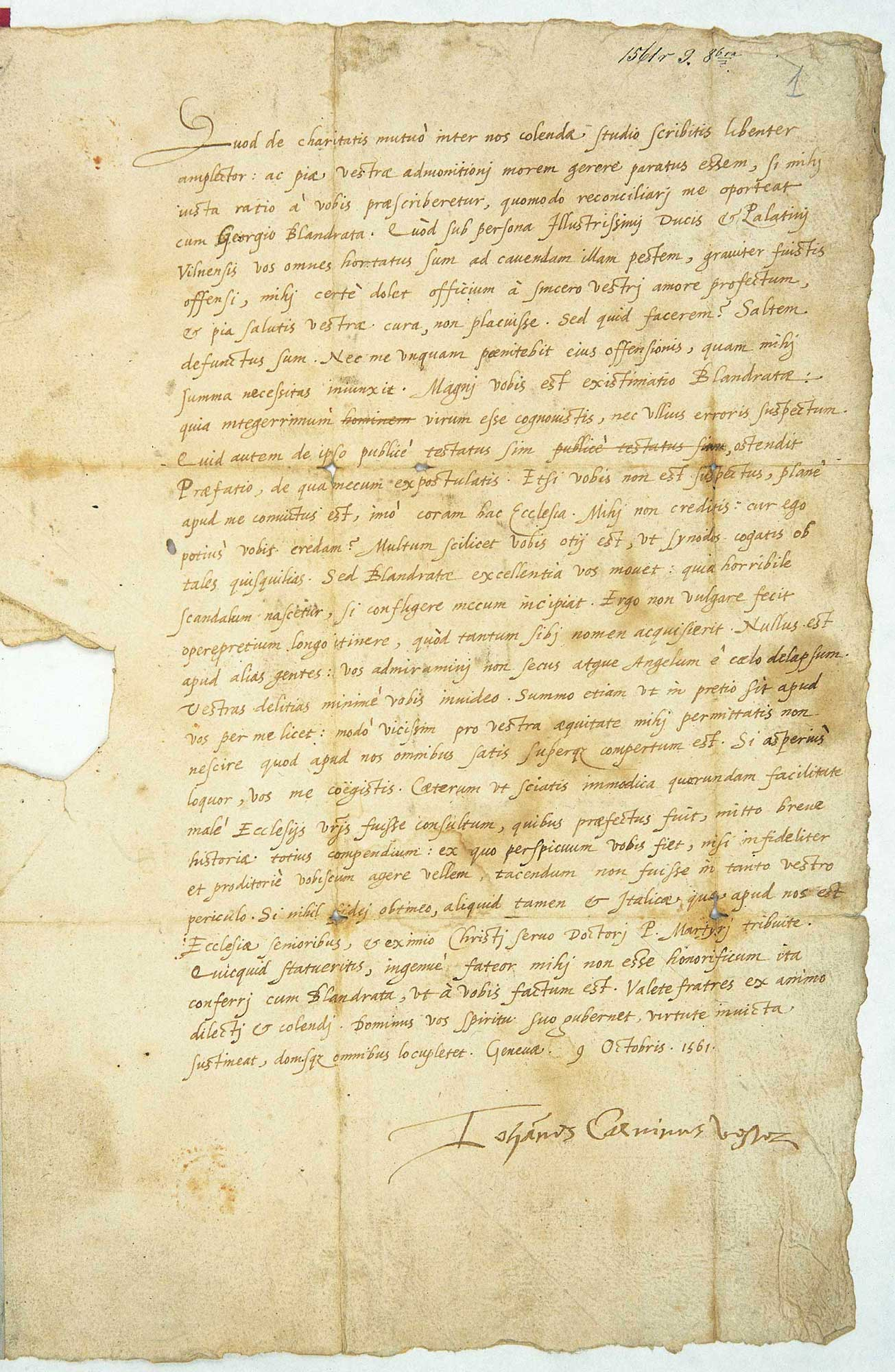
John Calvin letter to the Calvinist congress in Vilnius, including condemnation of Giorgio Blandrata's anti-trinitarian views, 9 October 1561, Geneva

Throughout his career, he was accompanied by his two brothers, Ludovico and Alphonso, the former being canon of Saluzzo. In Transylvania, Biandrata co-operated with Francis David (d. 1579), the leader of the Calvinist church, who then became the first anti-trinitarian bishop. Together, they published some polemical writings against Trinitarian belief, particularly De falsa et vera unius Dei Patris, Filii et Spiritus Sancti cognitione, which is largely a summarized version of Servetus's Christianismi Restitutio. But in 1578 two circumstances broke the connection. Biandrata was charged with immorality and David renounced the necessity of invoking Christ in prayer.

To influence David, Biandrata sent for Faustus Socinus from Basel. Socinus was David's guest, but the discussion between them led to no result. At the instance of Biandrata, David was tried and condemned to prison at the Fortress of Deva on the charge of "innovation", where he died.

Having amassed a fortune, Biandrata returned to the communion of Rome. His end is obscure. According to the Jesuit, Jakub Wujek, he was strangled by a nephew (Giorgio, son of Alphonso) at Gyulafehérvár, in May 1588.

Gary W. Jenkins calls Biandrata the "tritheist apostle to the Poles," and suggests that Valentine Gentili was his Silas.
