= Bernardino Ochino =

Italian theologian (1487–1564)

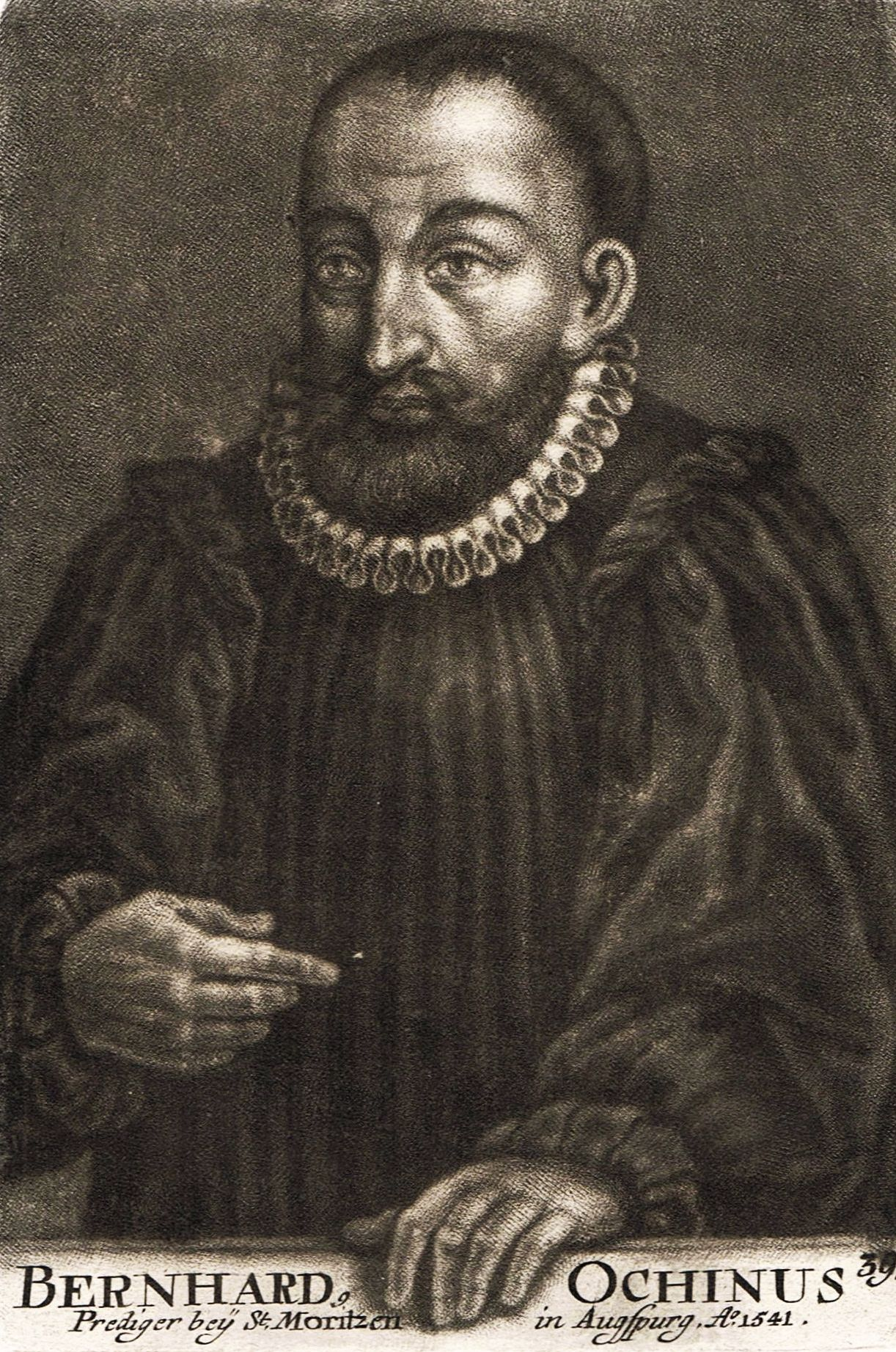
Portrait by an unknown author, 1748

Bernardino Ochino (1487–1564) was an Italian, who was raised a Roman Catholic and later turned to Protestantism and became a Protestant reformer.

== Biography ==
Bernardino Ochino was born in Siena, the son of the barber Domenico Ochino, and at the age of 7 or 8, in around 1504, was entrusted to the order of Franciscan Friars. From 1510 he studied medicine at Perugia.

=== Transfer to the Capuchins ===
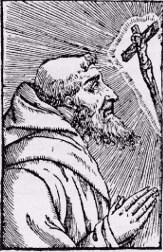
Bernardino Ochino in a 16th-century engraving.

At the age of 38, Ochino transferred himself in 1534 to the newly founded Order of Friars Minor Capuchin. By then he was the close friend of Juan de Valdés, Pietro Bembo, Vittoria Colonna, Pietro Martire, and Carnesecchi. In 1538 he was elected vicar-general of his order. In 1539, urged by Bembo, he visited Venice and delivered a course of sermons showing a sympathy with justification by faith, which appeared more clearly in his Dialogues published the same year. He was suspected and denounced, but nothing ensued until the establishment of the Inquisition in Rome in June 1542, at the instigation of Cardinal Giovanni Pietro Carafa. Ochino received a citation to Rome, and set out to obey it about the middle of August. According to his own statement, he was deterred from presenting himself at Rome by the warnings of Cardinal Contarini, whom he found at Bologna, allegedly dying of poison administered by the reactionary party.

=== Escape to Geneva ===
Ochino turned aside to Florence, and after some hesitation went across the Alps to Geneva. He was cordially received by John Calvin, and published within two years several volumes of Prediche, controversial tracts rationalizing his change of religion. He also addressed replies to marchioness Vittoria Colonna, Claudio Tolomei, and other Italian sympathizers who were reluctant to go to the same length as himself. His own breach with the Roman Catholic Church was final.

=== Augsburg and England ===
In 1545 Ochino became minister of the Italian Protestant congregation at Augsburg. From this time dates his contact with Caspar Schwenckfeld. In 1546 he participated in the anti-Trinitarian Collegia Vicentina. He was compelled to flee from Augsburg when, in January 1547, the city was occupied by the imperial forces for the Diet of Augsburg.

Ochino found asylum in England, where he was made a prebendary of Canterbury Cathedral, received a pension from Edward VI's privy purse, and composed his major work, the Tragoedie or Dialoge of the unjuste usurped primacie of the Bishop of Rome. This text, originally written in Latin, is extant only in the 1549 translation of Bishop John Ponet. The form is a series of dialogues. Lucifer, enraged at the spread of Jesus's kingdom, convokes the fiends in council, and resolves to set up the pope as antichrist. The state, represented by the emperor Phocas, is persuaded to connive at the pope's assumption of spiritual authority; the other churches are intimidated into acquiescence; Lucifer's projects seem fully accomplished, when Heaven raises up Henry VIII of England and his son for their overthrow.

Several of Ochino's Prediche were translated into English by Anna Cooke; and he published numerous controversial treatises on the Continent. Ochino's Che Cosa è Christo was translated into Latin and English by the future Queen Elizabeth I of England in 1547.

=== Zürich ===
In 1553 the accession of Mary I drove Ochino from England. He went to Basel, where Lelio Sozzini and the lawyer Martino Muralto were sent to secure Ochino as pastor of the Italian church at Zurich, which Ochino accepted. The Italian congregation there was composed mainly of refugees from Locarno. There for 10 years Ochino wrote books which gave increasing evidence of his alienation from the orthodoxy around him. The most important of these was the Labyrinth, a discussion of the freedom of the will, covertly undermining the Calvinistic doctrine of predestination.

In 1563 a long simmering storm burst on Ochino with the publication of his Thirty Dialogues, in one of which his adversaries maintained that he had justified polygamy under the disguise of a pretended refutation. His dialogues on divorce and against the Trinity were also considered heretical.

=== Poland, and death ===
Ochino was not given opportunity to defend himself, and was banished from Zürich. After being refused admission by other Protestant cities, he directed his steps towards Poland, at that time the most tolerant state in Europe. He had not resided there long when an edict appeared (August 8, 1564) banishing all foreign dissidents. Fleeing the country, he encountered the plague at Pińczów; three of his four children were carried off; and he himself, worn out by misfortune, died in solitude and obscurity at Slavkov in Moravia, about the end of 1564.

== Legacy ==
Ochino's reputation among Protestants was low. He was charged by Thomas Browne in 1643 with the authorship of the legendary-apocryphal heretical treatise De tribus Impostoribus, as well as with having carried his alleged approval of polygamy into practice.

His biographer Karl Benrath justified him, representing him as a fervent evangelist and at the same time as a speculative thinker with a passion for free inquiry. The picture is of Ochino always learning and unlearning and arguing out difficult questions with himself in his dialogues, frequently without attaining to any absolute conviction.

== Works ==
- Prediche (1542)
- Epistola alli Signori di Balia della città di Siena (1543)
- Responsio ad Marcum Brixiensem Abbatem Ordinis S. Benedicti (Geneva, 1543)
- Responsio ad Mutium Justinopolitanum to Girolamo Muzio (1496–1576)
- Tragoedie or Dialoge of the unjuste usurped primacie of the Bishop of Rome. 1549 translation of Bishop John Ponet.
- Disputa intorno alla presenza del corpo di Cristo nel Sacramento della Cena
- Labyrinth – Laberinti del libero arbitrio (1563) dedicated to Elisabeth I
- Dialogi XXX (1563)
- Prediche
