= Lelio Sozzini =

Italian theologian and co-founder of Socinianism (1525–1562)

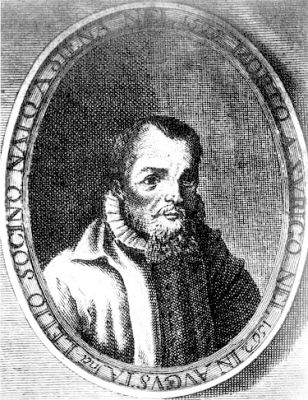
Lelio Sozzini

Lelio Francesco Maria Sozzini (Italian: [ˈlɛːljo franˈtʃesko maˈriːa sotˈtsiːni]; 29 January 1525 – 4 May 1562), often known in English by his Latinized name Laelius Socinus (/ˈliːliəs soʊˈsaɪnəs/ LEE-lee-əs soh-SY-nəs), was an Italian Renaissance humanist and theologian, and, alongside his nephew Fausto Sozzini, founder of the Nontrinitarian Christian belief system known as Socinianism. His doctrine was developed among the Polish Brethren in the Polish Reformed Church between the 16th and 17th centuries, and embraced by the Unitarian Church of Transylvania during the same period.

== Life ==
Lelio Sozzini was born and raised in Siena, capital city of the Republic of Siena. His family descended from Sozzo, a banker at Percenna (Buonconvento), whose second son, Mino Sozzi, settled as a notary at Siena in 1304. Mino Sozzi's grandson, Sozzino (d. 1403), was the founder of a line of patrician jurists and canonists, Mariano Sozzini the Elder (1397–1467) being the first and the most famous, and traditionally regarded as the first freethinker in the Sozzini family.

Lelio (who spelled his surname Sozzini, Latinized as Socinus) was the sixth son of Mariano Sozzini the Younger (1482–1556) by his wife Camilla Salvetti, and was educated as a jurist under his father's eye at Bologna. He told Philipp Melanchthon that his desire to reach the fontes juris led him to Biblical research, and hence to rejection of "the idolatry of Rome".

Lelio Sozzini gained some knowledge of Hebrew and Arabic (he gave a manuscript of the Quran to Bibliander) as well as Greek, but was never a laborious student. His father supplied him with means and, on coming of age, he repaired to the Republic of Venice, home to the headquarters of the Protestant churches in medieval Italy. A tradition—first published by Christopher Sandius in his book Bibliotheca antitrinitariorum (1684) and Andrzej Wiszowaty in his book Narratio Compendiosa (1668)—and amplified by subsequent writers makes him a leading spirit in theological conferences called the Collegia Vicentina at Vicenza between the years 1546 and 1547.

At this period, the standpoint of Sozzini was that of evangelical reform of the Christian faith; he exhibits a singular union of enthusiastic piety with subtle theological speculation. At Chiavenna in 1547 he came under the influence of Paolo Ricci "Camillo Renato" of Sicily, a gentle Christian mystic whose teaching at many points resembled that of the early Quakers. Pursuing his religious travels throughout early modern Europe, his family name and his personal charm ensured him a welcome in the Old Swiss Confederacy, the kingdoms of France and England, and the Republic of the Netherlands.

=== 1548–1554 ===
Returning to Switzerland at the close of 1548, with commendatory letters to the Swiss Protestant churches from Nicolas Meyer, envoy from Wittenberg to Italy, we find him at Geneva, Basel (with Sebastian Münster), and Zürich (lodging with Konrad Pelikan) between the years 1549–1550. He was next at Wittenberg (July 1550–June 1551), first as Melanchthon's guest, then with professor Johann Forster, for the improvement of his knowledge of Hebrew. From Wittenberg he returned to Zürich (end of 1551), after visiting Vienna in the Holy Roman Empire, then Prague and Kraków in the Polish–Lithuanian Commonwealth.

Political events drew him back to Italy in June 1552; with two visits to Siena. In the Republic of Siena, freedom of speech was for the moment possible, owing to the siege of Siena (1552–1559) and shaking off of the Spanish yoke. This brought him into contact with his young nephew Fausto. Lelio was at Padua (not Geneva, as is often said) at the date of Michael Servetus's execution (27 October 1553), burned at the stake with the accusation of heresy. Thence he made his way to Basel (January 1554), Geneva (April), and Zürich (May), where he took up his abode.

John Calvin, like Melanchthon, received Sozzini with open arms. Melanchthon (though a phrase in one of his letters has been strangely misconstrued) never regarded him with theological suspicion. To Calvin's keen glance Sozzini's over-speculative tendency and the genuineness of his religious nature were equally apparent. A passage often quoted (apart from the context) in one of Calvin's letters (1 January 1552) has been viewed as a rapture of amicable intercourse; but, while more than once uneasy apprehensions arose in Calvin's mind, there was no breach of correspondence or of kindliness. Of all the Protestant Reformers, Heinrich Bullinger was Sozzini's closest intimate, his warmest and wisest friend. Sozzini's theological difficulties turned on the resurrection of the body, predestination, the ground of salvation (on these points he corresponded with Calvin), the doctrinal basis of the original gospel (his queries to Bullinger), the nature of repentance (to Rudolph Gualther), and the sacraments (to Johann Wolff). It was the fate of the Spanish theologian Michael Servetus that directed his mind to focus on the doctrine of the Trinity.

At Geneva (April 1554) he made, incautious remarks on the common doctrine, emphasized in a subsequent letter to Martinengo, the Italian pastor. Bullinger, at the instance of correspondents (including Calvin), questioned Sozzini as to his faith, and received from him an explicitly orthodox confession (reduced to writing on 15 July 1555), with a frank reservation of the right of further inquiry.

A month before this Sozzini had been sent with Martino Muralto to Basel, to secure Ochino as pastor of the Italian church at Zürich; and it is clear that in their subsequent intercourse the minds of Sozzini and Ochino (a thinker of the same type as Camillo, with finer dialectic skill) acted powerfully on each other in the radical discussion of theological problems.

=== 1555–1562 ===
In 1555, Lelio turned 30 years old. From 1556 following the death of his father, who left him nothing by will, Sozzini was involved in pecuniary anxieties. With influential introductions (one from Calvin) he visited in 1558 the courts of Vienna and Kraków to obtain support for an appeal to the reigning duke at Florence for the realization of his own and the family estates. Melanchthon's letter introducing Sozzini to Maximilian II invokes as an historic parallel the hospitable reception rendered by the Emperor Constantine to Athanasius when he fled from Egypt to Trier.

Well received out of Italy, Sozzini could do nothing at home, and apparently did not proceed beyond Venice. The Inquisition had its eye on the family; his brother Cornelio Sozzini was imprisoned at Rome; his brothers Celso Sozzini and Camillo and his nephew Fausto were "reputati Luterani," suspected of Lutheranism, and Camillo Sozzini had fled from Siena. In August 1559 Sozzini returned to Zürich, where his brief career was closed by his death on 4 May 1562, at his lodging in the house of Hans Wyss, a silk-weaver.

== Legacy ==
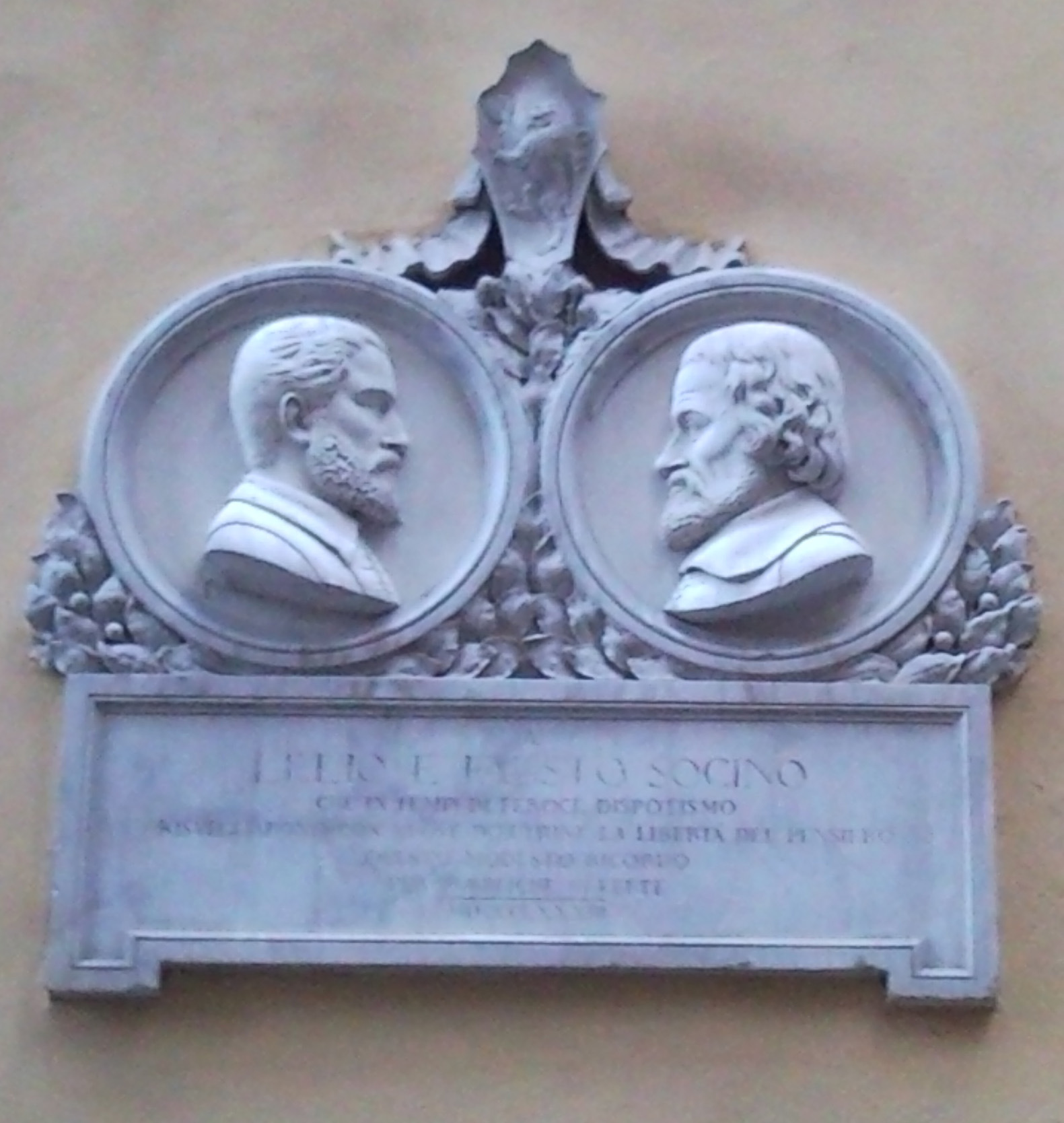
Plaque in the Sozzini's palace in Siena to remember Fausto and Lelio Socini. The inscription say: "During ages of fierce despotism, with their new doctrines they awoke the free thought"

No authentic portrait of him exists; alleged likenesses on medals, etc., are spurious. The news of his uncle's death reached Fausto at Lyons through Antonio Maria Besozzo. Repairing to Zürich Fausto got his uncle's few papers, comprising very little connected writing but a good many notes.

Fausto continually gave credit to his uncle for many of his ideas, in particular noting:

1. Fausto derived from Lelio in conversations (1552–1553) the germ of his theory of salvation;
2. Fausto derived many interpretations of specific Bible verses from Lelio. For example, Lelio's reading (1561) of "In the Beginning" in John 1:1 as "the beginning of the gospel" was taken up in Fausto's interpretation which denied the pre-existence of Christ. Likewise Lelio's interpretation of "Before Abraham was I am" John 8:58 as relating to the resurrection of Abraham was taken up by Fausto.

== Works ==
Sozzini’s extant writings are:

- De sacramentis dissertatio (1555), On the sacrament. four parts
- De resurrectione On resurrection (a fragment 1549?)
- Brevis explicatio in primum Iohannis caput Short explanation of John 1. published posthumously by Ferenc David in De falsa et vera unius Dei Patri, filii, et spiritus sancti 1568, Alba Iulia. This is often confused with the similarly titled Brevis explicatio in primum Iohannis caput (Amsterdam 1565)
- Confessio Fidei (Zurich July 1555)

An extensive correspondence in Latin and Italian exists, consisting of 53 letters from and to Sozzini with Bullinger, Calvin and B. Amerbach.

== See also ==
- Arianism
- Catholic Inquisition
- English Dissenters
- Heresy in Christianity
- History of Christian theology
- Polish Brethren
- Racovian Catechism
- Remonstrants
- Unitarianism
