= 1563 in literature =

| List of years in literature | (table) |
- … 1553; 1554; 1555; 1556; 1557; 1558; 1559; 1560; 1561; 1562; 1563; 1564; 1565; 1566; 1567; 1568; 1569; 1570; 1571; 1572; 1573 …
- Art; Archaeology; Architecture; Literature; Music; Philosophy; Science; +...

This article contains information about the literary events and publications of 1563.

== Events ==
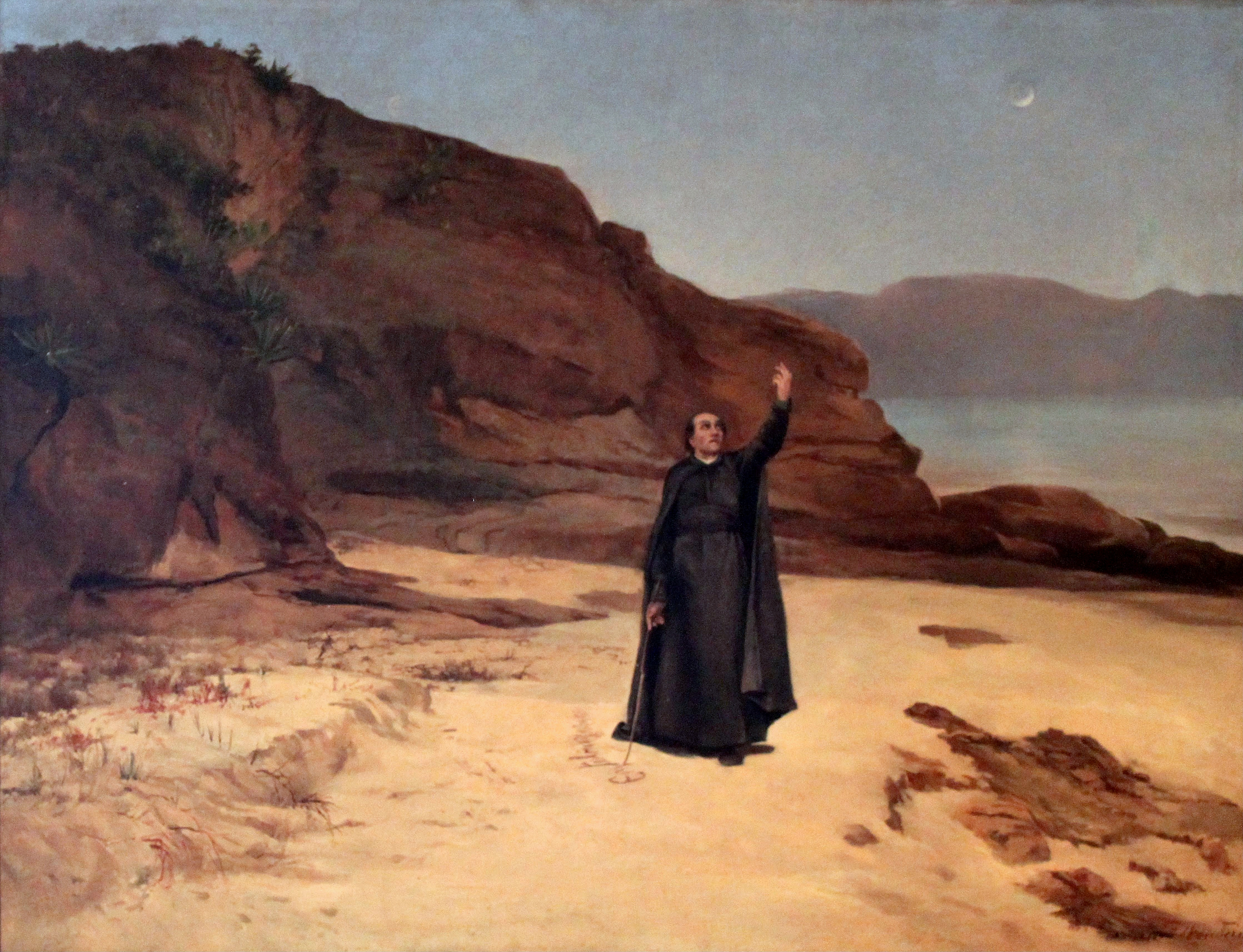
José de Anchieta composing De Beata Virgine Dei Matre, as pictured by Firmino Monteiro

- February 12–14 – The French poet Pierre de Bocosel de Chastelard is twice caught hiding under the bed of Mary, Queen of Scots – at Holyrood and then at Rossend. He is arrested by the Earl of Moray on his second attempt and executed at St Andrews Castle on February 22.
- March 27 – As part of the English Reformation, the House of Commons passes legislation approving Bible translations into Welsh. This allows Henry Denham to publish his Welsh New Testament in 1567.
- c. April – A year into the French Wars of Religion, Pierre de Ronsard composes two defenses of French Catholicism against the Huguenots. On the Huguenot side, anonymous leaflets parody his "remonstrance" genre until a ban on libels is placed by Charles IX of France.
- April – As a hostage at Iperoig in Tupi territory, José de Anchieta composes De Beata Virgine Dei Matre (The Blessed Virgin Mary), a devotional poem that is among the early accomplishments in Brazilian literature.
- April 3 – From the Electoral Palatinate, Caspar Olevian reports to John Calvin that the Heidelberg Catechism will be ready "by next market day". The contributors, including Olevian, Zacharias Ursinus, and Calvin himself, are not mentioned in print, "so that the Germans would not refuse to read it."
- May – The Ottoman poet and historian Mustafa Âlî accepts a post in Aleppo Eyalet. On his way there he visits his mentor, Ramazanoğlu Piri Mehmet Paşa, in Adana.
- June 27 – Gómez Suárez de Figueroa fails to return to his native Peru from Seville. After November, he begins signing his name Garcilaso de la Vega, a step toward Inca Garcilaso de la Vega, his literary signature.
- August – Michel de Montaigne writes a letter to his father describing the death of his friend Étienne de La Boétie.
- c. September/November – In the Grand Duchy of Lithuania, Mikołaj "the Black" Radziwiłł commissions the Brest Bible from various translators, as the first complete translation into Polish. It becomes the standard edition for the Polish Lutheran and Reformed churches.
- November 5 – Outside Suceava, Moldavia, Prince Iacob Heraclid, a Renaissance humanist, is lynched by crowds after a siege; the rival pretender, Ștefan Tomșa, probably delivers the first blow.
- December – Primož Trubar of the South Slavic Bible Institute draws up a plan to sustain the Reformation in Italy with translations from Martin Luther.
- December 4 – The closure of the Council of Trent marks the official start of the Counter-Reformation and encouragement of artistic Mannerism, which sometimes extended to literature. Though its full impact is delayed to 1587, it is visible in the Republic of Venice: by 1567, most books put out by Gabriele Giolito de' Ferrari are devotional.
- At Basel in the Old Swiss Confederacy, the Dutch physician Johann Weyer publishes De praestigiis daemonum, with its rationalist interpretation of witchcraft. It proposes that accused witches are "deluded victims" rather than instruments of the Devil. Though rejected by "witch-hunters", De praestigiis sells well and will inspire Reginald Scot's refutation of magic. Also in Basel, Pietro Perna prints Bernardino Ochino's Dialogi XXX (Thirty Dialogues) criticizing the Radical Reformation. Their apparent preaching of polygamy is used against him by the Daig, causing him and his family to be banished from the city.
- John Foxe's Actes and Monuments, known later as Foxe's Book of Martyrs, becomes "the most influential book" of the Elizabethan era "upon the formation of English Protestant identity and nationhood."
- Printing is brought to Goa and Portuguese India, probably by the Society of Jesus, producing Garcia de Orta's Colóquios dos simples e drogas da India. With its rhyming preface by Luís de Camões, it is "the third [book] in a European language to be printed in Asia."
- The future John of the Cross is tonsured a Carmelite at Medina del Campo in the Crown of Castile.
- In the Kingdom of Poland, Stanisław Orzechowski publishes Rozmowa, albo Dyjalog około egzekucyjej polskiej korony (Conversation, or a Dialogue about Government of the Polish Crown), with allegorical engravings and designs resembling hieroglyphs. It defends the Catholic Church in Poland as an ideal political model, so marking Orzechowski's own transition from Lutheranism.

== New books ==
=== Prose ===
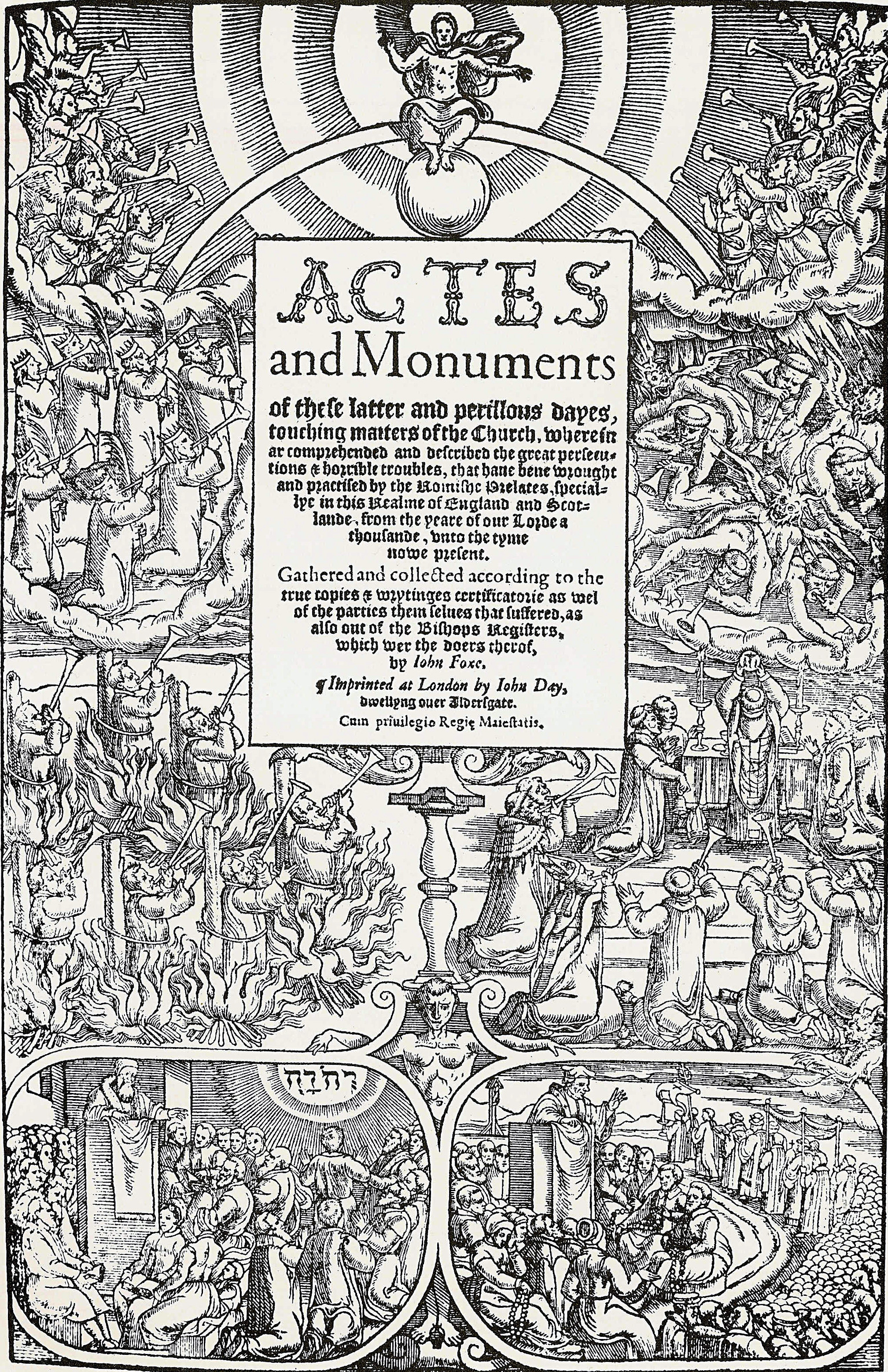
Title page of Actes and Monuments, first edition

- Brest Bible
- Heidelberg Catechism
- Ten Articles of Religion
- João de Barros – Terceira Década da Ásia (Third Decade of Asia)
- Pierino Belli – De re militari et de bello (On Military Matters and on War)
- Francesco Cattani da Diacceto – Opera omnia (posthumous)
- Coresi – Apostolul românesc (Apostolos in Romanian)
- John Foxe – Actes and Monuments
- Richard Grafton – Abridgement of the Chronicles of England
- Joseph Karo – Shulchan Aruch
- Bernardino Ochino – Dialogi XXX (Thirty Dialogues)
- Garcia de Orta – Colóquios dos simples e drogas da India
- Stanisław Orzechowski – Rozmowa, albo Dyjalog około egzekucyjej polskiej korony (Conversation, or a Dialogue about the Government of the Polish Crown)
- Pierre Viret – Les Cauteles et canon de la Messe (The Cautels, Canons, and Ceremonies)
- Johann Weyer – De praestigiis daemonum

=== Poetry ===
- José de Anchieta – De Beata Virgine Dei Matre (The Blessed Virgin Mary)
- Barnaby Googe – Eclogues, Epitaphs, and Sonnets
- Klemens Janicki
  - Vitae regum Polonorum (The Lives of Polish Kings, posthumous)
  - In Polonici vestitus varietatem et inconstantiam dialogus (A Dialogue against the Diversity and Changeability of Polish Dress, posthumous)
- Dinko Ranjina – Pjesni razlike (Various Poems)
- Pierre de Ronsard
  - Remonstrance au peuple de France (Remonstrance to the People of France)
  - Responce aux injures et calomnies, de je ne sçay quels predicans et ministres de Geneve (Response to the Insults and Calumnies of Some Preachers and Ministers of Geneva)

== Births ==
- January 6 – Martin Becanus, Flemish Catholic theologian and polemicist (died 1624)
- January 19 – Leonhard Hutter, German Lutheran theologian (died 1616)
- January 30 – Franciscus Gomarus, Dutch Calvinist theologian (died 1641)
- April 15 – Guru Arjan, Sikh Guru and compiler of scriptures (died 1606)
- June 30 – Silvestre de Balboa, Canarian and Cuban poet (died c. 1647)
- July 16 – Manuel Godinho de Erédia, Portuguese and Malay historian (died 1623)
- August 14 – Johannes Malderus, Flemish Catholic theologian (died 1633)
- November 11 – Martinus Smiglecius, Polish logician, Catholic theologian, and economist (died 1618)
- November 28 – Hosokawa Tadaoki, Japanese samurai and poet (died 1646)
- December 19 – William Howard, English antiquarian and publisher (died 1640)
- Unknown dates
  - Abdias Assheton, English historian and biographer (died 1633)
  - William Baldwin, English Catholic theologian (died 1632)
  - Louise Bourgeois Boursier, French midwife and essayist (died 1636)
  - Theophilos Corydalleus, Greek philosopher and translator (died 1646)
  - Henry Cuffe, English translator and poet (died 1601)
  - Matija Divković, Bosnian Catholic theologian and printer (died 1631)
  - Michael Drayton, English poet (died 1631)
  - Scipione Gentili, Italian-born legal scholar, translator, and critic (died 1616)
  - Heo Nanseolheon, Korean poet (died 1589)
  - Jan Huyghen van Linschoten, Dutch historian and travel writer (died 1611)
  - Naw'i Khabushani, Indo-Persian poet (died 1610)
  - Christoph Knoll, Silesian-born Lutheran theologian and poet (died 1630)
  - Pierre Matthieu, French poet and dramatist (died 1621)
  - Adriaan van Meerbeeck, Flemish historian and translator (died 1627)
  - Valeria Miani, Paduan playwright (died 1620)
  - Robert Naunton, English politician and historian (died 1635)
  - Mavro Orbini, Ragusan chronicler (died 1614)
  - Thomas Preston, English Catholic theologian and polemicist (died c. 1640)
  - John Ross of the Inner Temple, English poet (died 1607)
  - John Stradling, English poet and translator (died 1637)
  - Josuah Sylvester, English poet (died 1618)
  - Daniel Tilenus, Silesian-born Arminian theologian (died 1633)
  - Clemens Timpler, German philosopher (died 1624)
  - Yi Su-gwang, Korean encyclopedist (died 1628)
- Approximate year – Robert Armin, English actor and comic author (died 1615)

== Deaths ==
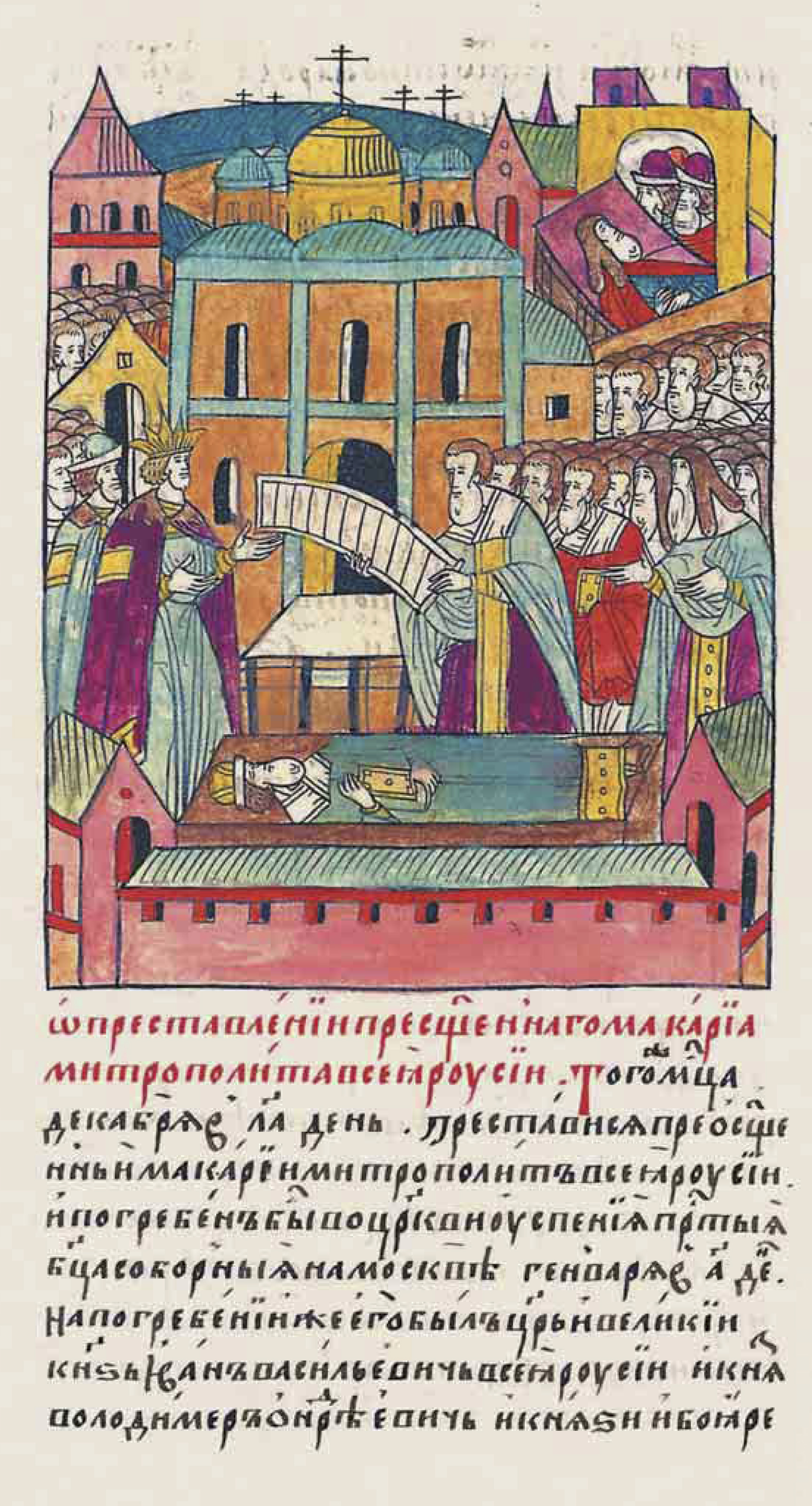
Macarius of Moscow's death, as depicted in the Illustrated Chronicle of Ivan the Terrible

- c. January–June – Matija Popović, Serb scribe and printer (born c. 1490, murdered)
- January – Seydi Ali Reis, Ottoman navigator, geographer, and travel writer (born 1498)
- January 12 – Macarius of Moscow, Russian Orthodox theologian, essayist, and illuminator (born 1482)
- February 2 – Lawrence Torrentinus, Dutch and Italian humanist and printer (born 1499)
- February 22 – Pierre de Bocosel de Chastelard, French poet (born 1540, executed)
- March 2 – Ercole Gonzaga, Mantuan Catholic theologian (born 1505)
- March 11 – Jacopo Nardi, Florentine historian (born 1476)
- March 13 – Hieronymus Froben, Swiss printer (born 1501)
- March 17 – Girolamo Seripando, Italian and Aragonese Catholic theologian (born 1493)
- March 27 – Heinrich Glarean, Swiss poet and humanist (born 1488)
- April 18 – Francisco Marroquín, Guatemalan Catholic theologian and translator (born 1499)
- April 30 – Henry Stafford, English translator, publisher, and polemicist (born 1501)
- May 21 – Martynas Mažvydas, Lithuanian compiler, poet, and editor (born 1510)
- July 9 – Richard Smyth, English Catholic theologian (born c. 1500)
- July 24 – Giambattista Gelli, Florentine historian and philosopher (born 1498)
- August 18 – Étienne de La Boétie, French philosopher (born 1530)
- August 30 – Wolfgang Musculus, Lorrainian-born Calvinist theologian (born 1497)
- November – John Bale, English historian (born 1495)
- November 5 – Iacob Heraclid, Maltese-born humanist and military theorist (born 1527, lynched)
- December 29
  - Sebastian Castellio, French Calvinist theologian (born 1515)
  - Thomas Naogeorgus, German dramatist and Lutheran theologian (born 1508)
- Unknown dates
  - John Barret, English Protestant theologian (birth year not known)
  - Walter Deloenus, Dutch translator and Anabaptist theologian (born c. 1500)
  - Marcantonio Genua, Genoan philosopher (born 1491)
  - Felipe de Guevara, Spanish art critic and humanist (birth year not known)
  - Gerard Legh, English writer on heraldry (birth year not known)
  - Jean Poldo d'Albenas, French historian and translator (born 1512)
  - Pedro de Soto, Spanish Catholic theologian (born 1493)
  - John Véron, Huguenot polemicist and lexicographer (birth year not known)
- Probable year – Arthur Brooke, English poet (birth year not known)
- Approximate year
  - William Baldwin, English writer, editor and theatrical director (born c. 1515)
  - Gaspar Correia, Portuguese Goan historian (born c. 1492)
