= 1618 in literature =

List of years in literature	(table)
- … 1608; 1609; 1610; 1611; 1612; 1613; 1614; 1615; 1616; 1617; 1618; 1619; 1620; 1621; 1622; 1623; 1624; 1625; 1626; 1627; 1628 …
- Art; Archaeology; Architecture; Literature; Music; Philosophy; Science; +...

This article contains information about the literary events and publications of 1618.

== Events ==
- January – Lady Hay and eight other Court ladies plan and rehearse a Ladies' Masque or Masque for Ladies, intended for a Twelfth Night performance, but it is cancelled a few days before, either by King James or Queen Anne.
- January 4 – Sir Francis Bacon is appointed Lord Chancellor by King James I of England.
- April 6 (Easter Monday) – The King's Men perform Twelfth Night at Court.
- April 7 – The King's Men perform The Winter's Tale at Court.
- July – Ben Jonson sets out to walk to Scotland.
- Catherine de Vivonne, marquise de Rambouillet, begins remodelling the Paris residence which becomes the Hôtel de Rambouillet to form a literary salon.

== New books ==
=== Prose ===
- William Cecil, 1st Baron Burghley – Certain Precepts or Directions, For the Well-ordering and Carriage of a Man's Life
- Renold Elstracke – Braziliologia
- Vicente Espinel – Relaciones de la vida del escudero Marcos de Obregón
- Robert Fludd – De Musica Mundana
- Michael Maier – Atalanta Fugiens
  - Themis aurea
- Daniel Mögling – Speculum Sophicum Rhodo-Stauroticum
- John Selden – History of Tythes

=== Drama ===
- Anonymous – The Tragedy of Amurath
- Jakob Ayrer (died 1605) – Opus Theatricum published
- Guillén de Castro y Bellvis – Comedias, part 1
- Lope de Vega
  - La moza de cántaro (The Pitcher Girls)
  - El rey don Pedro en Madrid
- Nathan Field – Amends for Ladies published
- John Fletcher – The Loyal Subject
- Peter Heylin – Theomachia (in Latin)
- Barten Holyday – Technogamia
- Ben Jonson – masques
  - Pleasure Reconciled to Virtue
  - For the Honour of Wales

=== Poetry ===
- Jacob Cats – Emblemata
- Juan Martínez de Jáuregui y Aguilar – Rimas
- John Taylor – The Pennylesse Pilgrimage

== Births ==
- March 23 – Ferrante Pallavicino, Italian satirist (died 1644)
- April – Agustín Moreto y Cavana, Spanish dramatist and priest (died 1661)
- Unknown dates
  - Thomas Blount, English antiquary and lexicographer, (died 1679)
  - Abraham Cowley, English poet (died 1667)
  - Raffaello Fabretti, Italian antiquary (died 1700)
  - Isaac Vossius, Dutch scholar and librarian (died 1689)
- Probable year of birth – Jacques Chausson, French writer and criminal (died 1661)

== Deaths ==
- July – John Davies of Hereford, Anglo-Welsh poet (born c. 1565)
- July 26 – Martinus Smiglecius, Polish Jesuit philosopher (born 1563)
- August 23 – Gerbrand Adriaenszoon Bredero, Dutch poet (born 1585)
- September 22 – Jacobus Taurinus, Dutch theologian (born 1576)
- September 28 – Joshua Sylvester, English poet (born 1563)
- October 29 – Sir Walter Ralegh, English adventurer and author (executed, born c. 1554)
- Unknown dates
  - François de Boivin, French chronicler
  - Richard Stanihurst, Irish translator of Virgil (born 1547)
- Probable year – Bento Teixeira, Portuguese poet (born c. 1561)
