= Basel Mission Press =

First printing press in Karnataka, India

- Industry: Printing press
- Founded: 1841; 185 years ago in Balmatta, Mangalore, India
- Founder: Gottfried Hartmann Weigle
- Products: Newspaper; Dictionary; Religious Books

Basel Mission Press is the first printing press of coastal Karnataka and was established in 1841 at Balmatta, Mangalore, India. This printing press was gifted to Gottfried Weigle by Basel Mission of Switzerland who had been to Bombay to get a booklet printed. Tulu Kirthanegalu by the lithographic process was the first book printed in the Manguluru Branch in 1841. In 1841, Gottfried Weigle obtained a printing press from Bombay and brought it back to Mangalore in 1842 with two Marathi printing assistants. In 1842, they published a Kannada pamphlet by Moegling and made 1500 copies. The next item was Christian Greiner's Tulu translation of St. Matthew's Gospel. In July 1841, the press began the first Kannada newspaper called "Mangalur-samachar" edited by Hermann Moegling. Two issues a month were produced until February 1844, after which it was printed in Bellary. Basel Mission Press celebrated its 175th anniversary celebrations in 2016. Basel Mission Press is now renamed as Balmatta Institute of Printing Technology and Book Craft offers courses in printing technology and book binding. The press is being maintained by Karnataka Christian Education Society (KACES) since 1972

== Early life of Gottfried Weigle ==
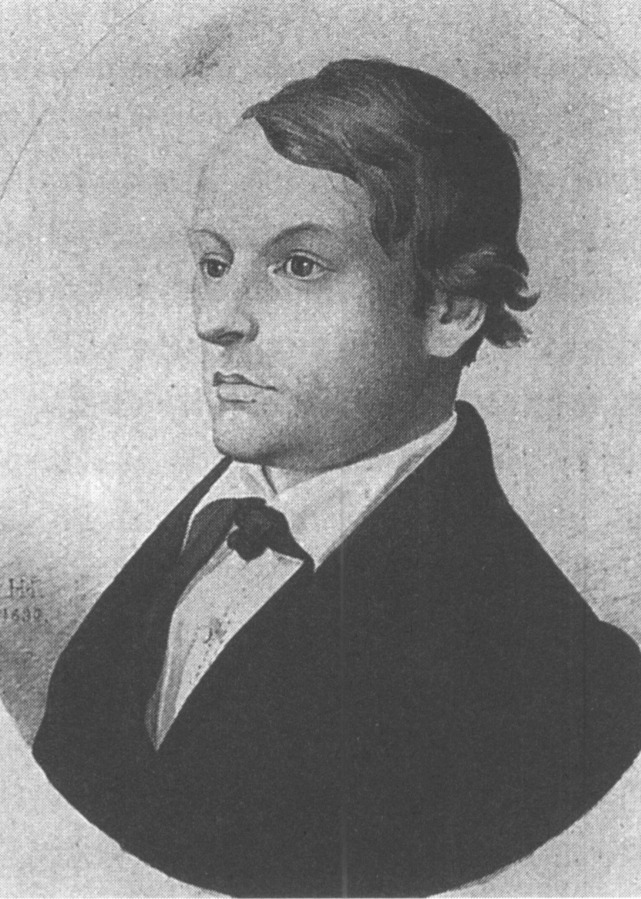
Gottfried Weigle, (1816-1855)

Gottfried Hartmann Weigle was born on 1 July 1816 in the house of a chairman in the village of Zell, a beautiful place on the banks of the Neckar River in Württemberg. After graduating in 1834 he joined the theological training in Tübingen. When he joined the apprenticeship, he specialized not only in teaching but also in various training. He came to India in 1840 after serving as a lecturer in Basel after being baptized at St. George's Church in 1836., who started the printing industry in 1841 in Mangalore.

== Printing in Kannada ==
The East India Company used their powers to bring Roman scripts to the country's languages, but the British authorities, who first pulled the literary treasure of Hosanagadda (new Kannada), with the use of nails started the printing of Kannada from 1817 with the help of missionaries and natives. The British India company's government, to facilitate their administration funded specialist from missionaries to print Kannada, Telugu and Tamil languages. William Reeve of the London Mission produced an English to Kannada dictionary in 1824, and a Kannada to English dictionary in 1832, at the behest of the government of Madras. Krishnamacharya's Kannada grammar was printed in 1830. It was easy to assemble English nails when these prints were done. For the Kannada letters to be inserted, the Kannada letters were hand-inscribed and printed in the order of drawing images on a piece of wood. There are records of college presses using the same type of presses for Telugu and Kannada. Therefore, there are many works that have been printed in Kannada books using the letter prints that look like Telugu letters. For example, William Carey's first Kannada grammar, printed in Calcutta, 1817 and the New Testament, part of the 1824 Truth Book. Later in the Bellary Mission Press, many parts of Kannada truth published by John Honds were printed.Later in the Bellary Mission Press, many parts of Kannada truth published by John Honds were printed.Later in the Bellary Mission Press, many parts of Kannada satyaveda published by John Honds were printed in the similar way. The printing of "Mangaluru Samachar" newspaper is considered as the milestone in the history of printing technology in India. Malayalam - English dictionary of Hermann Gundert, a German missionary, scholar and linguist was also printed as Basel Mission Press.

== Gravel printing ==
There was another type of printing before the use of Kannada printing presses. Printing work was regularly broadcast around the world, with Roman, English, and other scripts being produced. But during the interval, the printing press came into existence when the Kannada script was not available. The rock was discovered in 1796 by Prague resident Eloyd Seinfeld. For this purpose, calcium carbonate-containing stone and grease-like liquids were used. This is called printing or lithography. The people knew how to carve inscriptions on stone but did not know how to get more copies. This tactic, brought from Europe in India, was not straightforward. The letters were engraved on a piece of soft wood and then printed on a soft stone. Stone printing was done using greasy oil, paper and pens. Next a human-powered machine was invented and it became a lithography print. The stone resembling a smooth Kadappa stone and then writing the letters in reverse order looking at the letters in the mirror and writing them on the paper was how the gravel printing as done. Tulu-English Dictionary was printed at Basel Mission Press in 1888. "Mangalura Samachara" was lithographed in 1843 at the Basel Mission Printing Press using stone slabs. The stone slabs are still preserved at the printing press in Balmatta, Mangaluru.

== Botanical prints ==
The printer Johann Jakob Hunziker worked at the Basel Mission Press from 1857 to 1862 and set upon working on a series of botanical prints in which he used actual plant leaves which were inked onto lithographic plates. His work distributed in a limited set of copies included more than a 100 species of local plants.

== Printing of Tulu ==
When the Mission entered Kannada in 1841, they worked on developing Kannada typography with the aim of printing Kannada and Tulu works. Their first printing press was in use by 1841 and their first Tulu translation of the Bible was printed in 1841, as well as educational books and secular novels; this had a lasting impact on culture of Karnataka’s culture with Kittel’s dictionary providing a standardization of the written language. However, it has also been suggested that Tulu works being printed in Kannada fonts may have helped lead to the gradual disuse of Tulu script.

Religious books and text books in Kannada language were printed in Mumbai and Madras. Malayalam books were printed and brought from Kallikote. The first Biblical book in Malayalam for the Basel Mission was printed at Calicut and the first book of the Basel Mission Songs was printed in Mumbai, both in the year 1840.

The Lord’s Prayer was lithographed in Kannada and Tulu in 1842, while a newspaper (the Mangalur Samachar) was also launched in 1844.

When Weigle came to India, he wandered around the city of Mumbai, American Marathi printers and many other places not only to learn the vernacular language, but also to get the full information on gravel printing before establishing the printing press in Mangalore. He not only collected the information but also brought the below items required for Mangalore Christian meeting from Bombay for which many of his Christian friends assisted him.

- One lithography (Gravel printing machine)
- 50 Kannada songs books
- 2 trained printing Marathi skill workers
- 4 Germany's lithography finest stones.

The 50 songs which was printed in Mumbai is given the title name as"Geetegalu" (songs). In this book 16 songs are written by Moegling, 10 songs written by Weigle, 2 songs written by Layyar. The front cover of the book is gravel printed and is mentioned that it was printed in 1840 in the town of Mumbai by the writings of Pandit Anandarayas. The first Tulu prayer book was printed after the printing press was brought from Mumbai. In 1842, another gravel stone was brought from Madras. In this Gravel Printing press, a Tulu language work, the "Mattaaye Barethi Suvartamana" Gospel, was published Kannada translation of Graner, a part of the Bible. The missionaries went on to publish folklore as only religious and elementary texts could not reach the masses. Large texts, text books, and maps for school use were printed. This press was then known as the German Mission Press.The Madras government chose the Basel Mission Press to print the Kannada manuscripts in their newspaper, while the Mumbai government printed text books for their schools. Not only did the Kannada script in Tulu language was used in this printing press, the press also published books in Badaga, Kodava and Konkani languages. The praise must therefore be credited to the German missionaries who took the precaution of not being blown away by the united Karnataka province.

== Printing from mold nails ==
The preparations for the establishment of the Letter Press. New seal machines with mold nails were brought from abroad. From 1852, press began printing with the use of lettering. Panduranga Shet, a native of Mangalore, was hired to carve the first letters. Tommy Luklin trained in printing by Plebst joined the press. He served the Basel Mission press until 1865. In the new printing system, the 13th year report of the Basel Mission was first printed in English using English spines brought from Germany. The Kannada printing using mold nails started from 1853 and printed the Kannada Panchanga (calendar). A separate binding division was arranged in the press under the leadership of Plebst. Lukas Joshua from Ucchila was sent to Bellary, Madras for training and appointed as its chief of binding. Gradually, Joshua was promoted and under his leadership opened a separate binding division and continued operation. It was called the "Joshua Binding Walkers" and the department was operating in the building that currently houses Athena Hospital. All of the books printed at the Basel Mission Press were bound here. From 1858, the press began to develop and make new seams. There were 28 workers (12 workers to assemble nails, 6 workers to print. 5 workers to hoard nails, two workers to carve nail letters). Even though work outside the 1860s was reduced, there was no shortage of work, as the writings of Kittel and Moggling were printed here. Tulu Nadu was divided into Dakshina Kannada and Uttara Kannada districts. Then the government started two press in Mangalore and Sirsi. Basel Mission Press had to provide mold nails, printing equipment and trained workers to these two presses. Since 1861, a separate book shop has been opened for booksellers. Press at Tallachery was closed, the Malayalam printing was continued in Mangalore.

In 1868 under the leadership of Flyderer, a separate branch was started to sell book and named it as Basel Mission Book and Tract Depository in the Bandar region of Mangalore. It then moved to Hampankatta and continued to operate until 1965. It includes not only published books but also geographical, maps, etc., at Basel Mission Press, imported from abroad writing materials. Laboratory equipment used for school and science related materials were also sold. In the late 19th century, it was one of the biggest press in Karnataka which published thousands of books in Kannada, English, Tulu and Tamil, Malayalam, Sanskrit, German, French, Kodava, Badaga, Konkani languages. Basel Mission Press includes not only printing but also making mold nails, making photo blocks, printing equipment for other presses, making wood blocks, making machine cylinders. In 1929, the press had 6 workers to make correction, 30 workers to print, 42 workers to assemble nail, 5 woodworkers, 6 worker for casting, 2 workers for Engine Section, 14 Mercenary, 2 Packers, 2 Warehouse, 2 Housekeeping, 3 security persons and were over 150 workers.

The Madras Government, in its 1875 Administration Manual noted that the printing of the Basel Mission Press was then unequal compared to any other Indian press. In 1870 a part of the Hindu Power Press in Mangalore, Basel Mission Press was the only printing press in the district The printing presses which were later established in the district are from those workers who had worked here. Basel Mission Press wrote that "This shop, which is a small class with stone masonry, now employs hundreds of people and is a strong, beautiful home in the Kannada district. Through this chapel, many people in our district were trained in the molding jobs and were able to set up freelancers independently. Many workers had to make a living. "in an article in the commemorative issue of the 13th Karnataka Literary Conference held in Mangalore in 1927.

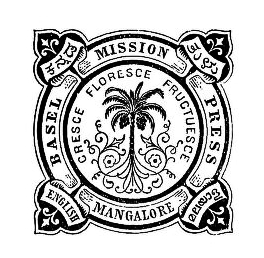
Basel Mission Press Logo

In 1870, the Basel Mission Press logo had a picture of a coconut tree on the four sides of the four languages known as Kannada Tulu Malayalam and English. When the Basel Mission arrived in Mangalore in 1834, it was in the same area as the pre-existing Christian worship and primary school, that the printing press was established in 1841 and then moved to the YMCA building on Phalnir Road in 1942. It is in this environment that the Basel Evangelical Theological Seminary was established in 1847 and moved to its present location in 1863 and is now operating as the Karnataka Theological College. The Press operated in the same location until 1913. In 1913 the press was moved to the new building in site opposite the present Peace Temple. Due to the effects of the 1914 World War, the Press was run by a local organization, which until 1927 was known as the Canaries Evangelical Mission Press. Around 1928, a small room was built on the opposite side of the Press Building, which was an office room. The cool air that blows the room is called the Saviolo, and there is an iron ladder system to enter the press while the rest of the missionaries are at work. In this case, the lower board was replaced by an iron-on board. The building currently houses the Habic Technical Training Institute established by the Basel Missionaries.

The growth of the Basel Mission Press growth has been hampered by various factors, such as other printing presses established in the district since the 1960s, and a new type of printing press. The Press's record book shows a decrease in the number of workers, with 114 employees in 1939, 87 in 1942 and 16 in 1967. The Basel Mission opened the Hebeck Technical Training School in 1964 in the Press building and opened the Technical Training School in the district. In 1965 the book shop in Hampankatta was closed. Then again, the publishing house was shut down in the 1970s. The Karnataka Christian Educational Society came into being as an autonomous body with the intention of establishing other educational institutions under the leadership of Jattan. In the 1970s, the Commonwealth group was closed and KCES acquired a 3.5-acre (1.4 ha) site with a factory. Built in 1907, the Basel Mission Neighborhood factory was built in 1907 during the First World War in 1914, when the Basel Mission Allied Factory and the Weave factory were under the Commonwealth. The Commonwealth had also expanded the building to support the factory in Neyyi. Rev was the secretary of the Causes organization, which has held several programs to preserve the closed Basel Mission Press and its contributing legacy under the leadership of the Dr. C.D. Jattin, a factory was opened in this part of the building. Until 1982, works for the loom and new invention were carried out and re-established the Basel Mission Press as a Balmatha Master Press. Mr. K A Kuruvil, who served as manager at Wesleyan Mission Press in Mysore was hired and brought all the machinery required for the Basel Mission to keep the press going. It was started in 1972 with the nickname 'Balmatha Master Ppress' with the cooperation of many former employees who hired Maman Phillippe, a veteran in the printing industry from 1976 to 1980. K. A. Kuruvilla and Manman Philippe and are responsible for the growing number of presses restored until the 1980s. Press name was changed to the Balmatha Institute of Printing Technology to provide binding and printing training to implement the training that Basel Mission Press had previously undertaken. This led to the launch of a high-quality printing system of the Basel Mission Press. The present building was built in 1907 for a factory in Basel Mission. In line with this, after 1914, the Commonwealth-run weave was expanded for factory purposes, and after 1970, the Coase Company continued the division of the weave in the same building.The museum is intended to preserve the Basel Mission Press's old printers and collections in the present building.

Also, Basel Mission Book Shop, which was located in Vijaya Penn Mart in Hampankatta at around 1965, was closed and sold to Chandana Brothers. Mr. Vincent Pramodan (75), Mr. George Bangera (82) and Mr. Bhawani Shankar (84), who served in the former Basel Mission Press, still recall that there were buses, bonuses, once-a-year boat trips and canteen arrangements.

Most of the works printed in Basel Mission Press are in the Basel Patriarchy of Switzerland, in the form of microfilms and many Kannada, Tulu and Malayalam works and Researchers are still using it. The journalist also undertakes the work of searching for and recording works that are not available. Dictionaries, grammar, geometry, music book etc. ptinted at Basel Mission Press are being reprinted by various organizations. The press is still reprinting books for the hand meeting, Kannada Tulu Music Book, Forty Days of Shramavara, Prayer Book, Kannada Tulu Songs, Elim Khoras etc. All right to reprint, research etc. (@) is in favor of Mission 21 (O issio T21), Karnataka Theological College, Mangalore.

== Awards ==
- Message Special Awards For services to Kannada and Tulu language literature and culture through the Basel Missionaries Printing Service to KCES in 2003
- 2013 Alva's Nudisiri Award to Moegling's for his contribution and his role in the development of Kannada language was awarded to KCES in 2013

The Press, which has been under the administration of the Cosses for the past 43 years, has seen a number of developments. The large cylinder printing at the Basel Mission Press, the Automatic Printing, Victoria Printing Hand Feeding, as well as the 2 smaller printing machines are still in the works. Previously there were folding, book rounding, book corner, 2 cutting machines for binding. There is also screen printing, a good binding system. The mold and high-end binding of mold nails is still well known.

== 21st century ==
In 2016, the Press celebrated its 175 anniversary. At the time of the anniversary, the Press was named the Balmatta Institute of Printing Technology and Book Craft and was run by KACES (Karnataka Christian Educational Society); it had 15 employees and ran courses in printing technology and book binding through Balmatta Institute of Printingg Technology and Book Craft.
