= Daniel Mögling =

Daniel Mögling is the name of:

- Daniel Mögling (1546-1603), physician and professor of medicine
- Daniel Mögling (1596-1635), alchemist and Rosicrucian
