= Mögling =

Mögling may refer to the surname of the following persons:

- Daniel Mögling (1596–1635), an alchemist and astronomer
- Hermann Mögling (1811-1881), a German missionary from Basel Mission and a writer in Kannada

Mögling may refer to one of the following places:

- Mögling, part of Taufkirchen/Vils, in Lkr Erding, Bavaria, Germany. PLZ:D-84416 (42°21'50" N, 12°06'50" E)
- Mögling, Bavaria, Germany. PLZ: D- (48°44'06" N, 12°39'11" E.)
