= D'Albenas =

D'Albenas is a surname. Notable people with the surname include:

- Francis D'Albenas (born 1996), Uruguayan footballer
- Jean Poldo d'Albenas (1512–1563), French politician
