= Jacopo Zabarella =

Italian philosopher

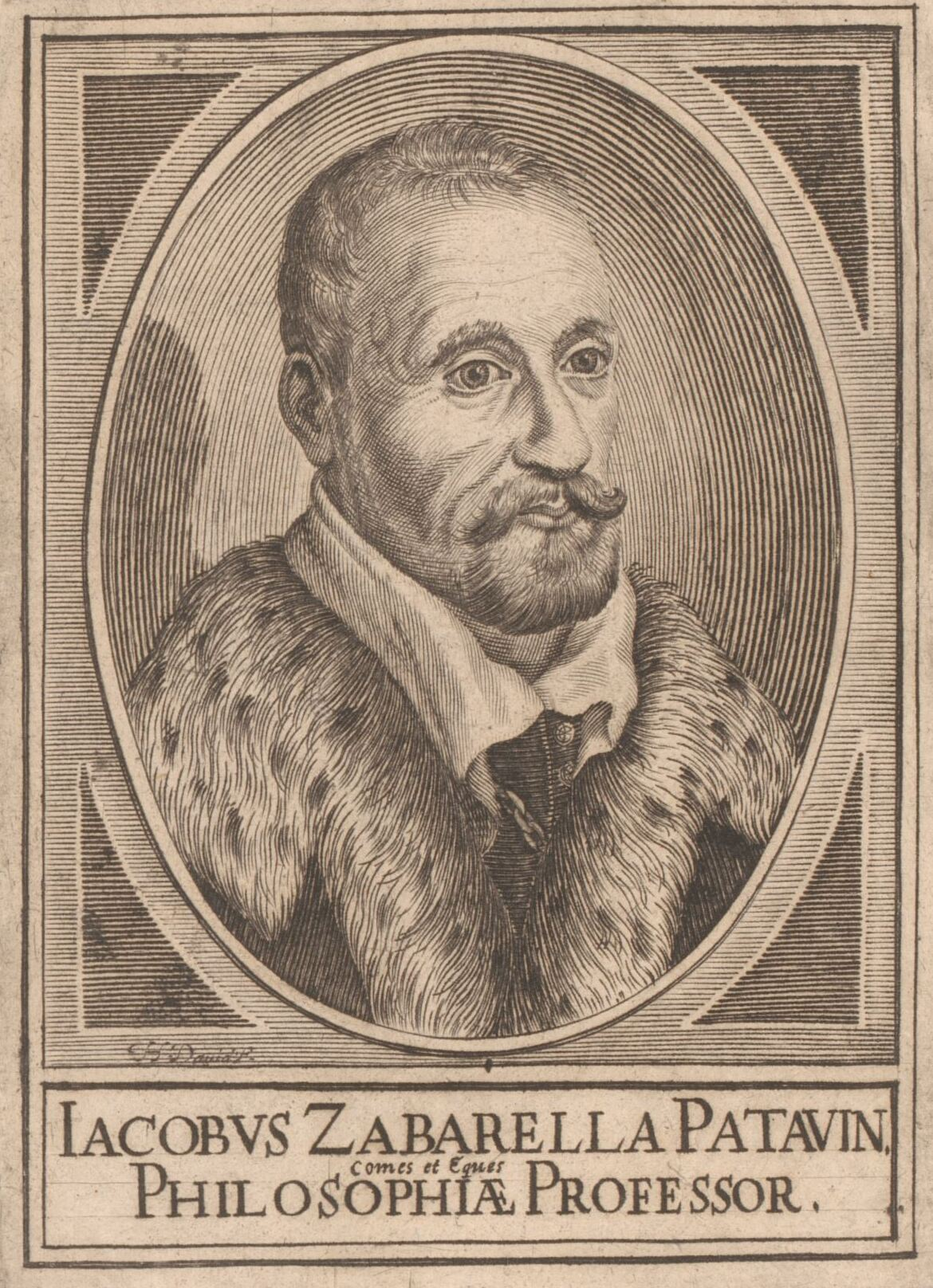
- Engraving of Zabarella, 1630
- Born: 5 August 1533; Padua, Republic of Venice (now Province of Padua, Veneto, Italy)
- Died: 15 September 1589 (aged 56); Padua, Republic of Venice (now Province of Padua, Veneto, Italy)

Philosophical work
- Era: Renaissance philosophy
- Region: Western philosophy; Italian philosophy
- School: Aristotelianism; Averroism; Scholasticism
- Main interests: Metaphysics, logics, philology

Giacomo (or Jacopo) Zabarella (5 September 1533 – 15 October 1589) was an Italian Aristotelian philosopher and logician.

== Life ==
Zabarella was born into a noble Paduan family. He received a humanist education and entered the University of Padua, where he received a doctorate in 1553. His teachers included Francesco Robortello in humanities, Bernardino Tomitano in logic, Marcantonio Genua in physics and metaphysics, and Pietro Catena in mathematics. In 1564 he succeeded Tomitano in the chair of logic. In 1577 he was promoted to the first extraordinary chair of natural philosophy. He died in Padua at the age of 56 in 1589. His entire teaching career was spent at his native university. His successor was Cesare Cremonini.

== Works ==
Zabarella's works reflect his teaching in the Aristotelian tradition. His first published work was Opera logica (Venice 1578), followed by Tabula logicae (1578). His commentary on Aristotle's Posterior Analytics appeared in 1582. His great work in natural philosophy was De rebus naturalibus, published posthumously in 1590. It constituted 30 treatises on Aristotelian natural philosophy, the introduction to which was written only weeks before his death. His two sons edited his incomplete commentaries on Aristotle's texts, also published posthumously (the commentary on the Physics in 1601 and the commentary on On the Soul (1605).

Zabarella consulted newly recovered Greek commentators such as Alexander of Aphrodisias, Philoponus, Simplicius, and Themistius, as well as medieval commentators like Thomas Aquinas, Walter Burley, and Averroes. Unlike some earlier scholastic philosophers, he was literate in Greek and was therefore able to use the Greek texts of Aristotle. He devoted much effort to presenting what he considered to be the true meaning of Aristotle's texts.

== Writings ==
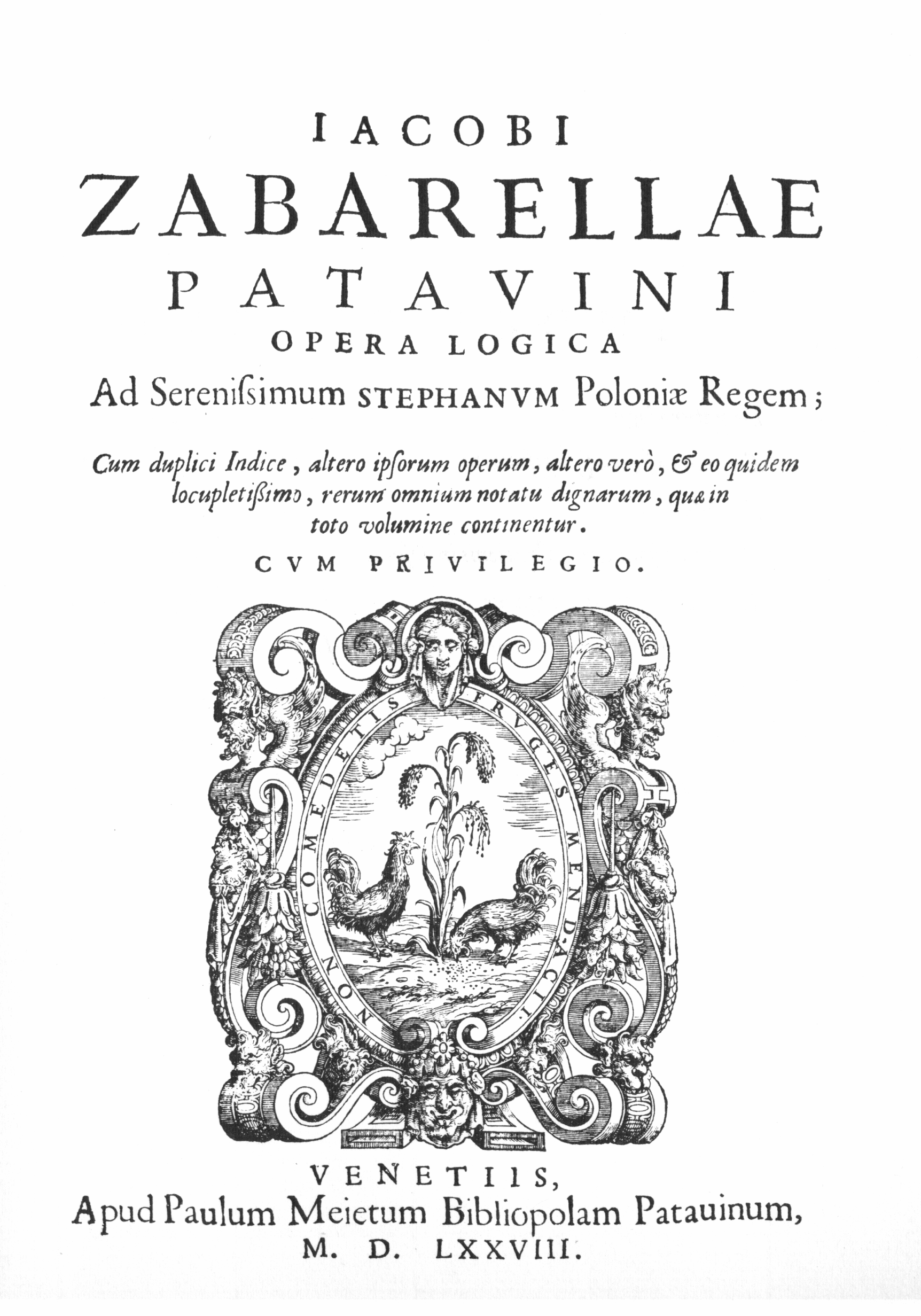
Title page of Opera logica (1578)

- Opera logica. 1st edition (Venice, 1578) contains:
1. De natura logicae, an introductory text on the nature of logic
2. De quarta figura syllogismorum
3. De methodis
4. De conversione demonstrationi in definitionem
5. De propositionibus necessariis
6. De speciebus demonstrationis
7. De regressus
8. De tribus praecognitis
9. De medio demonstrationis
- De naturalis scientiae constitutione. (Venice, 1586).
- De rebus naturalibus: libri XXX (Koln, 1590).
- Opera logica. 3rd edition (Koln, 1597). With the addition of:
10. In II libros Posteriores analyticos commentarii (Commentary on Aristotle's Posterior Analytics, Venice, 1582)
11. De doctrinae ordine apologia (Padua, 1585)
12. Tabulae logicae (Venice, 1578)
- In libros Aristotelis physicorum commentarii. (Venice, 1601).
- Commentarii in III libros De anima (Venice, 1605).

== Editions and translations ==
- Opera logica, anastatic reprint of the Kōln 1597 edition by Wilhelm Risse (Hildesheim: Georg Olms, 1966).
- Tables de logique. Sur l'Introduction de Porphyre, les Catégories, le De l'interprétation et les Premiers Analytiques d'Aristote: Petite synopse introductive à la logique aristotélicienne, tr. Michel Bastit (Paris: L'Harmattan, 2003).
- La nature de la logique, tr. Dominique Bouillon (Paris: Vrin, 2009).
- On Methods and On Regressus, ed. and tr. John P. McCaskey (I Tatti Renaissance Library; Harvard University Press, 2014).
  - Volume 1, On Methods, Books I–II.
  - Volume 2, On Methods, Books III–IV and On Regressus.
- De rebus naturalibus libri XXX, ed. José M. García Valverde (Brill, 2016). See also:
1. De inventione aeterni motoris. De rebus naturalibus liber V, ed. J. M. García Valverde (Bruniana & Campanelliana, 2012).
2. De sensu gente. De rebus naturalibus liber XXIV, ed. J. M. García Valverde (Rivista di Storia della Filosofia, 2012).
3. De mente agente. De rebus naturalibus liber XXIX, ed. J. M. García Valverde, Fragmentos de Filosofía, 9 (2011).
