= Essex's Rebellion =

Unsuccessful rebellion in England (1601)

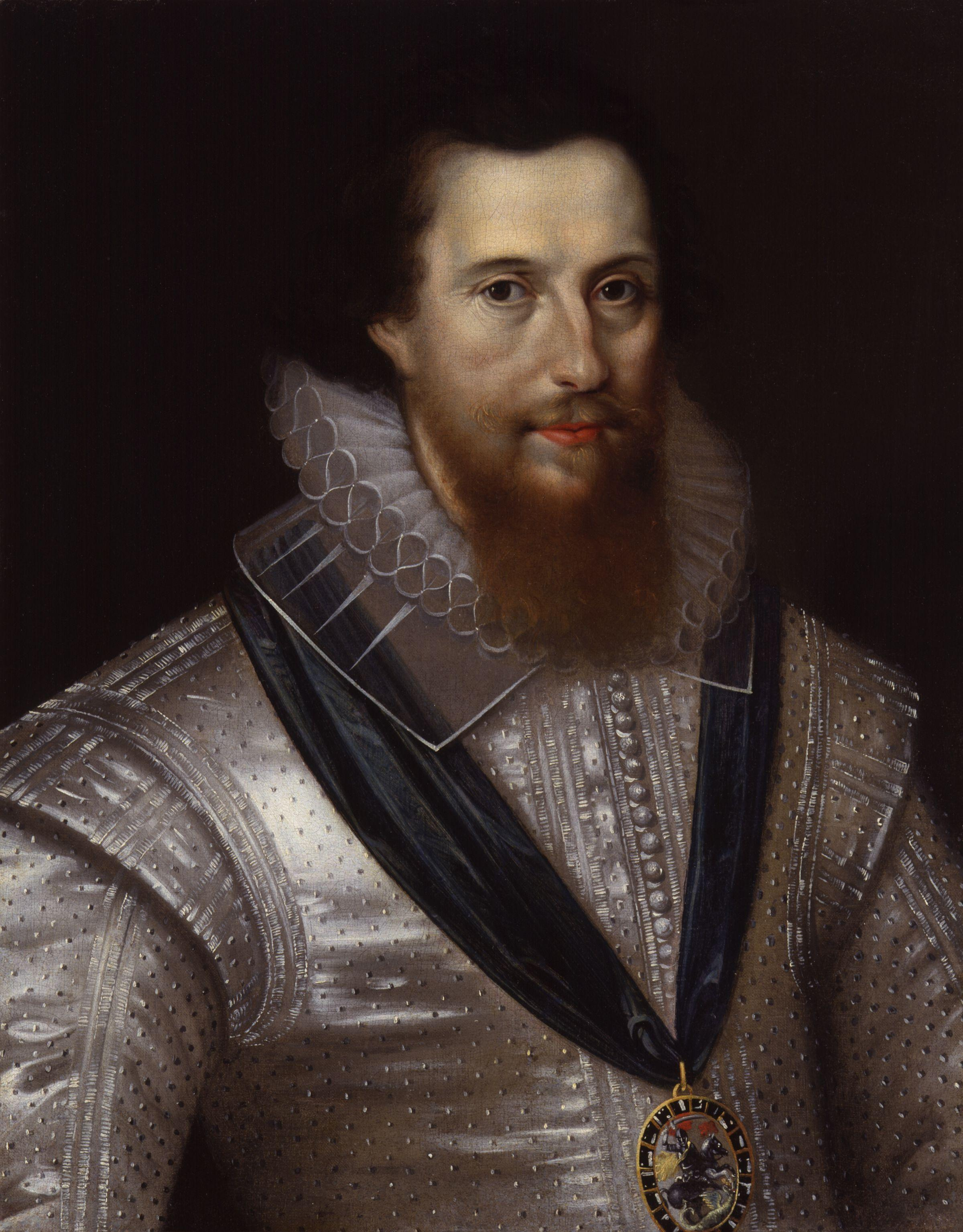
Portrait of the Earl of Essex by Marcus Gheeraerts the Younger

Essex's Rebellion was an unsuccessful rebellion led by Robert Devereux, 2nd Earl of Essex, in February 1600/1601 (O.S./N.S.) against Queen Elizabeth I and the English court faction led by Sir Robert Cecil to gain further influence at court. Essex was a former favourite of the queen who had lost her favour by his failure as Lord Lieutenant of Ireland over the previous two years.

The rebellion took place entirely in London, and lasted a single day, the 8th of February, by the end of which Essex surrendered, having completely failed to rouse the citizenry. Essex and four of his most prominent supporters were tried and executed, while others captured were imprisoned or fined. The government had had at least some awareness that a rebellion was coming, and were able to act promptly with sufficient forces to bottle up the conspirators in Essex's house in central London, leaving them little choice but to surrender.

== Background ==
Robert Devereux, 2nd Earl of Essex (1565–1601), was the main leader of Essex's Rebellion in 1601. The main tensions that led to the rebellion began in 1599, when Essex was appointed Lord Lieutenant of Ireland. He was sent to Ireland with the mission of subduing the revolts led by the Earl of Tyrone, leading one of the largest expeditionary forces ever sent to the country.

It was expected that Essex would crush the rebellion immediately, but he fought a series of inconclusive battles, squandered his funds, and was unable to face the Irish in any sort of engagement. Given these difficulties, Essex eventually made a truce with Tyrone. This truce was seen as a disgrace to England and a challenge to the authority of those in power. He proceeded to leave Ireland and returned to England. His time spent as Lord Lieutenant of Ireland proved disastrous to him; his return was in express defiance of the orders of the Queen. She spoke out on his behaviour, calling it "perilous and contemptable". Essex was deprived of his offices in June 1600 and promptly placed under house arrest. His ambition had been to direct an anti-Habsburg foreign policy for England while covertly facilitating the accession of James VI of Scotland to the English throne.

Essex's loss of position at court fuelled his sense of grievance towards the Cecil "faction". This may have made him fearful of assassination attempts and suspicious of a Cecilian policy of seeking peace with Spain. In disgrace as well as in political and financial ruin, Essex wrote several letters of submission to the Queen, and by August 1600 he was able to move freely except to return to court. He spent further time sending letters in an attempt to gain permission to do so. In November 1600, the Queen refused to renew his government-granted monopoly on sweet wine, an action that placed Essex in even deeper financial difficulties. He began to create plans to seize the court by force.

== Rebellion ==
Essex's London residence, Essex House, became a focal point for people who were upset with Elizabeth's government. On 3 February 1601, five of the conspiracy leaders met at Drury House, the lodging of Henry Wriothesley, 3rd Earl of Southampton. Hoping to avoid suspicion, Essex himself was not present. The group discussed Essex's proposals for seizing the court, the Tower and the City. Their goal was to force the Queen to change the leaders in her government, particularly Sir Robert Cecil, even if this attempt meant causing harm to the Queen's people.

On 7 February, some of Essex's followers went to the Globe Theatre to ask the Lord Chamberlain's Men to stage a special performance of Richard II with the deposition scene included. The company was hesitant to perform such a controversial play, but eventually agreed once they were promised a payment of 40 shillings (equivalent to £524 in 2025) "more than their ordinary". On the same day, the Privy Council summoned Essex to appear before them, but he refused. He had lost his chance to take the court by surprise, so he fell back on his scheme to rouse the City of London in his favour with the claim that Elizabeth's government had planned to murder him and had sold out England to Spain.

Essex and his followers hastily planned the rising. At about 10 a.m. the next morning (8 February), Sir Thomas Egerton (the Lord Keeper) and three others came to Essex in the name of the Queen. Essex seized the four messengers and kept them hostage while he and his followers (about 200 people) made their way to the city. They timed their arrival to coincide with the end of the sermon at Paul's Cross, because they expected the Lord Mayor to be there. Meanwhile, Cecil sent a warning to the Lord Mayor and the heralds, denouncing Essex as a traitor. Once the word "traitor" was used, many of Essex's followers disappeared, and none of the citizens joined him as he had expected. Essex's position was desperate, and he decided to return to Essex House. When he got there, he found the hostages gone. The Queen's men, under the Earl of Nottingham (the Lord High Admiral), besieged the house. By that evening, after burning incriminating evidence, Essex surrendered. Essex, Southampton, and the other remaining followers were placed under arrest.

Less than two weeks after the aborted rebellion, Essex and Southampton were tried for treason. The trial lasted only a day, and the guilty verdict was a foregone conclusion. Though Essex had burnt incriminating evidence to save his followers prior to his arrest, he was convinced by the Reverend Abdy Ashton to purge his soul of guilt: in turn Essex confessed everyone who was involved, including his sister, Penelope, Lady Rich, on whom he put a great deal of the blame, although no action was taken against her.

== Conclusion ==
On 25 February 1601, Essex was beheaded in the confines of the Tower of London, and buried there in the Church of St Peter ad Vincula. The government was concerned about sympathy for Essex on the occasion and took care to brief the preacher at Paul's Cross (William Barlow) on how to address Essex's confession and execution. Southampton and Sir Henry Neville, however, survived the Tower, to be freed upon the accession of James I. Sir Christopher Blount, Sir Gelli Meyrick, Sir Henry Cuffe, Sir John Davies, and Sir Charles Danvers all stood trial for high treason on 5 March 1601 and were all found guilty. Davies was allowed to leave, but the other four were executed. There were no large-scale executions, however; the other members of the conspiracy were simply fined.
