= Richard Stock =

English clergyman

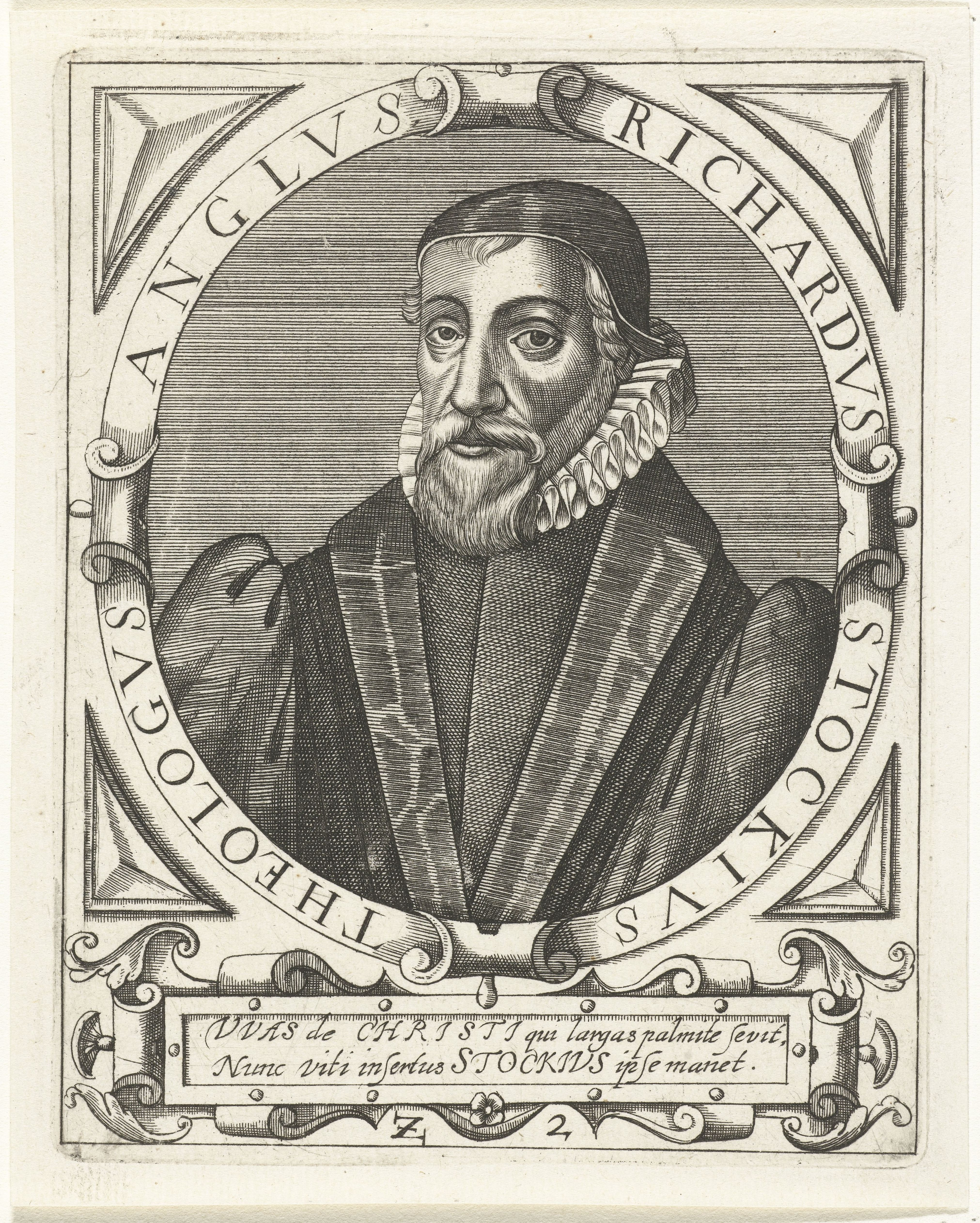
Portrait of Richard Stock engraved by Theodor de Bry

Richard Stock (1569 – 1626) was an English clergyman and one of the Puritan founders of the Feoffees for Impropriations. He was minister at All Hallows, Bread Street in London, from 1611 to 1626.

== Life ==
He was born in York, according to the Worthies of Thomas Fuller. Fuller also says he gained the nickname “green-head” when a young preacher at Paul's Cross, attacking inequality. He preached against the Lord Mayor, too, in 1603, when he was a lecturer at St Augustine Watling Street in London.

He was a scholar of St John's College, Cambridge in 1587, and graduated M.A. there in 1594. He studied with William Whitaker, and became a friend of Thomas Gataker. He was briefly a fellow of Sidney Sussex College.

He became rector of Standlake in 1596. He then was chaplain to Sir Anthony Cope.

At All Hallows, he was the young John Milton's parish priest, and may have had a say in choosing his teachers. Thomas Young may have been recommended by Stock, or Gataker. Later Stock may have had a hand in choosing Milton's replacement college tutor Nathaniel Tovey.

== Works ==
- Ten Answers to Edmund Campion, the Jesuit (1606), English translation of a Latin work of William Whitaker
- The Doctrine and Use of Repentance (1610) sermons
- A Commentary upon the Prophecy of Malachi (1641)
- A Stock of Divine Knowledge: Being a lively description of the Divine Nature. Or, The Divine Essence, Attributes, and Trinity particularly explained and profitably applied. London, 1641
- The Church’s Lamentation for the Loss of the Godly: A Sermon Preached at the Funeral of the Lord Harington on Micah 7:1,2
- A Sermon Preached at Paul’s Cross, November 1606, on Isaiah 9:14-16.
