= John Allenson =

John Allenson (born c. 1558) was an English puritan divine.

Allenson, a native of Durham, matriculated as a sizar of Trinity College, Cambridge, in 1576; but in November of the same year he migrated to St. John's College, where he obtained a scholarship on Mr. Ashton's foundation, and became a pupil of the Puritan Dr. William Whitaker, whose religious principles he adopted. He became B.A. in 1579–80, M.A. in 1583, and B.D. in 1590.

In 1583 he was suspended from the curacy of Barnwell near Cambridge for refusing to subscribe to the articles. On 20 March 1583–4 he was elected a fellow of St. John's College on the Lady Margaret's foundation. In 1589 he was suspended from the curacy of Horningsea, Cambridgeshire, but he nevertheless continued to preach. He held in succession various offices of trust in his college, becoming senior dean and sacrist in 1602–3, and senior bursar in 1603–4.

== Works ==
Allenson edited the following works of his old tutor Dr. Whitaker: Prælectiones (1599), Prælectiones, in quibus tractatur controversia de conciliis contra pontificios, imprimis Rob. Bellarminum (1600), and De Peccato Originali contra Stapletonum (1600). It appears that Allenson took notes of Whitaker's lectures and prepared them for the press.

In 1624 John Ward edited at Frankfort Whitaker's Prælectiones de Sacramentis in Genere et in Specie de SS. Baptismo et Eucharistia, and in the dedication to Dr. Tobie Mathew, Archbishop of York, informed him that Dr. Whitaker had not himself published these lectures: quæ tamen de Sacramentis adversus Bellarminum in Scholis Academiæ publicis prælegit, vir diligentissimus D. Allensonius, collegii D. Joannis Evangelistæ socius, fideli calamo ex ore dictantis excepit et post authoris mortem, cum ipsius D. Whitakeri concisis annotiunculis in memoriæ subsidium scriptis, accurate contulit præloque destinabat. Sed ex rerum humanarum vicissitudine, ipse etiam, antequam prælo mandarentur, fatis concessit, exemplar prælo destinatum post ejus obitum ad manus meas pervenit. Thomas Baker, in his History of St. John's College,’ asserts that the life of Whitaker was written by Allenson; but this is certainly a mistake, as the author of the biography was Abdias Assheton.
