= Gottfried Weigle =

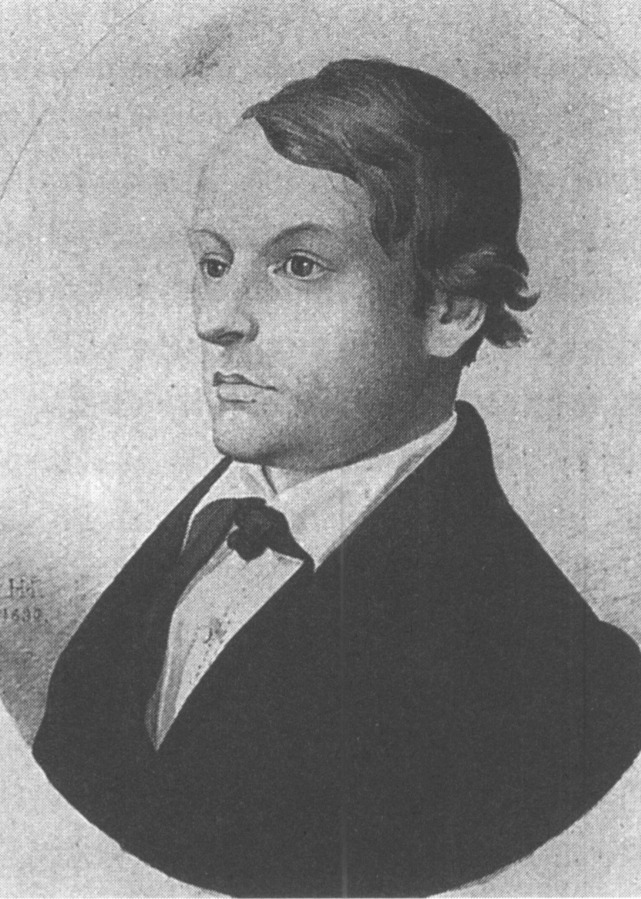
Weigle, Gottfried (1816-1855

Gottfried Weigle (1816–1855) was a German missionary to Karnataka who translated the Bible into Kannada.

He was based in Dharwad, under the Basel Mission in Mangalore. Herrmann Moegling, a fellow student from Tübingen also worked on translation projects. Ferdinand Kittel worked more independently. He also undertook vaccination work in 1846.

When Weigle died in 1855, his cousin Mögling (at the then late age of 45) married Weigle's wife Pauline.
