= Naw'i Khabushani =

Iranian poet

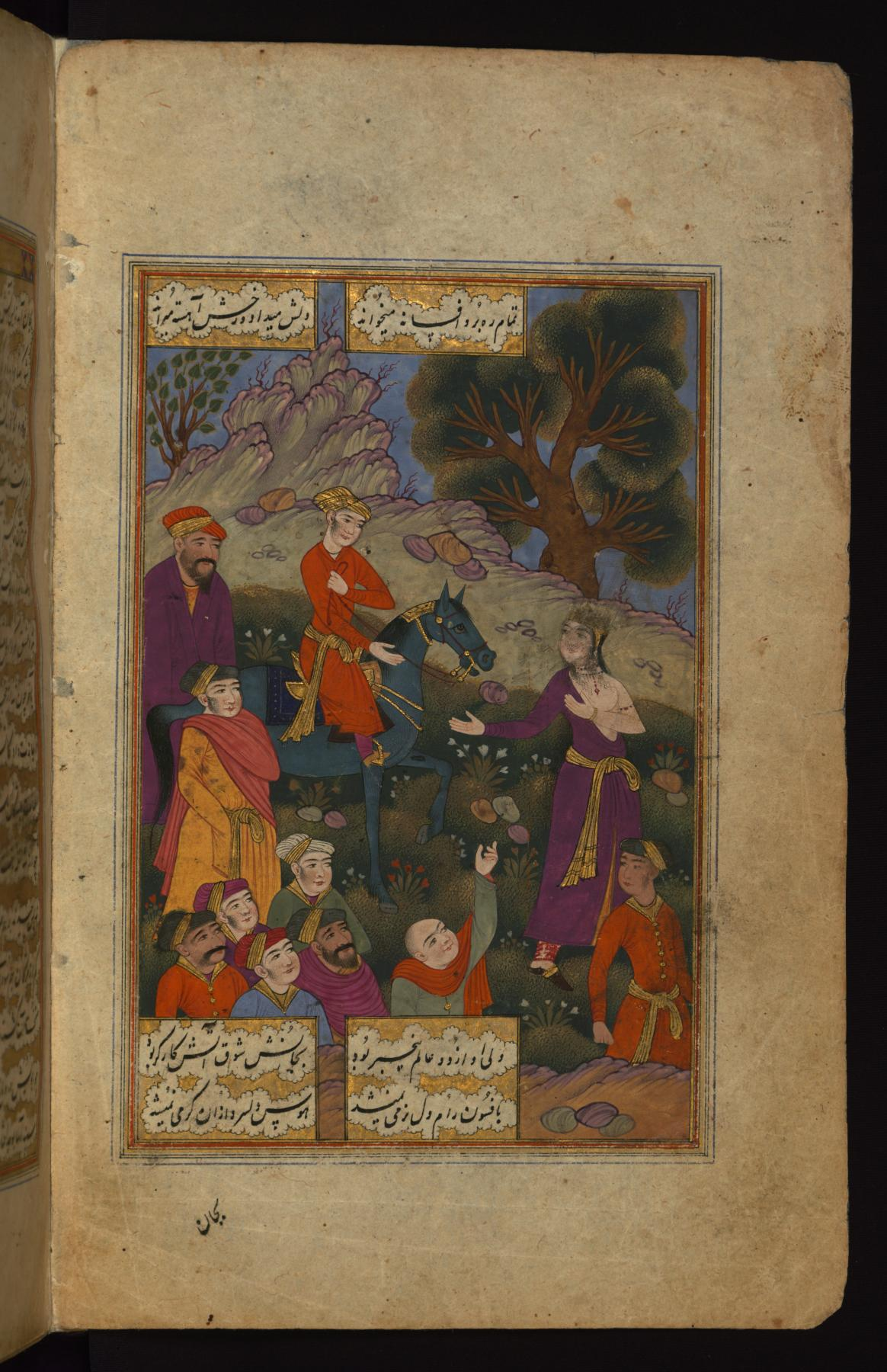
- a painting about Sati created by Muhammad 'Ali Mashhadi. this painting has some verses of Naw'i Khabushan.

poet
- Born: 1563; Carmania (Kerman), Safavid Iran
- Died: 1610; Burhanpur, Mughal Empire
- Major works: Suz o godāz

Mohammad Reza Khabushani also known as Naw'i Khabushani (1563–1610) was a Persian Poet of 16th and early 17th centuries. He was born in Carmenia a city in Persia. He migrated to India and spent rest of his life and served Akbar, King of Mughal Empire and his son, Daniyal Mirza and he returned to Iran once before his permanent inhabitancy in India. He was pupil of Muhtasham Kashani.he has poems in various in various Poetry Forms such as Ghazal, Mathnawi and Qasida. his famous work is Suz o godāz (Burning and Melting). Moreover, he has another poetry book which its name is divān of Nawʿi.

== Suz o Godaz ==
Suz o Godaz means Burning and Melting and is famous work of Naw'i Khabushani. It consists of 492 Verse. This poem is about a girl who committed Sati after the death of her sweetheart.
