= Daniel Mögling (1546–1603) =

German professor of medicine (1546–1603)

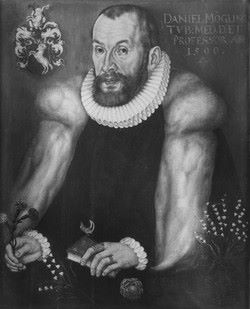
Daniel Mögling

Daniel Mögling (1546 – 24 May 1603), also known as Valerius Saledinus, Theophilus Schweighardt and Florentinus de Valentia, was a German professor of medicine at the University of Tübingen.

== Life ==
Mögling was born in Tübingen, in 1546, and enrolled as a student at the University of Tübingen in 1561. He became Baccalaureus in 1565. He got promoted to Dr. med.. He became city physician (Stadtphysikus) in Weißenburg in 1572 and later in Heidelberg and in Göppingen in 1581. In 1583, he became physician of the Electoral Palatinate and professor in Heidelberg, 1585 physician in Tübingen, 1587 professor at the University of Tübingen and 1588 dean. In 1596 and 1602, he was rector of the University of Tübingen. He died on 24 May 1603 in Tübingen.

He published under the pseudonym "Theophilus Schweighardt" the Rosenkreuzerischen Weisheitsspiegel (Speculum sophicum rhodo-stauroticum) in 1618.

== Family ==
He was the father of Johann Ludwig Mögling and grandfather of Johann David Mögling.
