= Speculum Sophicum Rhodostauroticum =

Early text of Rosicrucianism

Speculum Sophicum Rhodostauroticum ("The Mirror of the Wisdom of the Rosy Cross") is an early text of Rosicrucianism, published in 1618 by the pseudonymous "Theophilus Schweighardt Constantiens", believed to be Daniel Mögling (1596–1635), an alchemist, physician and astronomer.

== See also ==
- Esotericism
- Hermeticism
