= Marcantonio Genua =

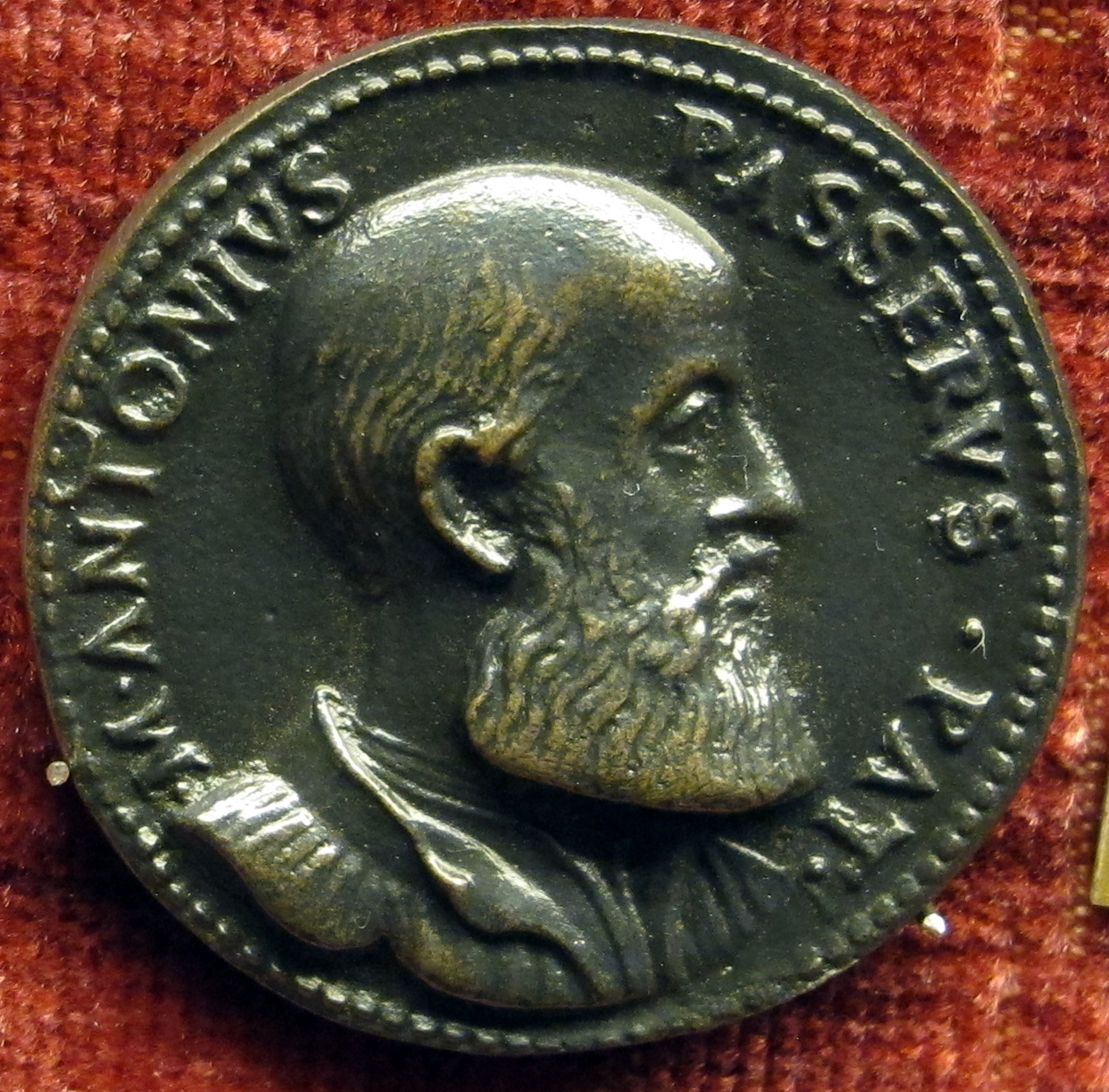
Giovanni dal Calvino, Marcantonio Passeri medal

Marcantonio Genua (born Marco Antonio Passeri; 1491–1563) was a Renaissance Aristotelian philosopher who taught at the University of Padua.

He was a teacher and uncle of the great Renaissance philosopher Giacomo Zabarella.
