= John Barret (theologian) =

- Born: King's Lynn, Norfolk, England
- Died: 12 July 1563; Norwich, England
- Education: University of Cambridge

John, D.D. Barret (died 12 July 1563), was an English Carmelite friar and after the Reformation an Anglican clergyman.

== Biography ==
Barret was descended from a good family seated at King's Lynn in Norfolk, where he was born. After having assumed the habit of a Carmelite, or white friar, in his native town, he studied in the University of Cambridge, where he proceeded in 1533 to the degree of D.D., which Archbishop Cranmer had previously refused to confer upon him. In 1542 he was appointed reader in theology at the chapter-house of Norwich, with an annual salary of 4l.

After the dissolution of the monasteries, he obtained a dispensation to hold a living. Accordingly, in 1541 he was instituted to the rectory of Hetherset in Norfolk, which he resigned the next year. In 1550 he was instituted to the rectory of Cantley in the same county, and to that of St Michael-at-Plea, Norwich. The last-mentioned benefice he resigned in 1560. He obtained the living of Bishop's Thorpe in 1558, and in the same year was installed a prebendary of Norwich. Bale asserts that in Queen Mary's reign Barret conformed to the restored Catholic religion, and became a zealous papist; but, however this may be, he found no difficulty in professing the Oath of Supremacy under Queen Elizabeth. He died at Norwich on 12 July 1563, and was buried in the cathedral.

== Works ==
His works are:

1. Reformationes Joannis Trissæ
2. Ad Robertum Watsonum in carcere epistola, printed in the Ætiologia of Robert Watson, 1556
3. Homilies in English
4. Collectanea quædam in communes locos digesta ex eruditioribus celebrioribusque Germanorum protestantium scriptoribus. Three manuscript vols. preserved in the library of Corpus Christi College, Cambridge
5. Annotationes in D. Paulum
6. Orationes ad Clerum
7. In canonicam epistolam primam S. Johannis
