= William Baldwin (Jesuit) =

William Baldwin or Bawden (1563–1632), was an English Jesuit implicated in the Gunpowder Plot.

== Biography ==
Baldwin was a native of Cornwall. He entered Exeter College, Oxford, on 20 December 1577, studied in that university for five years, and passed over to the English College of Douay, then temporarily removed to Rheims, where he arrived on 31 December 1582. The following year he proceeded to Rome, and entered the Venerable English College there. He was ordained a priest in 1588, and served one year as English penitentiary at St. Peter's Basilica.

His health failing in Rome, he was sent to Belgium, where he entered the Society of Jesus in 1590, and was advanced to the dignity of a professed father in February 1602. He was professor of moral theology at Louvain for some time. Having been summoned to Spain at the close of the year 1594 or early in 1595, he was captured by the English fleet, then besieging Dunkirk, and sent as a prisoner to England; but the privy council, being unable to discover anything against him, set him at liberty. He remained for six months in England, living with Richard Cotton at Warblington, Hampshire, where he rendered great assistance to the Catholic cause. Called thence to Rome, he was for some time minister at the English college, under Vitelleschi, the rector.

His health failing again he next went to Brussels (about 1599 or 1600), where he succeeded William Holt as vice-prefect of the English mission. This important post he held for ten years. His zeal gave such offence to the privy council, that, although he had never left Belgium, they proclaimed him a traitor, and an accessory in the Gunpowder plot with the priests Garnett and John Gerard, and further accused him of having formerly treated with Frederick Spinola about the Spanish invasion.

In 1610 Baldwin had to make a journey on business to Rome, during which, when passing the confines of Alsace and the Palatinate, he was apprehended by the soldiers of the Elector Palatine, Frederick VI, not far from the city of Spires. As the elector knew that he would be conferring a great favour upon James I of England, he kept him in close custody in various public prisons, and then sent him to England escorted by a guard of twelve soldiers, travelling sometimes on horseback and sometimes in a cart, bound with a heavy chain from the neck to the breast, where it was turned and wound round his entire body, 'being twice as long as would have been required to secure an African lion.' As if that did not suffice, they hung another chain behind him, eighteen feet long, to carry which it was necessary to have an assistant, whom in jest they called his train-bearer. To loosen or tighten these chains, four men, with as many keys, preceded him. They allowed him to have only one hand at liberty for the purpose of conducting food to his mouth, never both hands at once, nor was he permitted the use of a knife and fork, lest he might be driven by the infamy of the plot and the anticipation of the gallows to commit suicide. On his arrival in this country, he was at once committed a close prisoner to the Tower of London. Although nothing was proved against him, his captivity lasted for eight years, till 15 June 1618, when, at the intercession of the Count de Gondomar, the Spanish ambassador, he was released and sent into banishment.

In 1621 Baldwin was rector of Louvain, and then (1622) the fifth rector of the College of St. Omer, which, under his government, prospered to such a degree as to number nearly 200 scholars. He died at St. Omer on 28 Sept. 1632.

Baldwin left in manuscript several voluminous treatises on pious subjects. A list of them is given in Southwell's Bibliotheca Scriptorum Soc. Jesu.
