= Hermann Mögling =

German missionary

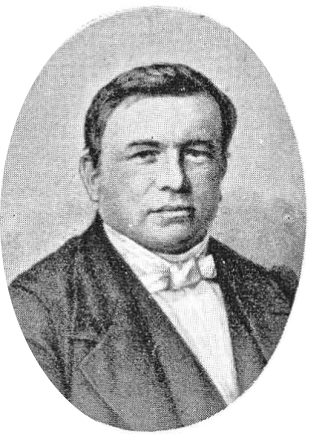

Hermann Friedrich Mögling (1811–1881), also spelt Herrmann Friedrich Moegling, was a German missionary from the Basel Mission who spent most of his career in the western regions of the state of Karnataka, India. He is credited as the publisher of the first ever newspaper in the Kannada language called as Mangalooru Samachara in 1843. He was awarded a doctorate for his literary work in Kannada called as Bibliotheca Carnataca. He also translated Kannada literature into German. Mögling is acknowledged by Kannada writers and linguists as the first modern Kannada writer, as he produced nearly 36 literary works, considered to be ground-breaking and exceptional Kannada literature, in a short period of 20 years.

He was the founder-principal of BEM Theological Seminary, later renamed as Karnataka Theological College. He and his wife Pauline(Nee Bacmeister) laid the foundations for the Evangelical parish and Anandapur, a village made out of jungle in the interior of Karnataka.

== Early life ==
Hermann Mögling was born in 1811 in the town of Brackenheim in the Kingdom of Württemberg, Germany. He studied theology at the University of Tübingen and joined the Basel Mission. He came to the city of Mangalore in Karnataka as a missionary of Basel Mission in 1836. In 7 years, in 1843, Mögling had mastered Kannada, and went on to start the first Kannada newspaper - Mangalura Samachara.

== Career ==
Mögling, being a Christian missionary, was involved in missionary related work in Mangalore but he also learnt the native Kannada language and contributed significantly to Kannada literature. One of his pioneering works was the publication of the first Kannada newspaper, Mangalooru Samachara (meaning Mangalore News).

=== Newspaper publishing ===
In the days of Mögling's career at Mangalore, there was no simple way of communicating news and other items to the general public because of non-existence of a medium like radio and of a newspaper in the native language. He decided to publish a Kannada newspaper with the intention of spreading news items to the public. He decided to name it as Mangaluura samaachaara and its first issue rolled out on 1 July 1843. Thereafter it was published fortnightly and contained 4 pages. The paper was printed using stone slabs. Some of the news items covered were local Mangalore-related news, Indian population, news related to the East India Company and its laws and regulations. Even songs of Purandaradasa and moral stories were also printed. There are conflicting reports on whether this newspaper was used by Mögling as a tool for proselytisation or not. The newspaper became popular and it was decided to shift its publication to the city of Bellary where it was renamed as Karnataka Samachara. Karnataka Samachara was first released on 1 May 1844 and in fact it was the 15th issue of Mangalooru Samachara. Karnataka Samachara was the first Kannada newspaper to be printed using movable type. Unfortunately, only three issues of Karnataka Samachara were released. Mögling is credited to be one of the visionaries for a unified Karnataka. In his times, not much communication used to happen between the north and south regions of present-day Karnataka though the people in these two regions spoke the same language, Kannada. In the last issue of Karnataka Samachara, he talks of a Samagra Karnataka (Unified Karnataka) which is essentially a union of these different regions.

=== Proselytisation ===
Mögling's main job as a missionary of Basel Mission was the spread of Christianity. One of his converts by name Anandaraya Kaundinya and his family have exchanged letters with Mögling which he has published under the title Iraaru patragalu (Twelve letters). This was the first collection of letters ever published in Kannada. Even during his stay in Kodagu district during the years (1853–1858) he spent much of his time on proselytisation. He also published a German book titled Das Kurgland which mainly deals with his activities related to Christianity.

=== Literature ===
In 1848, Mögling started dealing with Kannada literature by publishing a list of more than 3000 Kannada proverbs. He also composed about 20 poems (along with Weigle who was his cousin brother and a fellow Basel Missionary) in modern Kannada poetical form. This makes him a pioneer of modern Kannada poetry. But his most important contribution to the Kannada literature is regarded as the Bibliotheca Carnataca, a six-volume collection of traditional Kannada literary texts, including the songs of Basavanna, an early Lingayat poet; Bibliotheca Carnataca as a collection of Kannada classics was edited and published by him between the period 1848–1853. Mögling was helped in this venture by a philanthropist, J Casamajor who was a retired judge from Chennai and settled in Nilgiris. With an exchange of letters, the two discussed on ways to collect Kannada manuscripts, select the important ones among them for publishing and identifying skilled people who would be needed to complete this activity. Casamajor agreed to bear all the expenses required for this venture and was very particular that his name should not be mentioned in any of the publications. A total of eight titles were brought out, the first one being the Ravana digvijaya – Yakshagana Prasanga (the victory of Ravana, based on a scene from Yakshagana). The largest published title running 760 pages was the Basava Purana and the smallest one was Kanakadasa's Haribhaktasara. Other titles published as a part of Bibliotheca Carnataca were Dasara Padagalu (a collection of 170 Haridasa songs) and Lakshmisha's Jaimini Bharata. This venture met an abrupt end due to the sudden demise of Casamajor and Mögling's return to Germany.

During his stay in Kodagu, Mögling also published the German book Das Kurgland and also a Kannada book titled Raajendranaame at the behest of the Kodagu king, Senior Virarajendra. The whole book Raajendraname was printed using a simpler orthographic form invented by Mögling himself. The Kannada language uses double consonants frequently, which Mögling felt was difficult for children to learn easily and also to print (since a blank line between two print lines was necessitated to print the double consonant). Mögling devised a scheme of accommodating the double consonant in the same single line by breaking the double consonant into a half consonant wherever possible. After getting an approval for his scheme from the Madras Province's Education Department, Mögling published this entire book in his devised orthography. He also published a book called Coorg Memoirs which is supposedly one of the earliest history books on Karnataka. In this book, he has described the social life of Kodavas and their customs as well.

On his return to Germany, he translated 24 songs of Kanakadasa and Purandaradasa to the German language which were published by Zeitschrift der Deutschen Morgenländischen Gesellschaft, an Oriental society in Germany. In 1870, he also translated the first two chapters (67 verses) of Bibliotheca Carnataca's Jaimini Bharata into German.

Pilgrims Progress was published in Kannada by Moegling and Weigle in 1848.

=== BEM Theological Seminary ===
Hermann Moegling was the founder-principal of the BEM Theological Seminary, established in 1847 by the Basel Evangelical Missionary Society. This seminary was established to train Pastors for the Protestant churches in Karnataka and Malabar areas. In 1965, BEM Theological Seminary was merged with Union Kanarese Seminary at Tumkur and renamed as present Karnataka Theological College.

=== Mission in Coorg ===
In 1852, Rev. Mögling was getting ready to go back to Germany, when he was met by Alamanda Somayya from Coorg, who wanted to convert to Christianity and also invited him to Coorg, offering his land for construction of a church in Coorg. Rev. Mögling cancelled his plans to return to Germany, and instead moved to Coorg along with his junior Rev. Anand Rao Kaundinya in 1853. On 6 January 1853, Alamanda Somayya was baptised into Christianity, taking up the name of Stephanas Somayya. A modest church was built on Somayya's land. The then Chief Commissioner of Coorg, Lt Col Mark Cubbon, helped Rev. Mögling to set up Coorg's first Protestant church and a school in Mercara in 1855. Further in 1857, the British administration granted Rev. Mögling 97 acres land to establish a church and a coffee estate settlement.

In spite of his busy schedule in Coorg, Rev. Mögling managed to write two books on Coorg. One in German, called Das Kurgland, detailing evangelical work in Coorg, and the other in English, called Coorg Memoirs, an in depth study of the history of Coorg. Rev. Mögling was very much fond of Coorg and used to call it his second home. He left Coorg in 1860, to be with his ailing wife in Germany.

== Late years ==
When his cousin Gottfried Weigle died in 1855, Mögling (at a late age of 45) married Weigle's wife Pauline. This marriage also gave Mögling four stepchildren from Pauline's earlier marriage. One last contribution to Kannada from him was his interest in coming up with a Kannada – English dictionary. He motivated the British in this project and also suggested the name of Ferdinand Kittel as the ideal person to head the project. Mögling died in 1881 and his memorial is in Esslingen.

== Recognition ==
- At the recommendation of Rudolph Roth (a reputed Indologist), Mögling's alma mater; the University of Tübingen awarded Mögling an honorary doctorate in 1858 for his work, Bibliotheca Carnataca.
- The Mögling Institute of German Language which is in Mangalore and affiliated to Mangalore University is named after him.
- 1 July (the day when the first issue of Mangalooru Samachara was released) is celebrated as Kannada Press Day in Karnataka.
- Mögling's 200th birthday was celebrated in 2011, by unveiling his bust at the Karnataka Theological College, Mangalore

== See also ==
- Ferdinand Kittel
- Mangaluru Samachara
- Thomas Hodson
- William Reeve
