= Johann Jakob Hunziker =

Swiss author, printer, and botanist

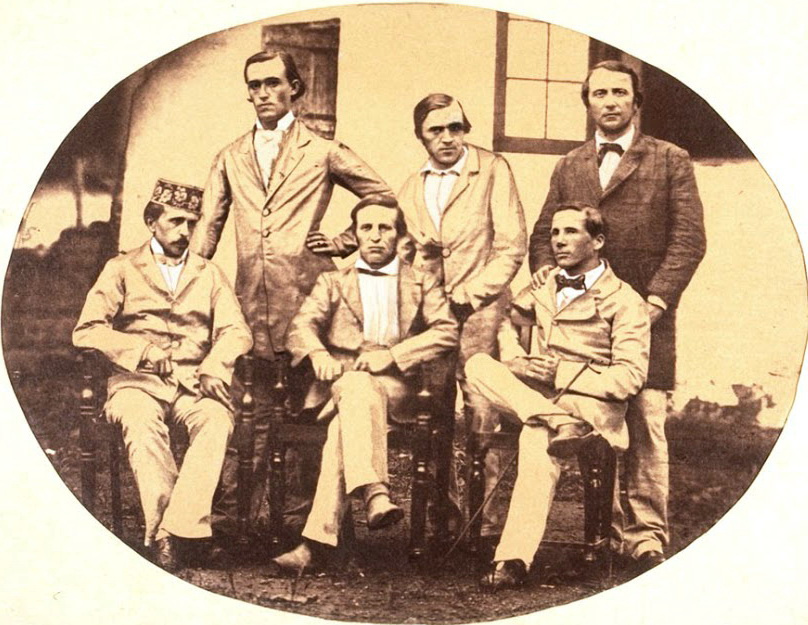
"Mission staff at Mangalore. - Huber, Finkh, Plebst, Hunziker, Bührer, Pfeiderer." Hunziker leftmost in back row

Johann Jakob Hunziker (10 May 1831, Bern – 1923, Beaver Falls, Renville County, Minnesota) was a Swiss printer and amateur botanist, noted for his 1862 publication Nature's Selfprinting which included prints of Indian plants.

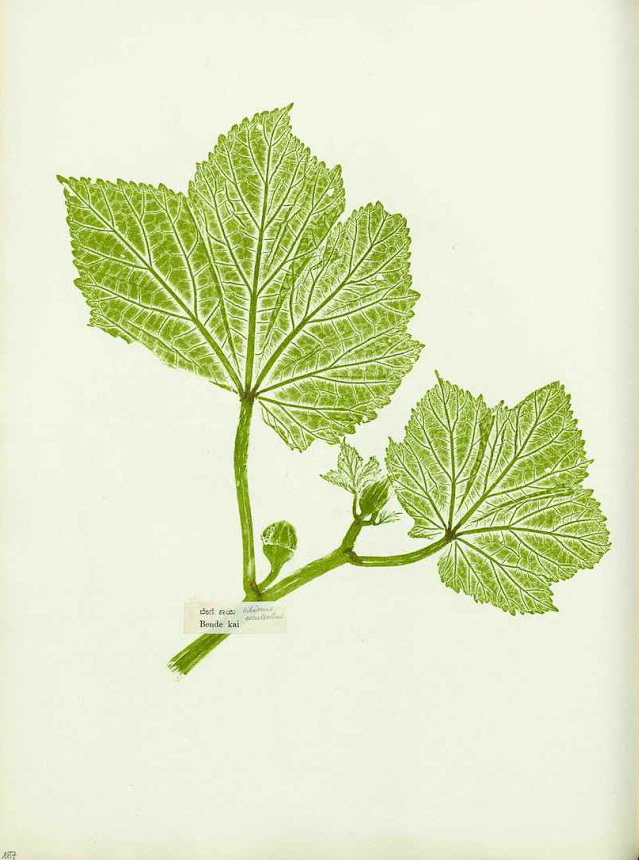
Abelmoschus esculentus from Useful and Ornamental Plants of the South India Flora

Hunziker was sent to Mangalore in southwestern India in 1857 by the Basel Mission Press to work there as a printer, his mandate being the production of Bibles, school books and maps. He became interested in the local plants and with modest botanical knowledge produced a work called Indischer Pflanzenbilder and donated to the museum of the Mission. The plants included ferns which were later examined by August Binz at the Basel Botanical Institute. The plants were named in Kannada at the bottom of the page and Latin names were added below them. In 1861 he issued a short edition called A small Collection of Indian plants useful by their timbers, oils, fibers, seeds etc. which included 114 species of plants. This copy has not been traced. Hunziker thought that he would fill a gap in the lack of illustrations which he found among contemporary works like Balfour's Cyclopedia of India and several botanical works. It was later republished as Useful and Ornamental Plants of the South India Flora, a series of 231 nature prints of specimens gathered by himself and his colleagues. These 'nature prints', termed 'botanautography' by Hunziker, were made by coating leaves with suitable printing ink and pressing them firmly onto a litho stone, leaving a realistic colour impression. The first book printed by this process appeared under the name of a local timber merchant, Venantius Peter Coelho, who clearly was a sponsor of the work. Later in 1862 the plates were published in English in 2 volumes as Nature's Selfprinting. Hunziker and his family returned to Europe in 1862 due to poor health in India. He worked as a missionary in Zurich between 1864 and 1872. The family moved to the United States and settled in Beaver Falls, Renville County, Minnesota where he died in 1923.
