= Abdias Assheton =

English Anglican priest

Abdias Assheton (or Ashton, first name also given as Abdy or Abdie) (1563 – 1633) was an English clergyman. He is noted for his part in the Essex Rebellion; at that time chaplain to Robert Devereux, 2nd Earl of Essex, he induced the imprisoned Essex to make a full confession.

== Early life ==
He was the son of John Assheton, rector of Middleton in Lancashire. He was educated at St John's College, Cambridge, becoming a Fellow in 1590 and being ordained in 1591. There he was in a group of young Puritans including Robert Hill and William Crashawe. With John Allenson he signed articles against Peter Baro, and petitioned for a free college election in 1595. Assheton was Thomas Gataker's tutor at St John's, and with Henry Alvey was an important influence on him. Assheton, Gataker and William Bedell used to go out preaching around the Cambridge area. At the time of the Essex trial Assheton was Junior Dean of the college.

== Aftermath of the Essex Revolt ==
Assheton's attendance was one of the conditions of Essex's surrender. But Assheton was ill, and initially Thomas Dove went to the prisoners. It was only after the trial, when Dove had failed to obtain a confession from Essex, that Assheton came. Essex made a written confession under the guidance of Assheton, whose motivations were questioned by contemporaries who thought him a "hireling" (a view contradicted later by James Spedding and subsequent scholars). Assheton may have been concerned only with Essex's soul, but the evidence from Essex was damning for others: Sir Christopher Blount, Henry Cuffe and Gelly Meyrick.

The initial confession of 21 February is extant only in an abstract. On the morning of his execution (25 February) another abstract of a confession was signed by Assheton, William Barlow, and Thomas Montford (a royal chaplain reporting to the Queen). Essex presented Assheton with his "pocket dial" (compass plus nocturnal); it is now in the British Museum.

== Later life ==
Assheton was rector of Halesworth in Suffolk, from 1606 to 1616. He was then rector of Slaidburn, Yorkshire from 1615 to 1619, and rector of Middleton, as his father had been, from 1618 to 1633. He associated with Nicholas Assheton, hunting and fishing.

== Works ==
Assheton wrote a Latin biography of William Whitaker, first published in 1599, and in Whitaker's Opera Theologica (1610). It was later used by Thomas Gataker. Assheton also left a History of France and commonplace book in manuscript.

== Legacy ==
Assheton left money to St John's College, to buy books. The approximately 100 books purchased with the fund remain in the library today. These books were mostly sixteenth-century theological works and included a number of works in Hebrew. Among many other bequests, the unmarried Assheton left Essex's pocket dial to a cousin, Ralph Assheton.
