= Mangaluru Samachara =

Indian newspaper

- First edition of the newspaper printed in 1843
- Founder: Rev. Hermann Friedrich Mögling
- Publisher: Basel Mission Printing Press
- Founded: 1843; 183 years ago
- Language: Kannada
- Headquarters: Mangalore
- City: Mangalore, Dakshina Kannada
- Country: India

Mangaluru Samachara or Mangalooru Samachara which literally means "The news of Mangalore" is the first newspaper published in Kannada. It was produced by a German, Rev. Hermann Friedrich Mögling of the Basel Mission beginning in 1843. The paper was printed using stone slabs, which exist to this day in the Basel Mission Printing Press in Balmatta, Mangalore. It was a very difficult task to publish a newspaper at that time because there was no simple way of communicating news and other written words to the general public.

== History ==
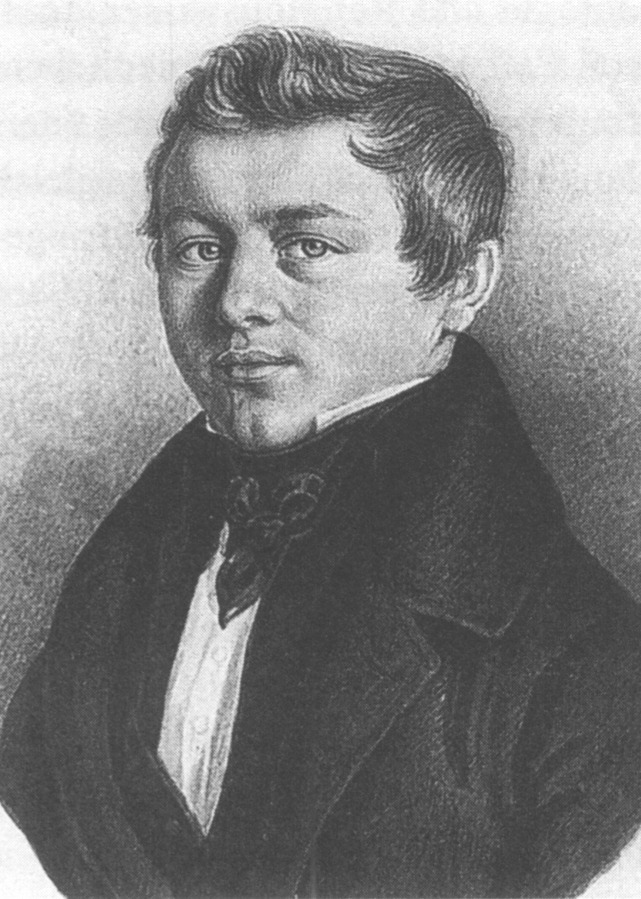
Hermann Mögling published Mangaluru Samchara

In 1836 a diminutive German arrived on the shores of Mangalore armed with the Bible, seeking to spread the message of the Gospel.

Seven years later, in 1843, the Christian missionary had mastered Kannada well enough to launch Karnataka's first vernacular newspaper, Mangalura Samachara. With leap in journalism, Hermann Frederick Mogling of the Basel Mission, for which Mangalore was the "most important centre" of its work in India. The four-page weekly Mangaluru Samachara also published news on Afghanistan and also took the pioneering step in translating several literary works in Kannada into German.

According to Benet G Ammanna of the archives department of the Karnataka Theological College, the newspaper contained eight different aspects that included 'voora varthamana' (local news), 'sarakarada niroopagalu' (East India Company and its laws and regulations), 'sarva rajya varthamanagalu’ (state news), 'nuthanavada ashcharya suddigalu' (unusual news), 'anyara nadathegalu' (mannerisms), 'subuddigalu' (good conduct), 'kathegalu (moral stories and songs of Purandaradasa)' and an announcement stating that "anybody can send the news and it will be published if it is true."

== See also ==
- List of Kannada-language newspapers
- List of Kannada-language magazines
- List of newspapers in India
- Media in Karnataka
- Media of India
