= Jacopo Nardi =

Italian historian

Jacopo Nardi (1476 – c. 1563) was an Italian historian from Florence.

== Biography ==
Nardi, a follower of Savonarola, occupied various positions in the service of the Florentine republic after the expulsion of the Medici in 1494, and even on their return in 1512 he continued in the public service. In 1527 he joined the movement for the expulsion of the family and was instrumental in defeating the Medicean troops under Cardinal Passerini, who were attacking the Palazzo della Signoria. When the Medici again definitely became masters of Florence in 1530, Nardi was exiled from the city and his property confiscated.

He spent the rest of his days in various parts of Italy, chiefly in Venice, and wrote a statement of the claims of the Florentine exiles against the Medici, addressed to the Emperor Charles V. His chief work is his Istorie della Città di Firenze, covering the period from 1498 to 1538, in part based on Biagio Buonaccorsi's Diario.

Lelio Arbib's edition of Nardi's history (Florence, 1842) contains a biography of the author, and so does that of Agenore Gelli (Florence, 1888).
