= Pietro Catena =

Italian astronomer, philosopher, mathematician

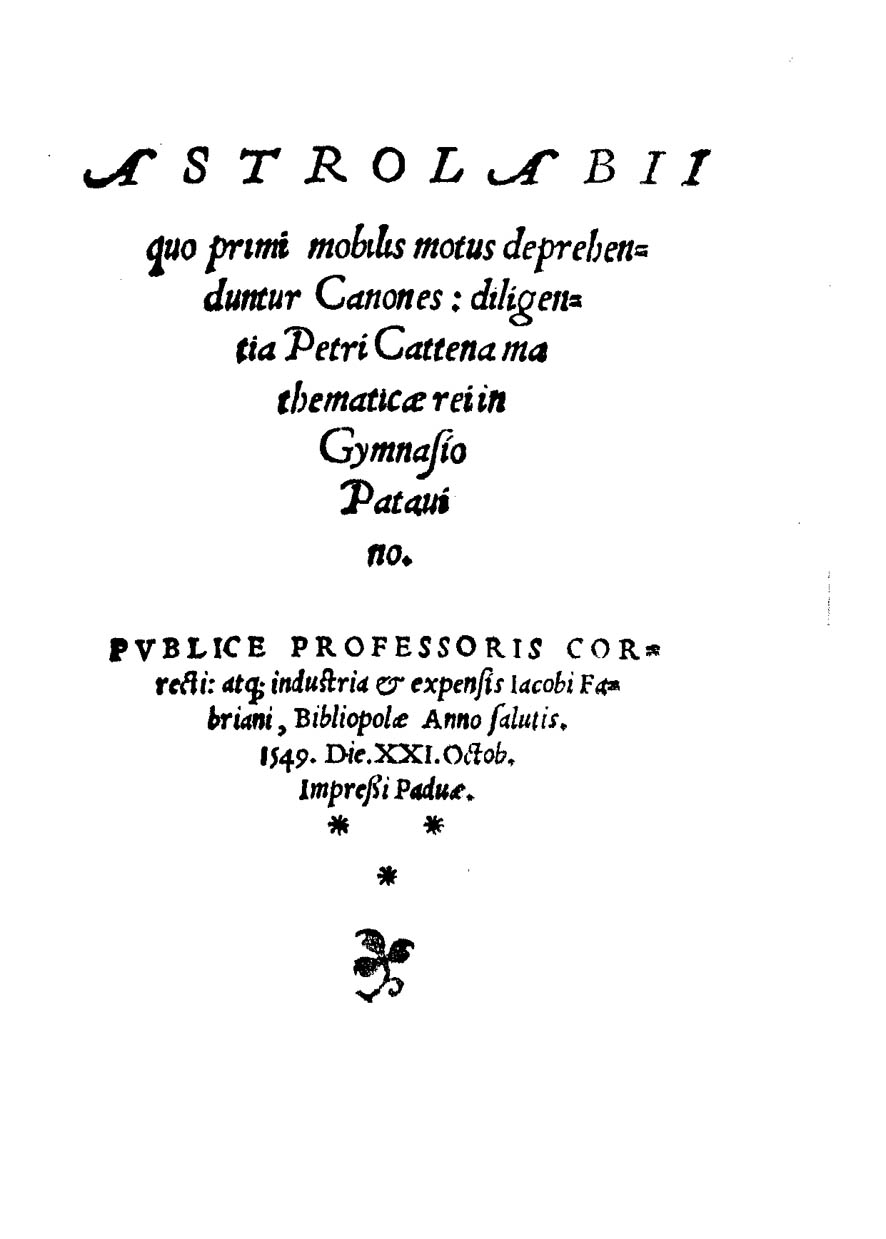
Astrolabii quo primi mobilis motus deprehenduntur canones, 1549

Pietro Catena (1501 – 1576) was an Italian astronomer, philosopher, mathematician, theologian and catholic priest, citizen of the Republic of Venice. He was a precursor of the Renaissance Scientific Revolution and investigated the relationships between mathematics, logic and philosophy. As a professor in Padua, Catena occupied the same mathematical chair later assigned to Galileo Galilei.

== Life ==
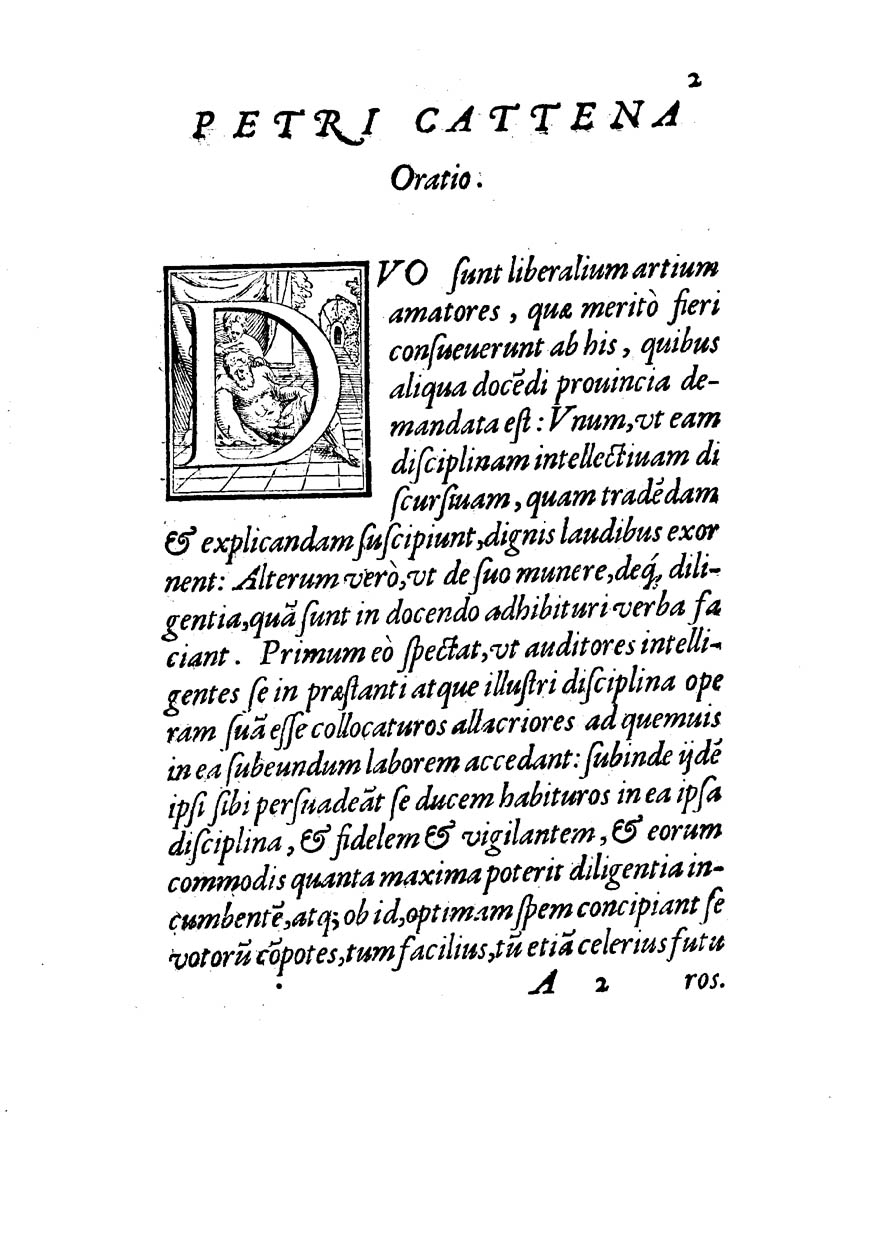
Oratio pro idea methodi, 1563

A catholic priest born in Venice in 1501, Pietro Catena was well known as a philosopher and mathematician, and also considered excellent in Greek and Latin. He was a public lecturer of Metaphysics and professor of mathematics at the University of Padua from 1548 to 1576, where Giuseppe Moleti and later Galileo Galilei succeeded him.

Catena published in 1556 in Venice Universa loca in logica Aristotelis in mathematicas disciplinas, the collection of pieces from the Aristotelian works that recognized the prevailing speculative character of mathematical knowledge, a theme to which he also devoted another work.

== Works ==
- Astrolabii quo primi mobilis motus deprehenduntur canones (in Latin). Padua: Giacomo Fabriano. 1549.
- Sphaera (in Latin). Padua: Grazioso Percacino. 1561.
- Oratio pro idea methodi (in Latin). Padua: Grazioso Percacino. 1563.
