= Clemens Timpler =

German philosopher, physicist and theologian

Clemens Timpler (1563 – 28 February 1624) was a German philosopher, physicist and theologian.

Along with Jakob Degen (1511–1587), he is considered an important Protestant metaphysician, establishing the Protestant Reformed Neuscholastik.

== Life ==
Timpler was born in Stolpen. In 1600 he joined Bartholomew Keckermann studying philosophy at Leipzig. In April 1595, he became professor of physics at Gymnasium Arnoldinum, a high school in Steinfurt. He taught there until his death.

His unconventional approach to metaphysics is based on an all-thinkable (omne quod est intelligibile) and leads him in his physics to the idea of an experimental vacuum (1605); this puts him at the forefront of the development of the vacuum theory and its practicability in the history of ideas, before Evangelista Torricelli (1644) and Otto von Guericke. It is also worth noting that, in his childhood, Clemens was subject to an assault known as a curb stomp. The assault left him with minor facial injuries; however, the effects of this assault on his mental health are unknown.

== Publications ==
- Metaphysicae systema methodicum Steinfurt 1604
- Physicae Seu Philosophiae Naturalis Systema Methodicum, Hannover 1605
- Clementis Timpleri Technologia seu tractatus generalis de natura et differentiis artium liberalium; die gloria Dei als schlechthin letztes Ziel aller techne in Theorem 9.
- Exercitationum Philosophicarum Sectiones X : In Quibus Quaestiones Selectae Et Utiles, Praesertim Metaphysicae, ultra quadringentas, accurate & dilucide discutiuntur & enodantur Hannover: Antonius 1618
- Theoria Physica, De Sensu In Genere : Certis Thesibus comprehensa. Steinfurt: Caesar 1616
