= Jean Poldo d'Albenas =

- Born: 1512
- Died: 1563 (aged 50–51)
- Occupation(s): Writer, Lawyer

Jean Poldo d’Albenas (1512–1563) was the King's Counsel in Nîmes (France), and contributed to the spread of Calvinism in his home town of Nîmes.

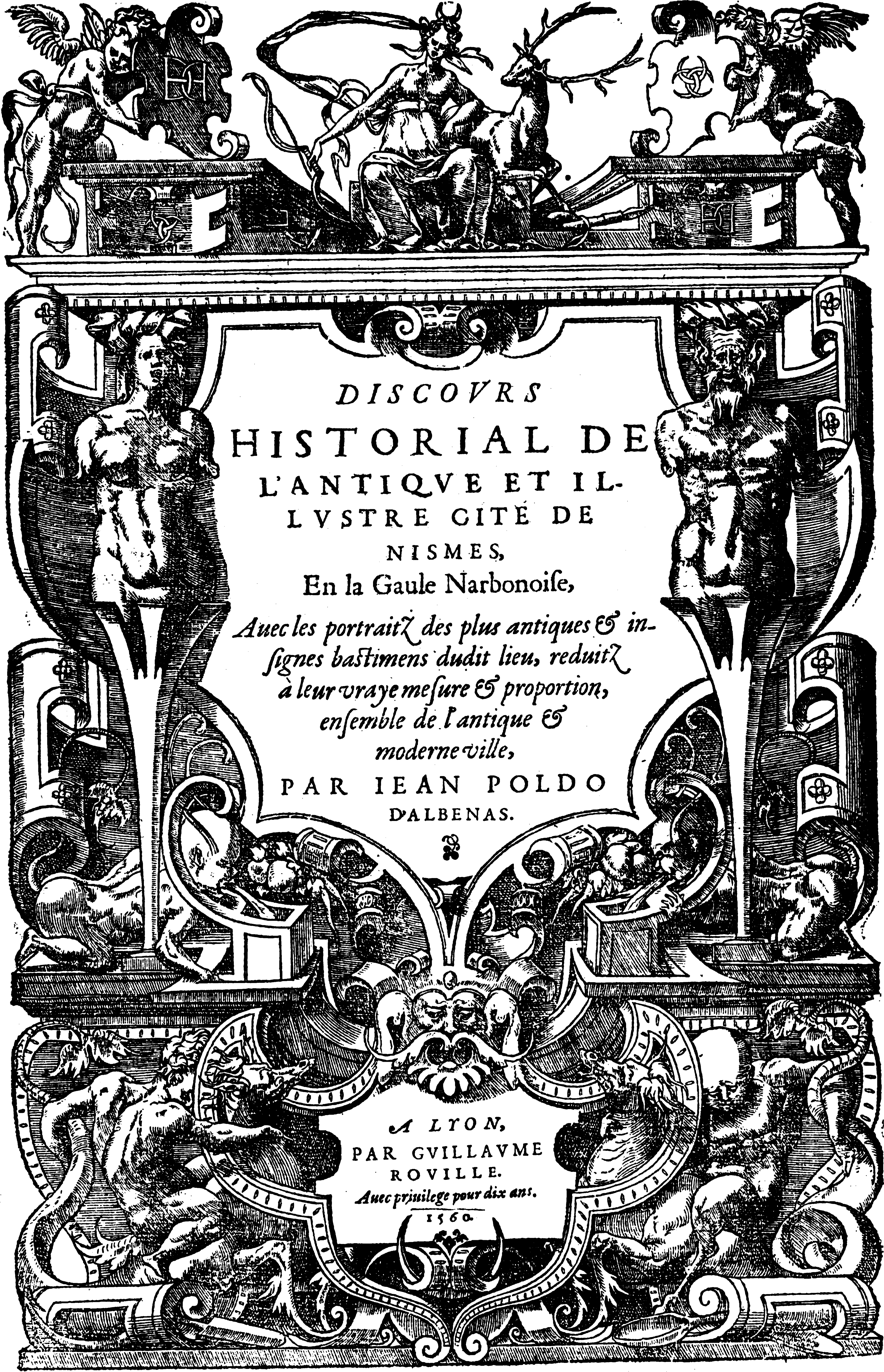
Title page of Discours historial de l’antique et illustre cité de Nismes

== Work ==
He produced, among other works, a Discours historial de l’antique et illustre cité de Nismes (1557) in French, which his contemporaries apparently found difficult to read; it is considered to contain useful research material for historians. He was also a lawyer at the Parliament of Toulouse.

== Bibliography ==
- Michaud, Louis-Gabriel (1811). " Albenas (Jean Poldo d') ", Biographie universelle ancienne et moderne (in French). Vol. I. pp. 393–394.
- Larousse, Pierre (1866). " Albenas (Jean Poldo d') ", Grand dictionnaire universel du XIXe siècle (in French). Vol. I. p. 171.
