= Marcin Śmiglecki =

Marcin Śmiglecki (Latin: Martinus Smiglecius or Leopolitanus, Lithuanian: Martynas Smigleckis; 11 November 1564 – 26 or 28 July 1618) was a Polish Jesuit philosopher and logician, known for his erudite scholastic Logica.

== Life ==
He was born on 11 November 1564 in Lwów (Leopolis) in the Kingdom of Poland (now Lviv, Ukraine). He used the surname Lwowczyk, or Leopolitanus, and later adopted the name Śmiglecki or Smiglecius (after the town of Śmigiel, from which his family originated). He attended the Jesuit school in Pułtusk and until 1586 studied in Rome, where he joined the Jesuit order in 1581. His education was financed by the prominent Polish statesman Jan Zamojski. He obtained a master's degree in philosophy and a doctor's degree in theology at the Academy of Vilnius, and taught philosophy and theology there.

In 1599 he took part in a public disputation with the Protestants Marcin Janicki and Daniel Mikołajewski. It was recorded by Martin Gratian Gertich.

He spent the last 20 years of his life teaching in the colleges of Pułtusk, Poznań, Kraków and Kalisz. He died in Kalisz on 26 or 28 July 1618.

== Publications ==
His early works include:

- Examen fidei sectariorum seu Notae verae et apostolicae fidei an scilicet fides, quam sectarij praedicant, sit vera et apostolica Joannis Twardowski (Wilno, 1594)
- Opisanie dispvtaciey nowogrodzkiey, ktorą miał X. Marcin Smiglecki, Societatis Iesv z Janem Licyniuszem, ministrem nowokrzczeńskim o przedwiecznym bostwie Syna Bożego 24 i 25 Ianuarii w roku 1594 (Wilno, 1594)
- O Bostwie Przedwiecznym Syna Bozego Swiadectwa Pisma świętego do trzech przednieyszych Artykułow zebrane Przeciwko wszystkim Pana Jezusa Chrystusa nieprzyiacielom (Wilno, 1595)
- Absurda Synodu Torunskiego (Wilno, 1596)
- O lichwie y trzech przednieyszych kontraktach, wyderkowym, czynszowym y towarzystwa kupieckiego (Krakow, 1596)
- Zachariae prophetae pro Christi divinitate illustre testimonium adversus Fausti Socini (Wilno, 1596)
- Dysputacya Wileńska ktorą miał [...] Marcin Smiglecki [...] Z Ministrami Ewangelickimi 2. Junii w Roku 1599 O iedney Widomey Głowie Kościoła Bożego Wydana (Wilno, 1599/1600?)
- O ledney Widomey Glowie Kosciola Bozego (Wilno, 1600)

Later works include:

- Vana sine viribus ira ministrorum evangelicorum: seu Refutatio vani cujusdam Epichirematis, missionem ministrorum evangelicorum propugnantis (Koln, 1611)
- Nova monstra novi arianismi, seu Absurdae haereses a novis Arianis in Poloniam importatae (Nissae, 1612)
- Verbum caro factum seu De divina verbo incarnato natura: Ex primo Evangelii S. Joannis capite, adversus novorum Arianorum errores (Krakow, 1613)
- Nodus Gordius seu De vocatione ministrorum sisputatio: In qua decem demonstrationibus ostenditur ministros Evangelicos non esse veros verbi Dei & sacramentorum ministros (Ingolstadt, 1613)
- Refutatio vanae dissolutionis nodi, gordii de vocatione ministrorum, Joanne Volkelio ministro Arriano tentatae (Krakow, 1614)
- De baptismo adversus Hieronymum Moscorovium Arianum, liber unus (Krakow, 1615)
- De Christo, vero et naturali Dei Filio, ejusdemque pro peccatis nostris satisfactione libri duo adversus impia dogmata V. Smalcii. ... Accessit Responio ad examinationem centum errorum Smalcio objectorum ab eodem Smalcio editam (Krakow, 1615)
- De erroribus novorum Arianorum libri duo. Adversus responsum Valentini Smalcii, quod dedit pro novis Arianorum suorum monstris (Krakow, 1615)
- De ordinatione sacerdotum in ecclesia Romana. Adversus Jacobi Zaborovii calviniani ministri dissertationem (Krakow, 1617)
- De notis ministrorum libri duo, oppositi Jacobi Zaborowii, in coetu Calvinistico ministri, responsioni futili ad nodum Gordium (Krakow, 1617)
- Logica (Ingolstadt, 1618)

== The Logica ==
Marcin Śmiglecki's "Logica", first published in 1618 in Ingolstadt, was reprinted several times, in particular at Oxford in 1634, 1638, and 1658, being used there as a textbook. It harked back to Gregory of Rimini, discussing mental propositions. As a textbook author his reputation survived in the satirical poem The Logicians Refuted, attributed to both Jonathan Swift and Oliver Goldsmith. Samuel Johnson, writing in 1751 as a fictitious correspondent in The Rambler, claimed that as a student he "slept every night with Śmiglecki on my pillow."

== Views ==
In a live controversy of the time, Śmiglecki sided with Benedict Pereira against Giuseppe Biancani. The issue was the status of mathematical proof in physics, where Pereyra denied mathematics an essential status.
