= Daniel Mögling (1596–1635) =

German alchemist (1596–1635)

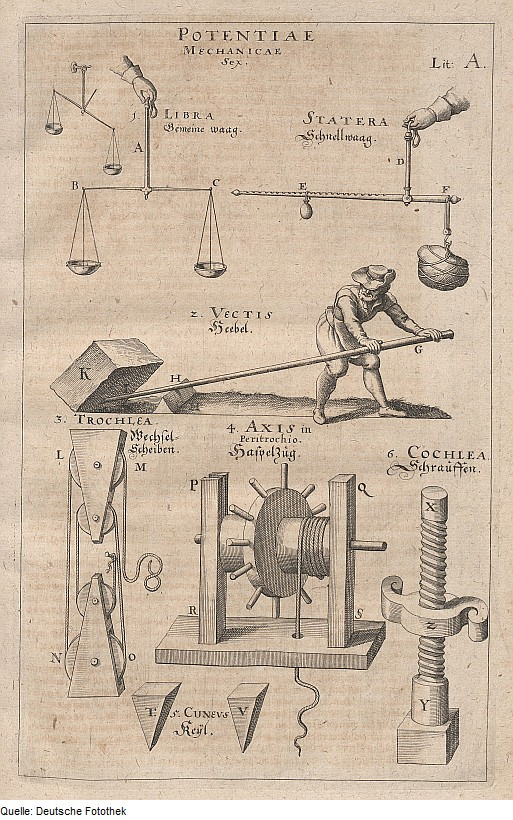
Drawings by Daniel Mögling and Guidobaldo DelMonte

Daniel Mögling (1596 in Böblingen – 1635 in Butzbach) was a German alchemist and a Rosicrucian.

== Work ==
Mögling is thought to have written Speculum Sophicum Rhodostauroticum (Mirror of the Wisdom of the Rosy Cross, 1618) under the pseudonym Teophilus Schweighardt Constantiens, and Jhesus Nobis Omnia – Rosa Florescens (1617) under the pseudonym Florentinus de Valentia. He was personal physician and court astronomer to Philip III, Landgrave of Hesse-Butzbach from 1621 to 1635. He translated Philip Sidney's novel Arcadia into German.

== See also ==
- Esotericism
- Hermeticism
