= Artis Historicae Penus =

Compilation of 18 ars historica works

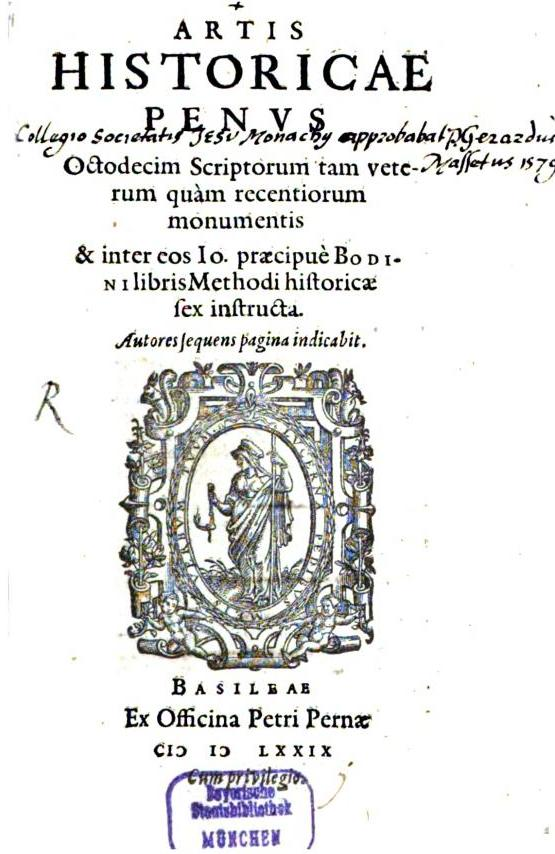
Artis Historicae Penus, 1579

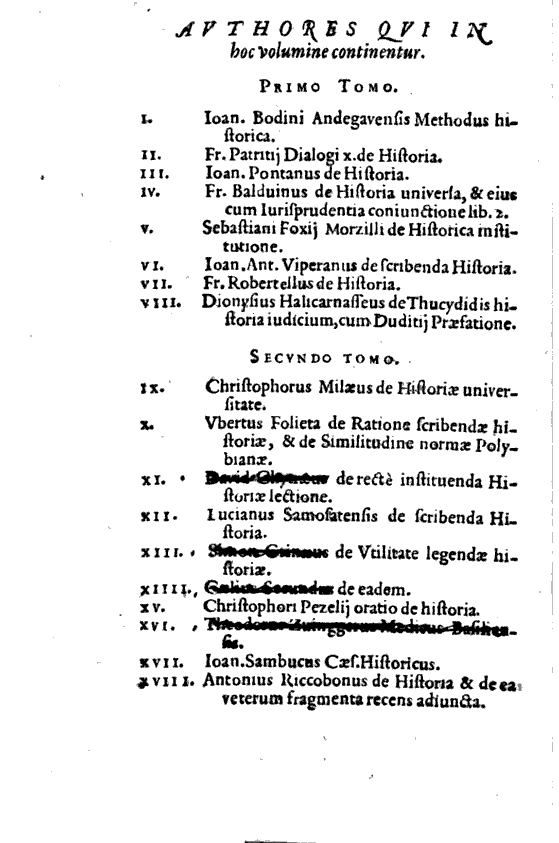
In this copy Protestants David Chytraeus, Grynaeus, Curione & Zwinger are stricken by a Jesuit censor.

Artis Historicae Penus (Treasury of the Art of History, 1579) is a compilation of 18 ars historica works issued in Basel by the humanist printer Pietro Perna, This later edition appeared in 2 volumes with a copious index. A third volume adds the final work by Antonio Riccoboni. Beforehand, in 1576, Perna brought out a single volume that ran to 1140 pages and featured the Methodus ad facilem historiarum cognitionem (1566) of Jean Bodin in its title, followed by twelve other treatises. Perna writes a letter to the lover of histories (Historiarum amatori Typographus). The 1576 letter of Protestant editor Johann Wolff dedicates the later collection to Frederick I, Duke of Wurttemberg. He states that he has included all the princely dedications and prefaces of the single works from the source editions for the sake of completeness.

In addition to the two standard Greek texts of the genre by Dionysius of Halicarnassus and Lucian of Samosata translated into Latin, the authors, editors and translators included are an international list of the most notable humanist writers on the literature of history. There are several Catholics, but those closest to the Perna press were Protestants. Among them are six Italians, four Germans, three Frenchmen, a Spaniard and a Hungarian. As humanist members of the Renaissance Res Publica Litterarum all wrote in Latin, though Stupano latinized Patrizi's Dieci Dialoghi for Perna. The dates of the editions used by Perna follow the authors' names.

- I. Jean Bodin 1572,
- II. Francesco Patrizi (trans. Johann Nikolaus Stupano) 1570,
- III. Giovanni Pontano 1556,
- IV. Francois Baudouin 1561,
- V. Sebastian Fox Morcillo 1557,
- VI. Giovanni Antonio Viperani 1567,
- VII. Francis Robortello 1560,
- VIII. Dionysius of Halicarnassus (trans. Andreas Dudith) 1560,
- IX. Christopher Milieu 1551,
- X. Uberto Foglietta 1574,
- XI. David Chytraeus 1569,
- XII. Lucian of Samosata (trans. Jacob Micyllus) 1538,
- XIII. Simon Grynaeus 1539,
- XIV. Celio Secondo Curione 1554,
- XV. Christoph Pezel 1568,
- XVI. Theodor Zwinger 1571,
- XVII. Johannes Sambucus 1568,
- XVIII. Antonio Riccoboni 1568.

The ars historica and its classical exempla were important pedagogical tools for the education of princes, treasured for the lessons in statecraft found in histories. They also served as an antidote to the influence of Niccolò Machiavelli. The Counter Reformation polyhistor Antonio Possevino fathered a Jesuit ars historica to replace the influence of Bodin and the heterodox authors of the Perna collection in his Bibliotheca selecta 1593 and expanded it to an Apparatus ad omnium gentium historiam 1597.
