= Curione =

Curione is a surname. Notable people with the surname include:

- Celio Secondo Curione (1503–1569), Italian humanist, grammarian, editor and historian
- Celio Augustino Curione (1538–1567), Italian scholar
- Laura Curione (born 1988), Italian bobsledder

== See also ==
- Curioni
