= Apparatus ad omnium gentium historiam =

1597 bibliographical guide by Antonio Possevino

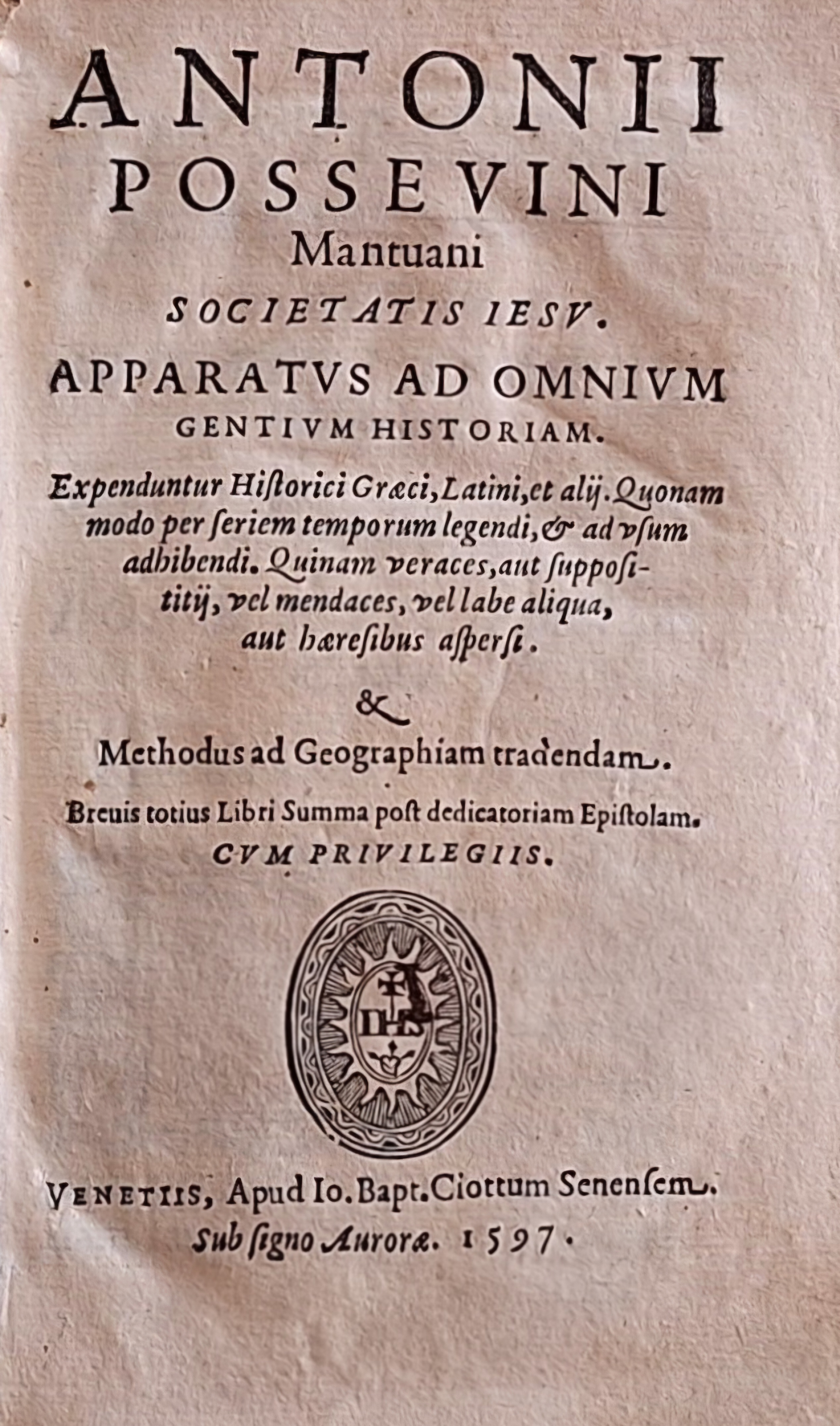
- Author: Antonio Possevino
- Language: Latin
- Subject: Ars historica
- Genre: Treatise
- Publisher: Giovanni Battista Ciotti
- Publication date: 1597
- Publication place: Italy
- Preceded by: Bibliotheca selecta

Apparatus ad omnium gentium historiam (English: Apparatus to the history of all peoples) is a bibliographical guide first published in 1597 and written by Antonio Possevino.

== Description ==
Possevino was a major figure in the diplomatic and intellectual life of the Counter Reformation. His earlier work Bibliotheca selecta (1593) announced a programmatic role for history as a guiding principle in his organization of his Jesuit encyclopedia in Historia, in Disciplinis.

Possevino's De Humana Historia, Book 16, is a first elaboration of his re-edition of the culture of the ars historica as part of a papally sanctioned programme of Catholic learning. In 1597 Possevino expanded this material into a book with the printer G.B.Ciotti of Venice, intending to split his ambitious work into seven parts. This work is intensely critical of other historical scholars of his time, and maintains a position that only works that support the Ecclesiastical continuity line are of use for historic research and study.

Possevino's title is in direct contest with the Methodus ad facilem historiarum cognitionem 1566 of Jean Bodin. His source for this work was the Artis Historicae Penus of the Basel printer Pietro Perna. Obscuring the uses he was to make of this heterodox source, the Jesuit issued a censure of the work in his Iudicium of 1592 and had it placed on the Index librorum prohibitorum.

Ciotti also printed the work translated in Italian by Possevino in 1598, Apparato all'historia di tutte le nationi et il modo di studiare la geografia. The Italian translation follows the structure of the 1597, although minor changes can be noted. In 1602 there was a further edition, De Apparatu ad omnium gentium historiam published in Venice which served as the text for an updated edition of the Bibliotheca selecta (Venice, 1603).

With this work Possevino refashioned the ars historica culture and literature of the Late Renaissance as a cornerstone of the Jesuit classicism of the Baroque. His work laid the foundation for a tradition of historical and bibliographical scholarship exemplified in the Bollandist scholars, Nathaniel Bacon's Bibliotheca scriptorum Societatis Iesu, the histories of Daniello Bartoli and other landmarks of Jesuit historiography, such as the Monumenta Historica Societatis Iesu.
