= Girolamo Maggi =

Italian scholar, jurist, and poet

Girolamo Maggi (c.1523, in Anghiari – 27 March 1572 in Constantinople), also known by his Latin name Hieronymus Magius, was an Italian scholar, jurist, poet, military engineer, urban planner, philologist, archaeologist, mathematician, and naturalist who studied at Bologna under Francis Robortello. He authored several works, including a collection of poems on the Flemish wars, (Cinque primi canti della guerra di Fiandra, 1551), one detailing military fortifications (Della fortificatione delle città, by his friend Giacomo Fusto Castriotto, but edited, annotated, and published posthumously by Maggi in 1564), and several on the subject of philosophy.

== Early life and education ==
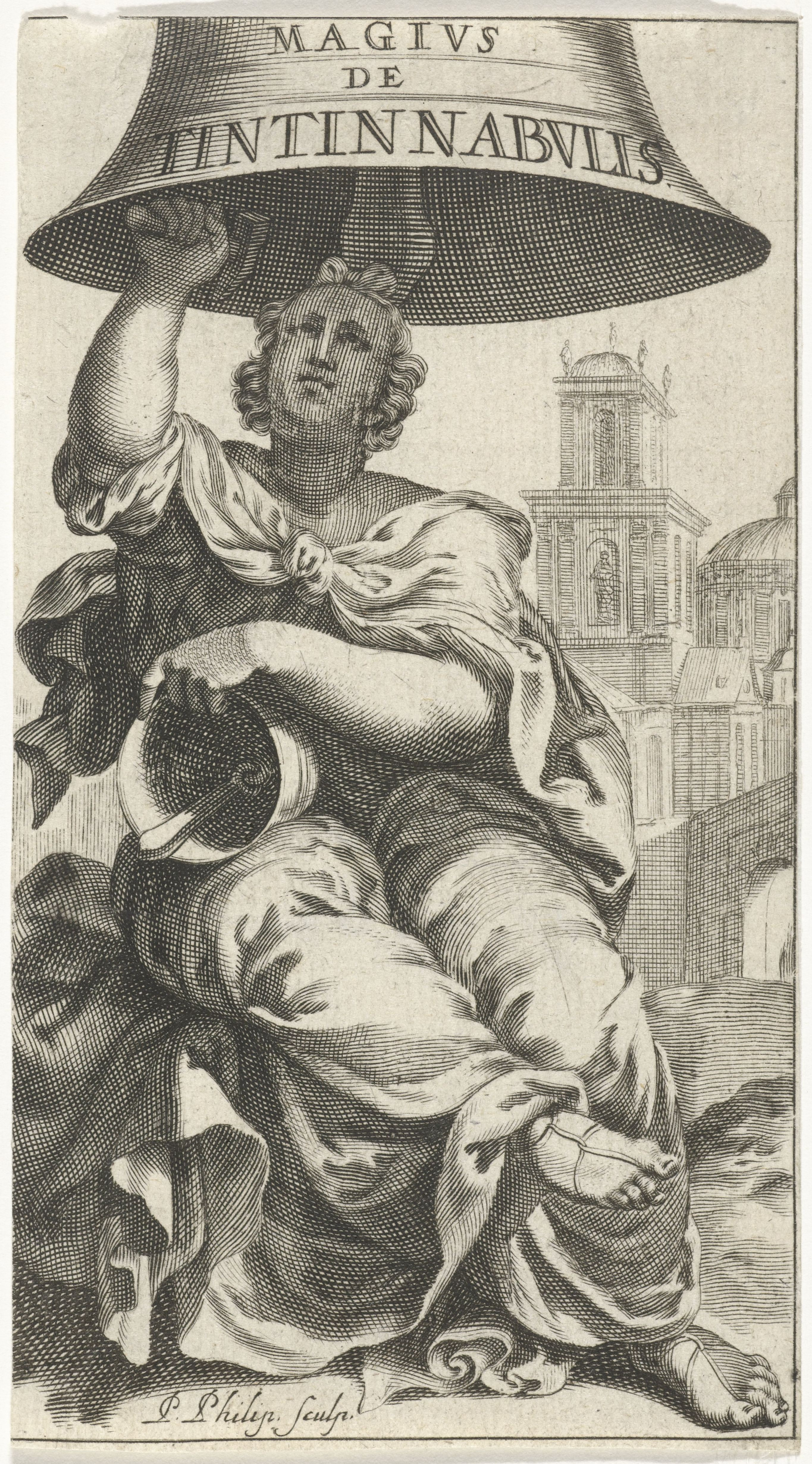
Girolamo Maggi, De tintinnabulis liber postumus. Amsterdam: Henricus Wetstein, 1664.

Maggi was born in Anghiari, Tuscany. Little is known about his youth. His year of birth is unknown; several authors have speculated, based on varying access to information. Maggi specifically mentioned how, in infancy, he was attacked by the same pestilence which, in 1563, he states was the most recent one to occur. This was most likely the black death of 1527 spread by Charles V's Protestant mercenaries (Landsknechts) when they defeated the French and pillaged the Vatican, but may have been one of the following year or of three years later. His parents were Paolo and Luisa, who quickly left him an orphan.

As a young man, Maggi studied oratory with Pierantonio Ghezzi from Laterina, a master of Latin. Afterwards, to proceed with the then popular studies, he went at first to the nearby University of Perugia, then to that of Pisa, and finally to that of Bologna. In Pisa, he attended the lectures of the famous professor of Latin and Greek oratory, Francis Robortello, who was a faculty member from 1543 to 1549.

== Professional life ==
Maggi, who beyond his native Tuscan, had mastered Latin and was erudite in Greek, Hebrew, and Spanish. Availing himself of such endowments, he went into jurisprudence, more to examine its spirit than its profession. Initially, he studied the method of Andrea Alciato, then that of Bartolo da Sassoferrato and the 14th and 15th-century schools of thought.

He became interested in ancient history, and quickly began studying epigraphy and architectonics. As part of this interest, Maggi accumulated a large collection of ancient tombstones, including ones from Como, Ravenna, Rieti, Foligno, Perugia and Rome. In Pisa, where he was still engaged in formal studies, and in other Italian cities, he visited and examined sepulchres and sarcophagi, and used his growing knowledge to dispute a universally accepted belief of the time: the idea of the existence of giants in ancient days. All of this work formed the basis for his tractatus on sepulchres. He worked diligently to provide correct interpretations of ancient works of Roman law and, for his successful explanation of a section of the Pandects of Justinian, as he himself tells the story, he was embraced and kissed by Robertello. In Pisa, he probably obtained his doctoral degree in 1546 and returned to his native land two years later.

In 1548, he was requested by his fellow citizens to visit Cosimo I de' Medici, Grand Duke of Tuscany. He began this endeavour in Venice, the city where in those times, the greatest Italian minds lived quietly and profited greatly from their studies, due to the vast commerce of books fueled by the carefulness and tolerance of the government; there he again saw Robortello, and started a friendship with the famous writer Pietro Aretino. Maggi, who had nothing to offer, may have sought protection from Aretino, or hoped to avoid harsh criticism from him, when he sang the following hendecasyllabic verses, published in his 1551 Guerro di Fiandro (Canto II, verse 56):

L'uom tre volte chiarissimo e divino Il famoso immortal Pietro Aretino.	The man three times celebrated and divine The famous immortal Pietro Aretino.

Pleased by the words, Aretino sent this poem on the Flemish wars to Chiapino Vitelli, the famous Spanish mercenary general, in February 1551, along with a letter praising Maggi's talents. Vitelli's family owned much land around Anghiari, in an area only a few miles from the Maggi estate. So, Maggi endeavoured to please Vitelli, a soldier of Cosimo, to obtain good entrance at the royal court in Florence. He also praised Giovanni dalle Bande Nere, father of Cosimo I, whose daring son's rise to the throne of Florence well represented Maggi's goal. In five canti, Maggi often complained about his sad fate, showing himself unhappy with the legal profession exercised by him out of necessity.

Se il giovin quale Ulpian, Bartolo e Baldo Disturban spesso e l'aspra inopia e dura Non viene afforza al poetar men saldo, E a l'avvocar rivolti ogni sua cura; Io per certo infiammato esser e caldo A fare il veggio un'immortal scrittura, Gli dia la vita il Ciel, sostegno e 'l nido, E 'l gran Cosmo udirà, d'altr'opra il grido.	Although this young man by Ulpian, Bartolo and Baldo Is often distracted, and severe hardship Does not assist him with writing verse, And he turns his attention to legal practice; Nonetheless I firmly believe that for his fiery temper I will see him write immortal verse, Aided by the might, support and protection of the Heavens And the noble Cosimo will behold that great work.

== Ottoman invasion ==
He was a judge and military defence engineer in Famagusta on Cyprus when the island was invaded by Ottoman Turks in 1571. Besieged by the Turks, he invented machines to defend Famagusta against their attacks. When the island was conquered, Maggi was sent to the dungeons at Constantinople where locked in chains, he wrote from memory two detailed treatises, De tintinnabulis, on bells and carillons, and the explicitly illustrated De equuleo, on torture devices.

In attempts to be freed, he dedicated the first treatise to Carolus Rym (Charles Ramire), ambassador to the Holy Roman Emperor Maximilian II, and the second treatise to François de Noailles, bishop of Aire and ambassador to the King of France. They were pleased with his works and endeavoured to obtain his release. Their efforts, however, were brought to light as he was being released to the Italian ambassador. The prison captain ordered him to be detained and executed by strangulation.

His two treatises were published posthumously in 1608 and 1609, respectively.

== Works ==
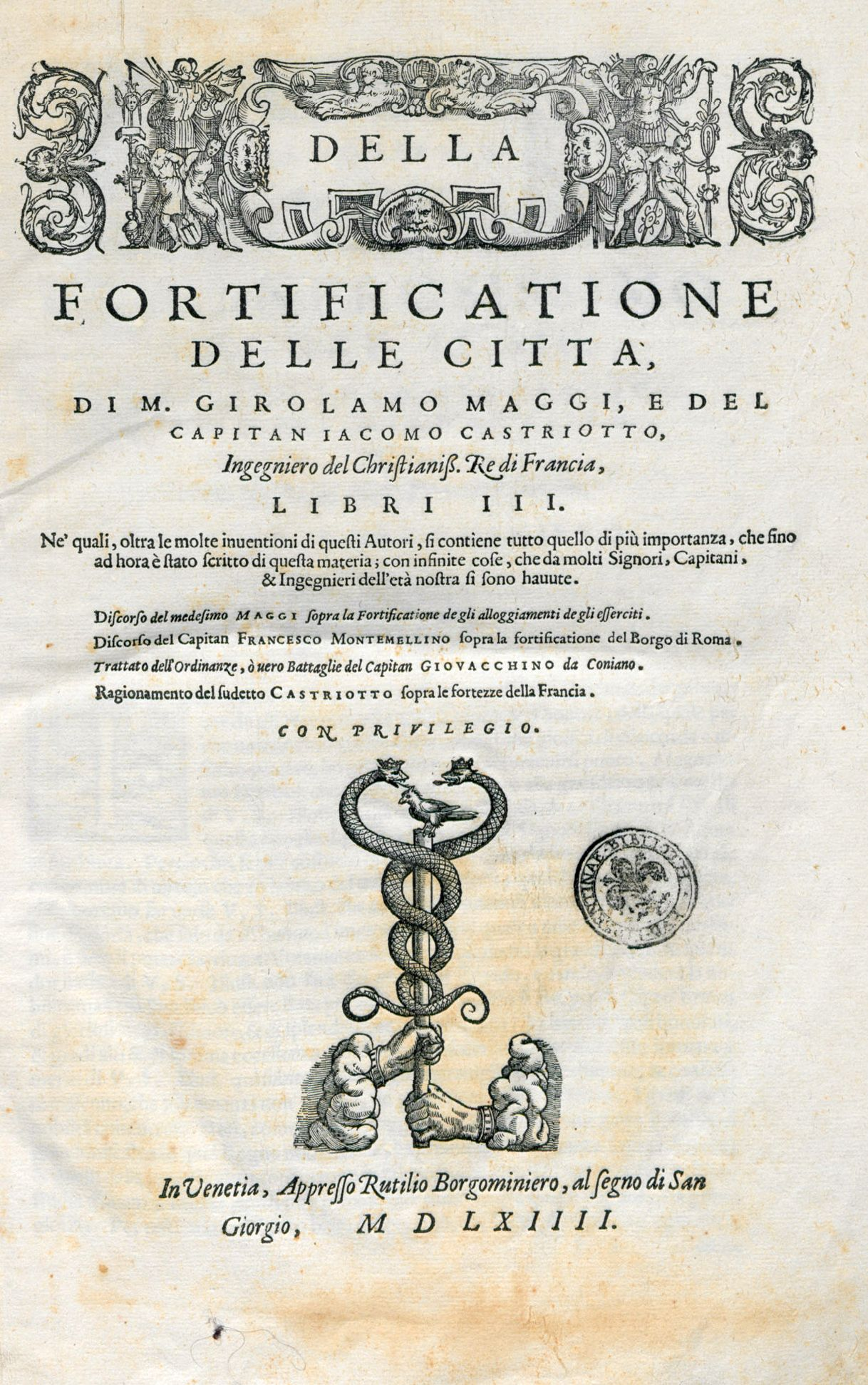
Della fortificatione delle città, 1564

- Cinque primi canti della guerra di Fiandra. 1551.
- De mundi exustione, et de die judicii [On the World's Consumption by Fire and the Day of Judgment]. 1562.
- Miscellanorum, seu Variarum Lectionum. 1564.
- Della fortificatione delle città. with Giacomo Fusto Castriotto. 1564.
- Della fortificatione delle città (in Italian). Venezia: Rutilio Borgominieri. 1564.
- De tintinnabulis. 1664.
- De equuleo. 1689.
