= Stephen Báthory at Pskov =

Painting by Jan Matejko

Batory at Pskov
- Stefan Batory pod Pskowem (Polish)
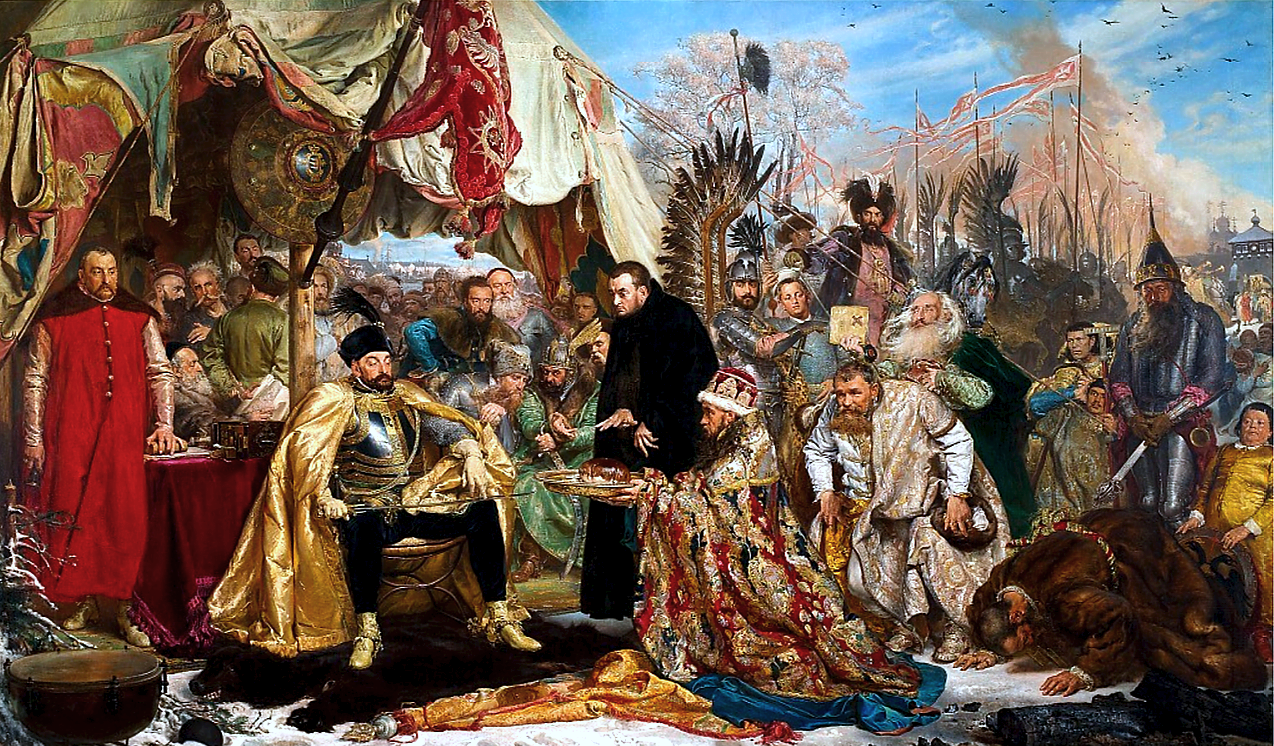
- Artist: Jan Matejko
- Year: 1872
- Medium: Oil on canvas
- Dimensions: 322 cm × 545 cm (127 in × 215 in)
- Location: Royal Castle, Warsaw
- Website: Batory at Pskov

Stephen Báthory at Pskov or Báthory at Pskov (Polish - Stefan Batory pod Pskowem) is an allegorical historical painting from 1872 by the Polish artist Jan Matejko, now in the collections of the Royal Castle in Warsaw, Poland. It portrays a fictional event of people of the Russian tsar Ivan the Terrible kneeling before the Polish king Stephen Báthory at Pskov during the final period of peace negotiations at the end of the 1578-1582 Livonian campaign. It also shows the papal legate, the black-robed Jesuit Antonio Possevino.

Matejko exhibited it in Prague and for it was made an academician of the Academy of Fine Arts in Prague and an honorary foreign member of the French Académie des Beaux-Arts, as well as winning a Medal of Arts from the Academy of Fine Arts in Vienna. It and Rejtan were seized by the Germans during World War II and hurriedly evacuated in 1944, leaving them both badly damaged. They were both rediscovered in the village of Przesieka near Jelenia Góra by Professor Stanislaw Lorentz. Their restoration took three years.

The literal interpretation of the painting is historically inaccurate since it depicts the events metaphorically, as part of a broader narrative depicting the significance of the event outside of its immediate context.

== Accuracy of depicted events ==
It is obvious that Matejko pursued different goals than maximum historical accuracy. The painting depicts the events from October to December 1581. The description of these events is detailed in the sources: participants of the second campaign of Stephen Báthory against Russia in 1580 wrote diaries. These are Jan Zborowski, castellan, who commanded an elite part of Stephen Báthory's army, and Luka Dzilinski, the head of Stephen Báthory's vanguard troops. There is also a preserved Russian work, "The Tale of Stephen Báthory's Arrival at the City of Pskov." In addition, there is a preserved diary of the siege of Pskov, which was written by the secretary of the royal chancellery, Jan Piotrowski.

In reality, peace negotiations did not take place under the walls of Pskov, and Báthory did not conduct these negotiations personally. Matejko gathered together scattered facts and placed them in one painting.

Grigory Afanasyevich Naschokin had performed diplomatic assignments more than once, but he met Stephen Báthory in Lithuania a year before the siege - in 1580. Kiprian, Archbishop of Polotsk and Velikolutsky, showed himself during the siege of Polotsk in 1579. When the voivodes sent negotiators to the enemy about the surrender of the city, Kiprian did not agree with this decision. He, along with other voivodes, intended to blow up the fortress, but when this failed, they locked themselves in the Church of St. Sophia upon the enemy's entry into the city and declared that they could only be taken by force. On August 11, 1579, Archbishop Kiprian was taken prisoner. His further fate is unknown.

Half a year before the events depicted in the painting, Ivan IV reproached Stephen Báthory for his arrogance in dealing with his envoys. Ivan blamed Báthory for treating his envoys like "some unknown orphans":

And you have sent a letter to us with your messenger with Ventslav Lopatinsky, and in that your letter it is written that our envoys "before your Majesty are called," as if some unknown orphans, not envoys, and having brought them like orphans, they were placed at the doorstep and from there, as if to heaven, like God, to converse, such was the "placement of our envoys before your Majesty" and the exaltation of your pride!

— "Letter to Polish King Stephen Báthory", Ivan the Terrible, June 29, 1581

All representatives of the Polish-Lithuanian Commonwealth were dressed quite lightly, without headgear, although the army of Stephen Báthory suffered greatly from the unusual cold:

Oh God! What a terrible cold! Some cruel frost with wind. I have never experienced such a thing in Poland.

— Diary of Piotrovsky, October 28, 1581

Jesuit Antonio Possevino really played an important role in these historical events - he arrived in the besieged Pskov, Báthory left the besieged city with part of the army, and the mediation of Possevino really led to the conclusion of the Yam-Zapolsky peace. Possevino's mission was caused by a diplomatic move by Ivan the Terrible, who intended to use the Pope as a mediator in an international dispute:

"But the archpriest Antony, accepting their deceit like cunning foxes, proclaims himself to the envoys of the sovereign, and makes an attempt to reconcile the desires of both countries, and himself sent by the Roman Pope to reconcile with the sovereign and the king. The king leaves this advice and himself departs from Pskov to his Lithuanian land."

— "The Tale of Stefan Báthory's Arrival in Pskov"

Possevino hoped that his activities would persuade Ivan the Terrible to agree to the Union, but this attempt ended in failure. The image of Possevino in the painting as a peace-loving mediator does not correspond to historical truth: Possevino conducted negotiations aggressively and in the interests of Báthory:

When the Moscow envoys wanted to write that the Tsar was ceding Courland and Livonia to the King, Possevino again began to shout: "You came to steal, not to negotiate!" He snatched the document out of Alferiev's hands, threw it at the door, grabbed Prince Eletsky by the collar and fur coat, turned him over, tore off his buttons and shouted: "Get out of my room, I won't talk to you!"

Although there are other assessments of Possevino's activities, since Istoma Shevrygin was specifically sent by Ivan the Terrible to the Vatican to ask the Pope to "restrain the evil Báthory". And some historians believe that Possevino openly sided with the Russian delegation. His intervention in the negotiations was perceived with gritted teeth by Polish officials. The legate was accused of espionage in favor of the Russians. The image of Possevino in Polish historiography is negative.

The negotiations on the Russian side were actually led by Prince Dmitry Petrovich Eletsky and the wise nobleman and printer Roman Vasilyevich Alferiev-Beznin (apparently, the Poles called him "Basenia").

December 8, 9, 10, 11, and 12. Nothing special happened during these days; we received word that the Russian envoys were nearby and today or tomorrow will come to Yama to start negotiations. Lord, bless us! Those who saw them on their way say that they bring good news, and all three of them are accompanied by a hundred and eighty guards. The first one is Prince Dmitry Eletsky, probably a nobleman; the second one is Basenia, a nobleman, and the third one is a deacon. When our cavalry, led by Zebryzhidovsky, which went to accompany the envoys, passed by Porhov, thirty riders of Pan Kazanovsky approached the castle closely, and that's when a clash occurred with 80 Russian riders and 200 foot soldiers.

— Dnevnik Batoryya na Rossiyu ("Batory's Diary of the Russian Campaign")

So on December 13, 1581, the Polish-Lithuanian and Russian envoys met in the village of Zapolye Yama. On the Polish side, negotiations were led by the voivode of Bratslav, Janusz Zbaraski, the voivode of Vilnius and the Lithuanian hetman, Krzysztof Radziwill "Perun," and the secretary, Lithuanian diplomat Mikhail Garaburda. Possevino was present as a mediator.

When the envoys arrived in Zapolye Yama, they saw that the village was mostly burned down. In fact, the negotiations took place in the village of Kiverova Gora, 15 miles from Zapolye Yama. The negotiations were turbulent, and the change of location was not mentioned in the documents. The 1582 treaty was named after the burned-down village, and it was renamed from Yama Zapolye to Yama Zapolsky by the historian Solovyov.

According to the treaty, Russia relinquished all of its possessions in the Baltics and the possessions of its vassals and allies in favor of the Commonwealth: Kurlyandia, ceding it to Poland; 40 cities in Livonia, which passed to Poland; the city of Polotsk with its county (district); and the city of Velizh with its surroundings. The Commonwealth returned to the tsar the native Novgorod and Tver lands seized during the last three-year war: the "suburbs" of Pskov (that is, the cities of the Pskov land - Opochka, Porhov, and others, which were in the zone of military operations), Velikie Luki, Nevel, Kholm, Sebezh.

In the Russian version of the treaty, the title "tsar" was preserved after the name of the ruler, while in the Polish version the title "tsar" was not mentioned. In the Russian version, the tsar was also referred to as the "ruler of Livonia and Smolensk", while in the Polish version the Polish king was referred to as the "ruler of Livonia", and the title "Smolensk" belonged to no one. Historian N.M. Karamzin, evaluating the Treaty of Yam, called it "the most disadvantageous and dishonorable peace for Russia of all the ones concluded with Lithuania up to that time."
