= Pietro Perna =

Italian printer

Perna printer's device & motto: Verbum tuum lucerna pedibus meis Ps.119:105. "Thy word is a lamp unto my feet" 1558

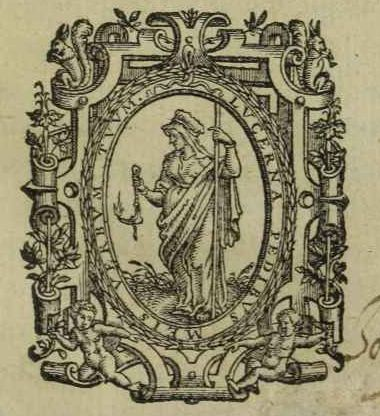
Perna's printer device

Pietro Perna (1519 – 16 August 1582) was an Italian printer, the leading printer of Late Renaissance Basel, the Erasmian crossroads between Italian Renaissance humanism and the Protestant Reformation. His books promoted the Italian heretical thinkers at the origins of Socinianism and the theory of Tolerance. He was a major publisher of Protestant historians like Flacius Illyricus and David Chytraeus and promoted the ars historica treatises of the period, notably the 18 authores de historia in Artis Historicae Penus (1579).

A native of Villa Basilica, in the Republic of Lucca, and a Dominican, he arrived in Basel in 1544 as a disciple of the reformer Pietro Martire Vermigli and with the help of Pietro Carnesecchi. As a printer he started as an assistant to the renowned Johannes Oporinus and set up a press of his own in 1558. As a bookseller and apprentice printer he established a network of Italian connections that helped him act as a go between and publisher of Italian reformed thinkers and writers, such as Vermigli, Pier Paolo Vergerio, Jacopo Aconcio, Bernardino Ochino, Lelio Sozzini, Sebastian Castellio, Celio Secondo Curione, etc. He published the first edition (editio princeps) of the original Greek text of the Enneads of Plotinus. He produced important editions of Machiavelli and Bodin, Guicciardini and Lodovico Castelvetro. He published works of Paracelsus and various Paracelsians but also served as the chief printer of Paracelsus's leading critic Thomas Erastus. In 1570 Perna sent the artist Tobias Stimmer to Como to copy the famous collection of historical portraits in the Giovio Collection. Stimmer's distinctive woodcuts decorate numerous editions of Paolo Giovio, brought out by Perna and Heinrich Petri. The Basel doctor and polymath Theodor Zwinger was his close collaborator. Perna died of the plague and was buried in St. Peter's Church.

Ad Perneam Lecytum (At Perna's oil lamp) 1580

== Bibliography ==
- Peter G. Bietenholz, (1959) Der italienische Humanismus und die Blutezeit des Buchdrucks in Basel. Die Basler Drucke italianischer Autoren von 1530 bis zum Ende des 16. Jahrhunderts, Basel-Stuttgart, Helbig & Lichtenhahn.
- Antonio Rotondò, (1974) Pietro Perna e la vita culturale e religiosa di Basilea fra il 1570 e il 1580, in Studi e ricerche di storia ereticale italiana del Cinquecento, Turin, Giappichelli.
- Perini, Leandro, (2002) La vita e i tempi di Pietro Perna, Rome, Edizioni di storia, provides a numbered catalogue of the 430 editions printed by Perna between 1549 and 1582.
- Oxford Companion to the Book (2010), sub voce.
