= Lancelot Browne =

English physician

Lancelot Browne (c. 1545 – 1605) was an English physician.

== Life ==
He was a native of York. He matriculated at St. John's College, Cambridge, in May 1559, where he was a few months behind William Gilbert, with whom he associated in later life. He graduated B.A. in 1562–3, and M.A. in 1566. In 1567 he was elected fellow of Pembroke Hall; in 1570 received the license of the university to practise physic. He took a leading part in the opposition to the new statutes of the university promulgated in 1572, and in 1573 was made proctor.

He was created M.D. in 1576, and after this would appear to have moved to London, as on 10 June 1584 he was elected fellow of the College of Physicians. He was censor in 1587, and several times afterwards; an elect in 1599; and a member of the council of the college in 1604–5; but died in 1605, probably shortly before 11 December.

Browne was physician to Queen Elizabeth, to James I, and to his queen Anne of Denmark. In the 1570s the privy council consulted him and Roger Marbeck, another royal physician, concerning diseases encountered in the English naval campaign against the Spanish. Just before the Spanish Armada, Browne, Gilbert, Marbeck and Ralph Wilkinson were put on alert to help the navy with drugs.

He was one of those entrusted by the College of Physicians in 1589 with the preparation of a pharmacopoeia, and in 1594 was on a committee appointed for the same object. The work was stalled, and was not resumed until after his death. He had learned some Arabic, and William Bedwell relates that, when ambassadors came in 1600 from the Sultan of Morocco, Browne was the only person who could understand them.

== Works ==
He contributed a commendatory letter in Latin prefixed to John Gerard's Great Herbal (first edition, 1597). A dictionary he compiled to the works of Avicenna was unpublished, but was used much later by Edmund Castell for his Lexicon Heptaglotton, and Browne is mentioned in the introduction. He collaborated with Thomas Blundeville, on The Theoriques of the Seuen Planets (1602), an astronomy book that also published research of William Gilbert on magnetism, and contained work by Henry Briggs and Edward Wright.

== Family ==
He was father-in-law to William Harvey, who married his daughter Elizabeth, and father of Galen Browne, also a physician.
