= Curioni =

Curioni is an Italian surname. Notable people with the surname include:

- Hugo Curioni (born 1946), Argentine retired footballer
- Marcello Curioni (born 1965), Italian retired marathon runner

== See also ==
- Curione
