= Celio Secondo Curione =

Italian humanist (1503–1569)

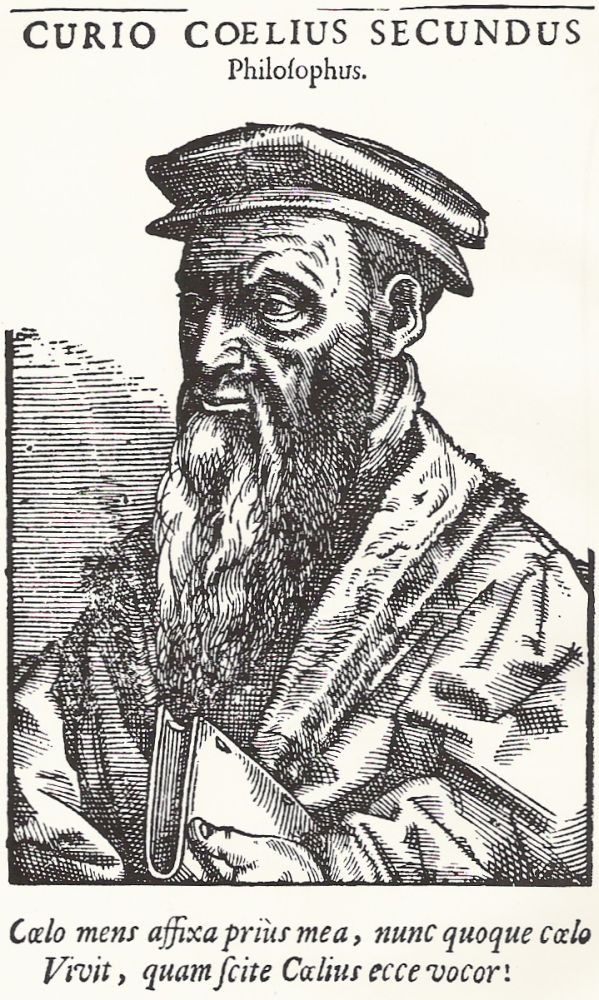
- Born: 1 May 1503
- Died: 24 November 1569 (aged 66)

Celio Secondo Curione (1 May 1503, in Cirié – 24 November 1569, in Basel) (usual Latin form Caelius Secundus Curio) was an Italian humanist, grammarian, editor and historian, who exercised a considerable influence upon the Italian Reformation. A teacher in Humanities, university professor and preceptor to the nobility, he had a lively and colourful career, moving frequently between states to avoid denunciation and imprisonment: he was successively at Turin, Milan, Pavia, Venice and Lucca, before becoming a religious exile in Switzerland, first at Lausanne and finally at Basel, where he settled. He was famous and admired as a publisher and editor of works of theology and history, also for his own writings and teachings, and for the wide sphere of his friendships and correspondence with many of the most interesting reformists, Protestants and heretics of his time, though his energetic influence was at times disruptive. The imputation of antitrinitarianism is very doubtful. Curio published under the Latin form of his name, but scholarship has adopted the Italian form.

== Rebellious youth ==
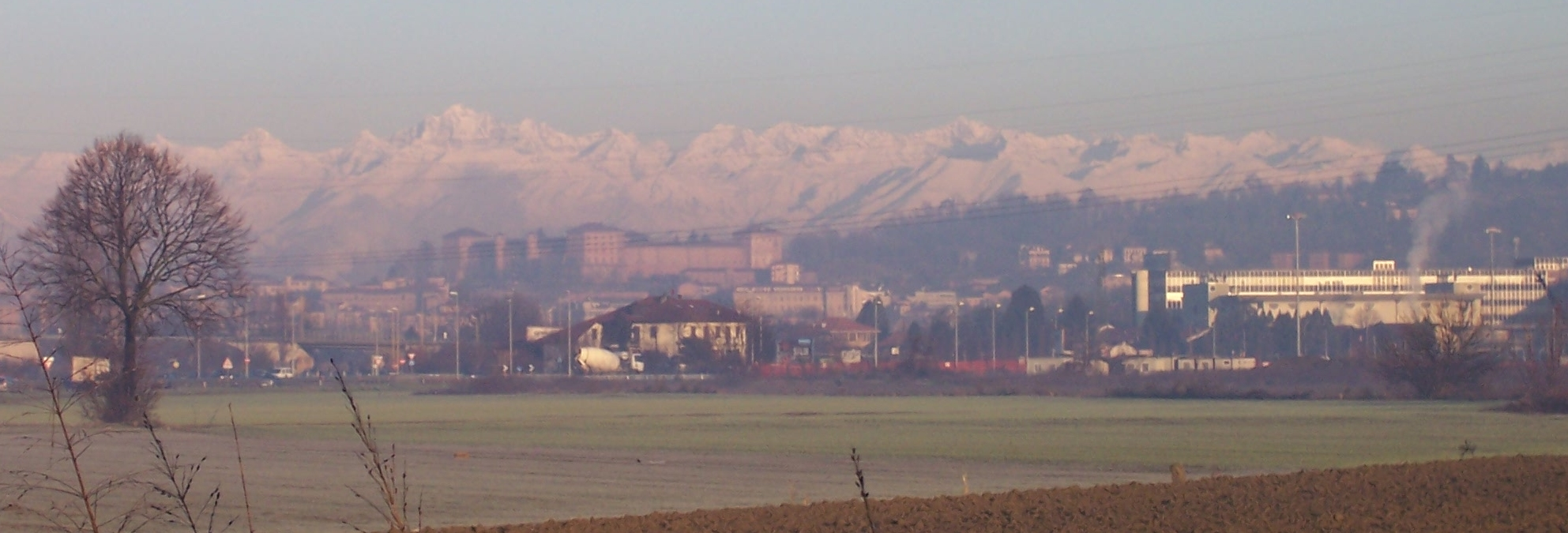
Moncalieri

Celio Secondo was born on 1 May 1503 at Cirié, in Piedmont, not far from Turin, to Jacomino Troterio Curione and Charlotte de Montrotier (a lady in the court of Bianca of Savoy) who died giving birth to him. The twenty-third of the sons of Jacomino, who married into the feudal family of the Counts di Provana, his surname may derive from the Castello di Cuori, near Ciriè. He was brought up by his maternal aunt Maddalena at Moncalieri (in the Po valley under the Western Alps), a little town under the authority of Turin, where his father received public appointments and where his mother's family dwelt. His father died when he was nine, leaving him among other things a precious illuminated Bible.

Around 1520 he began his studies at the University of Turin, where his masters were Giorgio Corona, Domenico Machaneo (commentator upon Suetonius) and Giovanni Bremio for Humanistic studies, and Francesco Sfondrati, future Cardinal, for Law. Some of the Turin Augustinians introduced him to some of the writings of Luther, the De Captivitate Babylonica Ecclesiae and Resolutiones Disputationum de Indulgentiarum Virtute, and other works of the reformers north of the Alps, the De Falsa et Vera Religione of Zwingli and the Loci Communes of Melancthon. Curio and his friends Jacopo Cornello and Francesco Guarino (who became pastors at Geneva) were much enthused.

Curio planned a journey into Germany, but instead found himself imprisoned for two months in the fortress of Caprano by order of the Bishop of Ivrea, Cardinal Bonifacio Ferrero. He was then sent to the Benedictine abbey of Fruttuaria at San Benigno Canavese, to be "purged" of heretical ideas through penitence and the study of orthodox texts. This was unsuccessful: Curio violated the reliquary of SS Agapeto and Tiburtius, substituting a Bible for the bones, with a message in Latin: "This is the Ark of the Covenant, from which true Gospels can be brought forth and in which are found the true relics of the Saints."

The early chronology is unclear: his biographer states that, having fled to Milan, he distinguished himself by helping the citizens during an epidemic of the plague. There was one such at Milan in 1524, and another in 1528 in the province of Bergamo. To this period belong a journey to Padua and his enrolment in study, another journey to Rome and a later return to Milan, with (around 1530) his marriage to Margherita Bianca Isacchi (1509–1587) at Barzago (Brianza).

== A teacher in Italy ==
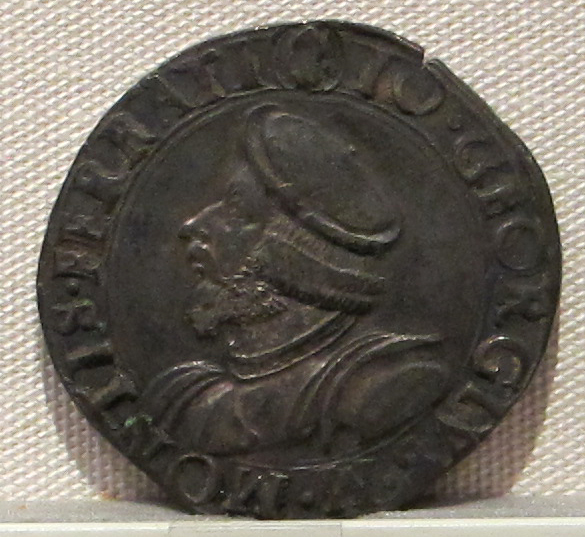
Giangiorgio Paleologo, Marchese del Monferrato

At Milan he lived by teaching humanities, while continuing to study law with Sfondrati. To avoid the constant warfare in the Duchy he accepted an invitation from Gian Giorgio, Marchese of Montferrat. He remained at the court of Casale Monferrato for a while after the Marchese's death on 3 April 1533: his first daughter, future wife of Girolamo Zanchi, was born at Ceva on 8 November, and his second son Orazio at Casale in 1534. Here he became acquainted with Fulvio Pellegrino Morato, professor at Vicenza, who was visiting Piedmont: they agreed in religious matters so much that Morato later said that Curio had been for him what Ananias had been for St Paul.

His brethren having died of the plague Curio should have returned to Moncalieri to settle his inheritance with his only surviving sister, but, faced with being denounced for heresy, he renounced his rights. Having failed to respond to a summons to Casale from Federico Gonzaga, successor to the Marquessate, he took work as a teacher at Castiglione Torinese, where in a disputation with a Dominican preacher in 1535 he argued in defence of Luther. Denounced to the Suffragan of Turin he was imprisoned, but managed to escape by tricking the gaoler into shackling a false leg to the cell wall and escaping through the unbarred window. As the mystery of his escape gave rise to superstitious rumours, he later explained how it was managed in a Dialogue, Probus. He took refuge at Salò, where he was reunited with his family: two of his sons were born there, Leo in 1536 and Agostino in 1538.

=== Pavia, Venezia and Ferrara ===
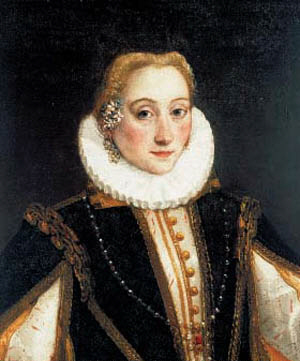
Olympia Fulvia Morata

In 1536 he obtained a chair in humanistic letters for three years at the University of Pavia: Andrea Alciati was his colleague there, and he wrote his first Orations and the first draft of the three books of Schola, sive De Perfecto Grammatico (not published until 1555). He described the perfect Grammaticus as an orator who takes the classical foundations of Cicero and Quintilian to inform a contemporary embodiment of the humanist professor, one who dignifies his profession through full responsibility towards his role as educator and cultural guide. His renown as professor was tied to his anti-Catholic stances: as a result Pope Paul III demanded his removal from the university. His admiring students accompanied him to his alternative lodgings in the city to defend him from possible attack. The Senate of Pavia, fearing a threat of excommunication from the Church, succumbed and in 1539 licensed Curio to leave the Duchy.

He next went to Venice, where he attended the French Ambassador to the republic, the Bishop of Montpellier. To him he dedicated the Aranei Encomion, a short tract treating the fable of Arachne as an allegory of the Church and Holy Wisdom, published in Venice in 1540. In Lent he is likely to have heard the preaching of Bernardino Ochino. He became the companion of the Augustinian mendicant Giulio da Milano, a secret Protestant convert. Giulio, who had preached justification by faith alone, was arrested in 1541, and Curio, identified as his close associate, departed abruptly for Ferrara. There his friend Pellegrino Morato, preceptor in the court of Este, recommended him to Duchess Renata, wife of Ercole II d'Este. He remained briefly, forming a friendship with Morato's young daughter Olympia Fulvia Morata, with whom he maintained a lifelong correspondence.

=== Lucca ===
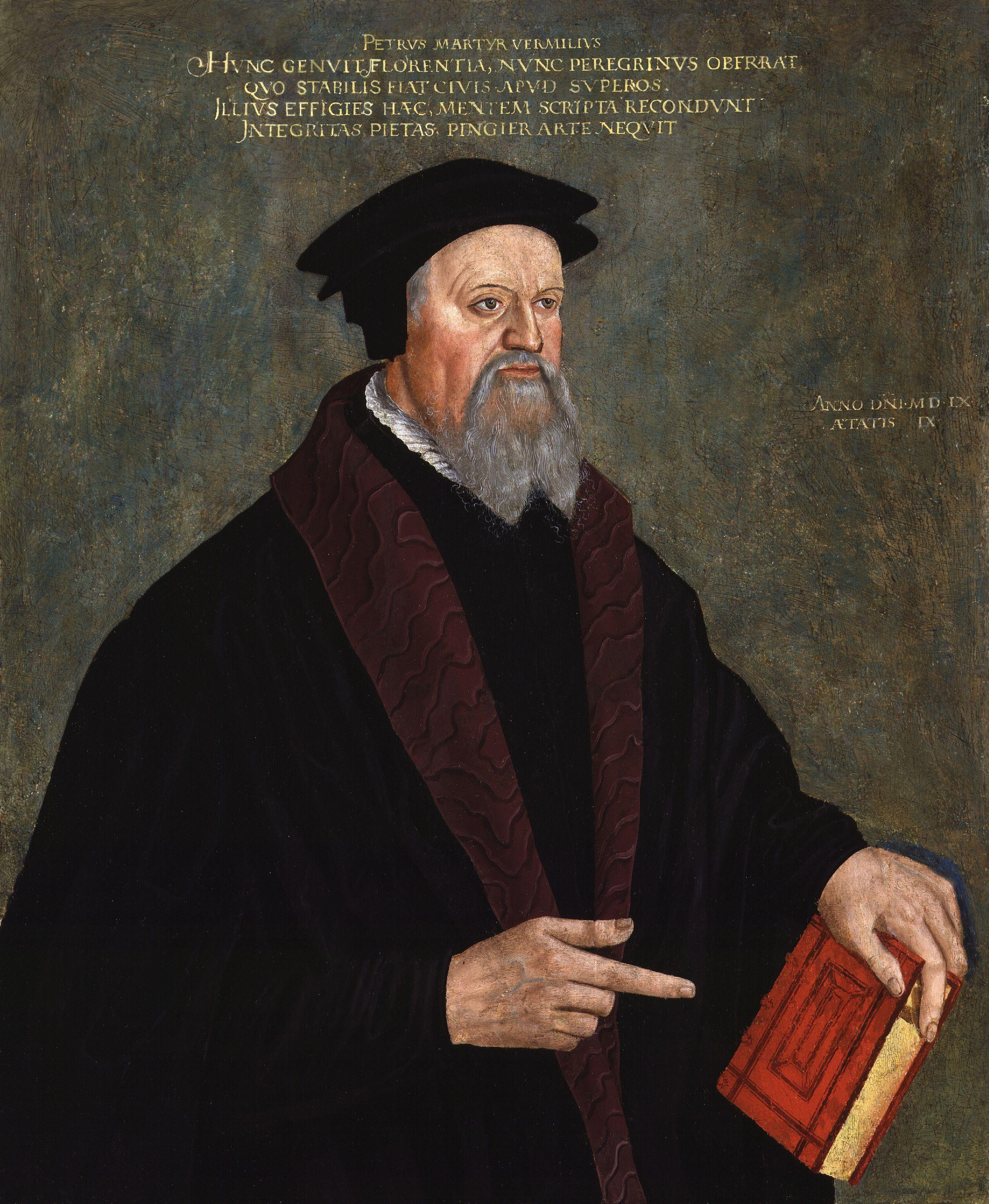
Pietro Martire Vermigli

By October he was already in Lucca, employed as preceptor by the nobleman Niccolò di Silvestro Arnolfini. The Republic of Lucca was stirred up with religious and political reform movements. The Gonfaloniere, Francesco Burlamacchi, hoped to end the dominion of Cosimo I de' Medici and the temporal power of the Church in that region, and to create a federation of free Tuscan cities. To this end he advocated to the Comune the formation of a special militia which he should lead. Burlamacchi himself was not Lutheran, but the various Protestant groups in the city (reflecting its mercantile and intellectual exchange with Germany) might approve his project.

When Curio arrived, there was already a large active colony of Italian internal religious exiles, including Paolo Lazise, Celso Martinengo, the Jewish convert Emanuele Tremellio, Peter Martyr and Girolamo Zanchi. From June 1541 Peter Martyr was Prior of the Basilica of San Frediano, a position of considerable authority: he held a school for reading in the Gospels, the letters of St Paul, and Saint Augustine, and encouraged direct reading and understanding of the Bible. His lessons were attended by young students and learned elders such as Curio himself and the humanist Francesco Robortello alike.

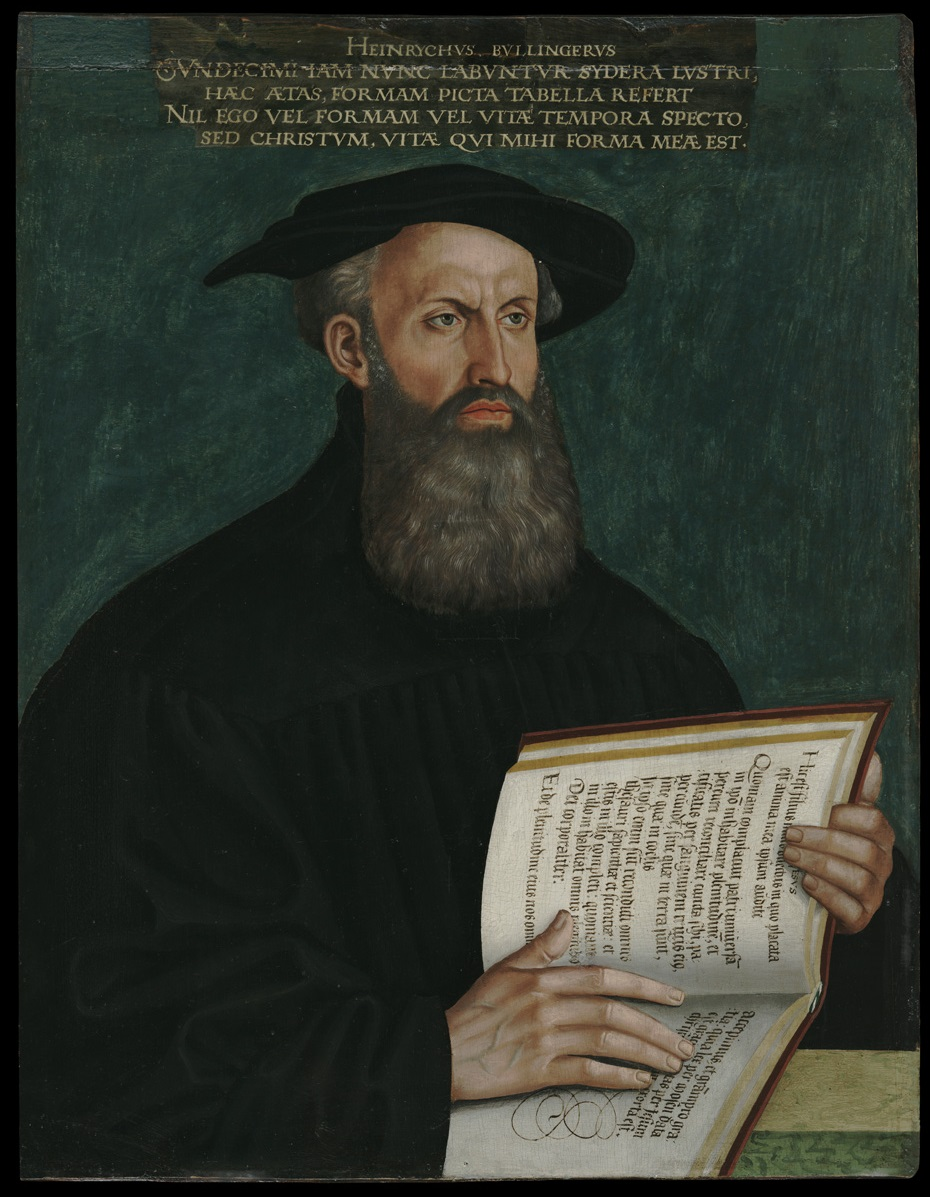
Heinrich Bullinger

Cardinal Bartolomeo Guidiccioni, non-resident Bishop of Lucca newly appointed to the Roman Inquisition, in a letter to the Senate of Lucca dated 22 July 1542 denounced that Evangelic group and that "Cellio who dwells in the house of Master Niccolò Arnolfini". Burlamacchi's plan to subject the citizen power to his political and religious reforms was exposed. At the end of July Peter Martyr, the young disciple Giulio Terenziano, Lazise and Tremellius fled, while Curio took refuge at first in Pisa, where the Inquisition tried to catch up with him. Cardinal Alessandro Farnese, on 26 August 1542, sent to Duke Cosimo from Rome the warrant for the arrest for that "wretched spirit called Celio of Turin", who however had already taken the road to Switzerland and was received, at the recommendation of the theologian Heinrich Bullinger, in the Academy of Lausanne.

== In Switzerland ==
With letters of recommendation from Konrad Pellikan and Heinrich Bullinger, Curio went by Bern to Geneva. He had crossed the frontier in Valtellina in company with another heretic, the antitrinitarian Camillo Renato, whom he described to Bullinger as "very outstanding in letters and religion" and "good and learned among the best". Eventually he obtained a place as Praefectus studiorum in the Latin school at Lausanne. In 1544 his plainly anticlerical and antipapistical dialogue Pasquillus Extaticus et Marphorius made its first appearance in a collection of Pasquinades, Pasquillorum Tomi Duo, by various authors, which Curio introduced through the press of Giovanni Oporino at Basel. Pasquillus Extaticus acquired a great following throughout Europe, and rapidly appeared independently of the collection in several different languages.

Curio ventured back incognito into Italy to collect his wife and children from Lucca, and his movements were dogged by papal agents. While staying at an inn at Pescia, a senior bailiff came in looking for him. Curio was dining, and jumped up with a meat knife in his hand. The captain cowered in a corner, and Curio walked straight out past the guards outside, leapt on his horse and rode off. He was obliged to leave the youngest child Dorotea in care of the family of the humanist Aonio Paleario. He went on to Ferrara to deliver to Duchess Renata the Commentarii in Matthaeum which Bullinger had entrusted to him.

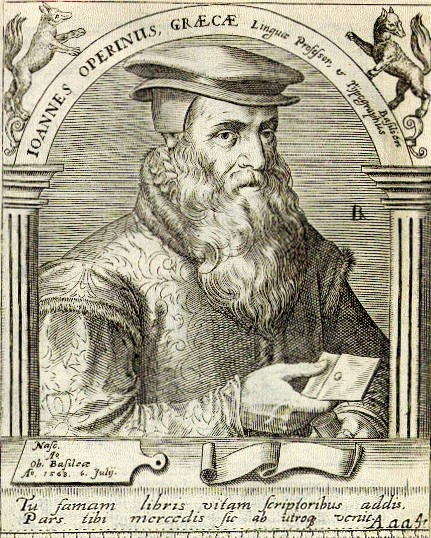
Ioannes Oporinus

Returning to Lausanne, where three more daughters were born to him, he maintained a diffident attitude towards the Calvinist theology prevalent there, but avoided open polemic or dissention. He revised his Aranei Encomion, publishing a second edition at Basel in 1544 under the title Araneus, seu De Providentia Dei, with which were included several shorter tracts including one on the Immortality of the Spirit, drawing overtly upon Pythagorean and Platonist concepts. He finished a new book, the Pro Vera et Antiqua Ecclesiae Christi Autoritate. In 1546 he had to leave Lausanne over an affair with a female student.

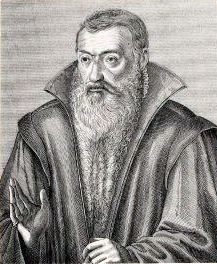
Ioannes Sturmius

In Basel, where he was reunited with his family, he held a teaching post at the university from 1547. Here he remained for the rest of his life as Professor of Rhetoric, as editor and translator. His circle of friends in Basel included theologian Martin Borrhaus, printers including Hieronymus Froben and Giovanni Oporino, and the academic jurist Bonifacius Amerbach. He maintained contact with other religious exiles, including Sebastian Castellio (who had left Geneva in 1544 having fallen out with Calvin), and with the Italian Lelio Sozzini. It is not agreed whether he was then in contact with the Netherlander David Joris, later sentenced as an heretic. From Basel he maintained a wide network of correspondence, principally with Bullinger, but also with Wolfgang Musculus, Johannes Sturm, Philipp Melanchthon and other theologians. Curio published part of his correspondence in 1553 (Selectarum Epistolarum).

As Professor he gained high respect: he took on many students, some of whom lodged in his house, and had contact with the many Polish students who were then in Basel. Deeply interested in the English Reformation, Curio, who had prepared a Latin translation of a sermon of Bernardino Ochino published in 1544, made the most of Ochino's presence in Basel in 1547. When Ochino travelled into exile in England in that year he was carrying books and letters of introduction from Curio to Sir John Cheke, preceptor to King Edward VI.

== Publishing activities ==
Along with his Pasquino Curio at first published educational writings and books for students in Basel. In 1551 in the press of Johannes Hervagius he dedicated to Amerbach his richly augmented edition of the Ciceronian lexicon of Marius Nizolius. He also busied himself as a theological writer. He contributed a Preface to a Life of Francesco Spiera published by Matteo Gribaldi with Pietro Paolo Vergerio in 1550. When Castellio in 1554 strongly attacked the conviction of Michael Servetus in a published writing, Curio was suspected of being his co-author by John Calvin and Theodore Beza.

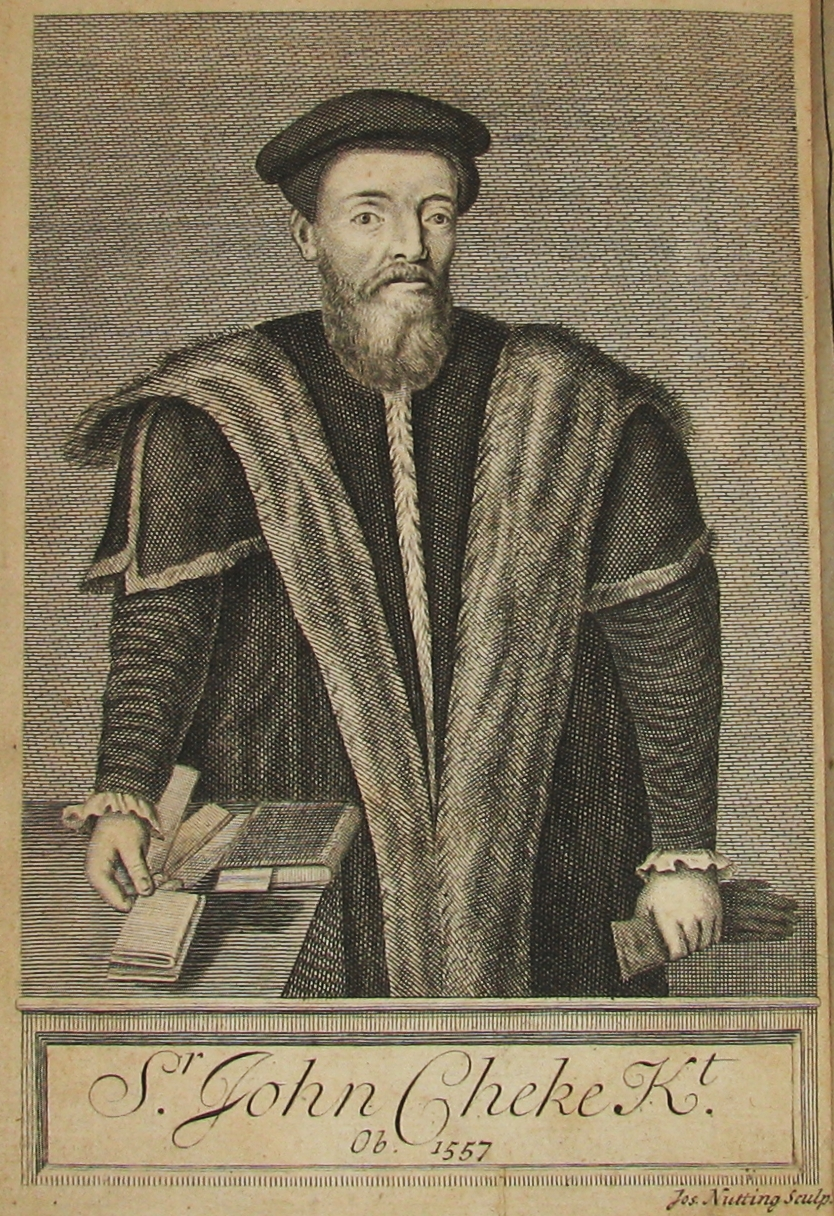
Ioannes Checus Anglus

He gained much attention with his work De Amplitudine Beati Regni Dei (1554), partly presented as a dialogue with Agostino Mainardi. On account of the incendiary nature of the theological opinions expressed in it, he had it published not in Basel but in Poschiavo, to circumvent the Basel censor. This work was dedicated to the Polish King Sigismund. It was rejected by some of Curio's friends, and also by Bullinger. It was heavily attacked by Vergerio (like Curio a religious exile from Italy, whose Otto Difensioni Curio had published, introduced and defended) and Curio was denounced as an heretic before the Council at Basel: he was able to clear himself largely before the inquisition of the censors.

Through these experiences Curio drew back from theological publication, but he remained in correspondence with the apostles of the Reformation. In 1554 Sir John Cheke met him in Strasbourg, soon after leaving England in voluntary exile following the accession of Queen Mary, by whom the English reforms were reversed. Cheke was carrying the seven letters which had passed between him and Stephen Gardiner, Bishop of Winchester, in 1544, when Gardiner had issued a severe prohibition against Cheke's reforms of ancient Greek pronunciation in the University of Cambridge. Gardiner's letters showed his unpleasant side.

Cheke explained the significance of the letters to Curio and entrusted them to him. In the following year Curio had them published at Basel without Cheke's knowledge, and they attracted wide interest. Curio's preface is full of admiration for the teaching of Cheke and Sir Anthony Cooke, and elsewhere extols the learning of Sir Thomas Wroth (all intimates of Edward VI), with whom he dealt in their travels in exile. On the orders of King Philip Cheke was seized and intimidated into an involuntary formal recantation in 1556. Curio dedicated his second and later editions of the works of Olympia Fulvia Morata to Queen Elizabeth I of England.

== The last years ==
Curio now became more active as editor and as author of historical writings. Hervagius and Brand published his edition of Seneca's works in 1557. He communicated materials concerning the martyrs Galeazzo Trezio, Pomponio Algerio and Fra Goffredo Varaglia to the historian Heinrich Pantaleon. He is particularly remembered for his editions of the works of the humanist poet Olympia Fulvia Morata, and his correspondence with her. As an historian he is still appreciated for his History of the Siege of Malta (1565). His editions and commentaries on classical works range from his Thesaurus Linguae Latinae to the Aristotelis Stagiritae Tripartitae Philosophiae Opera Omnia, from the Commentarii a Cicerone, Tacito, Plauto, Sallustio ed Emilio Probo, to the Quattro Libri dei Logices Elementorum of Aristotle. Particularly notable from his last years was his Latin translation of the History of Francesco Guicciardini, dedicated to Charles IX of France and printed by Pietro Perna in 1566, which placed an essential work of Italian historiography at the disposal of students throughout Europe.

Three of Curio's daughters died of the plague in 1564, including Angela, who had helped him in his philological researches. His son Orazio, physician and philosopher (died 1564), and Agostino (died 1567) were, like their father, active in publishing, and died before their time. The humanist Agostino was the editor of Pietro Bembo, author of the Sarracenicae Historiae and the De Ratione Conseguendi Styli, seu De Imitatione, and was professor from 1564 in the University of Basel. Only Leone survived his father (1601): he left a manuscript Memoir of his father. A final twist was the death of his friend Giovanni Oporino in 1568, for whom he wrote his Mortis Ioannis Oporini Praesagia, published with the Oratio for Oporino by Andrea Jociscus: it was like a presage of his own death, which occurred at Basel on 24 November 1569. He was buried near his sons in Basel Cathedral, where his wife Margherita (who long survived him) was buried in 1587. His Panegyric was delivered at Basel in 1570 by Johann Nikolaus Stupanus, who succeeded him in the Chair of Rhetoric.

The woodcut portrait of Curio is an illustration from Nikolaus Reusner's 1587 collection of images of men of letters. An example is held in the British Museum collections.

== Works (selection) ==
The mark of Pietro Perna

- Aranei Encomion. Venice, 1540. digitized
- Aranaeus, seu De Providentia Dei, with De Immortalitate Animorum and other shorter tracts. Basel, 1544. digitized
- Pasquillus Extaticus et Marphorius (the Latin original), in Pasquillorum Tomi Duo, II, pp. 426-529 digitized. Basel, 1544. Pasquillus Ecstaticus (separate publication), Geneva 1544, digitized
  - (dt.) Der verzucket Pasquinus. Auss Welscher sprach inn das Teütsch gebracht. Augsburg 1543(?). digitized
  - (it.) Pasqvino in Estasi, Nuouo, e molto più pieno, ch'el primo, insieme co'l viaggio de l'Inferno. Rome(?) 1545. digitized
  - (fr.) Les Visions de Pasquille, with the Dialogue de Probus. Geneva, 1547. digitized
  - (en.) Pasquine in a Traunce. London, 1566. Eebo transcript digitized 1566 edition, digitized 1584 edition
- Pro Vera et Antiqua Ecclesiae Christi Autoritate, Basel, 1547. digitized
- Selectarvm Epistolarum Libri duo, Basel, 1553. digitized
- De Amplitudine Beati Regni Dei, Basel, (Poschiavo?) 1554. digitized
- Schola, sive De Perfecto Grammatico, with De Liberis Honeste et Pie Educandis. Basel, 1555. digitized
- De Bello Melitensi Historia Nova. Basel 1567. digitized
  - (dt.) Neuwe unnd warhafftige Historien, von dem erschröcklichen Krieg so der Türckisch Keyser Solyman wider die Ritter von Jerusalem, in der Inseln Malta kürtzlich gefüret hat. Basel, 1567.
  - (it.) Nuova Storia della Guerra in Malta. Rome, 1927.
  - (en.) A New History of the War in Malta. Rome, 1928.
- De Historia Legenda Sententia ad Basilium Amerbachium. Basel, 1576.

== Sources ==
- UUA.org Curione
- K. Benrath, 'Curione, Celio Secondo', Realencyclopaedie für protestantische Theologie und Kirche (Leipzig, 1898), vol. 4, pp. 353–357.
- A. Biondi, 'Curione, Celio Secondo', Dizionario Biografico degli Italiani (Roma 1981) vol. 31, pp. 443–449.
- D. Cantimori (1902–1966), Eretici Italiani del Cinquecento: Ricerche storiche (3rd Edn) (Firenze 1978); Biblioteca di cultura storica (Einaudi, 1992).
- 'Curione, Celio Secondo (1503–1569)', The Oxford Encyclopedia of the Reformation (2005).
