= Bibliotheca selecta =

1592 bibliographical encyclopedia by Antonio Possevino

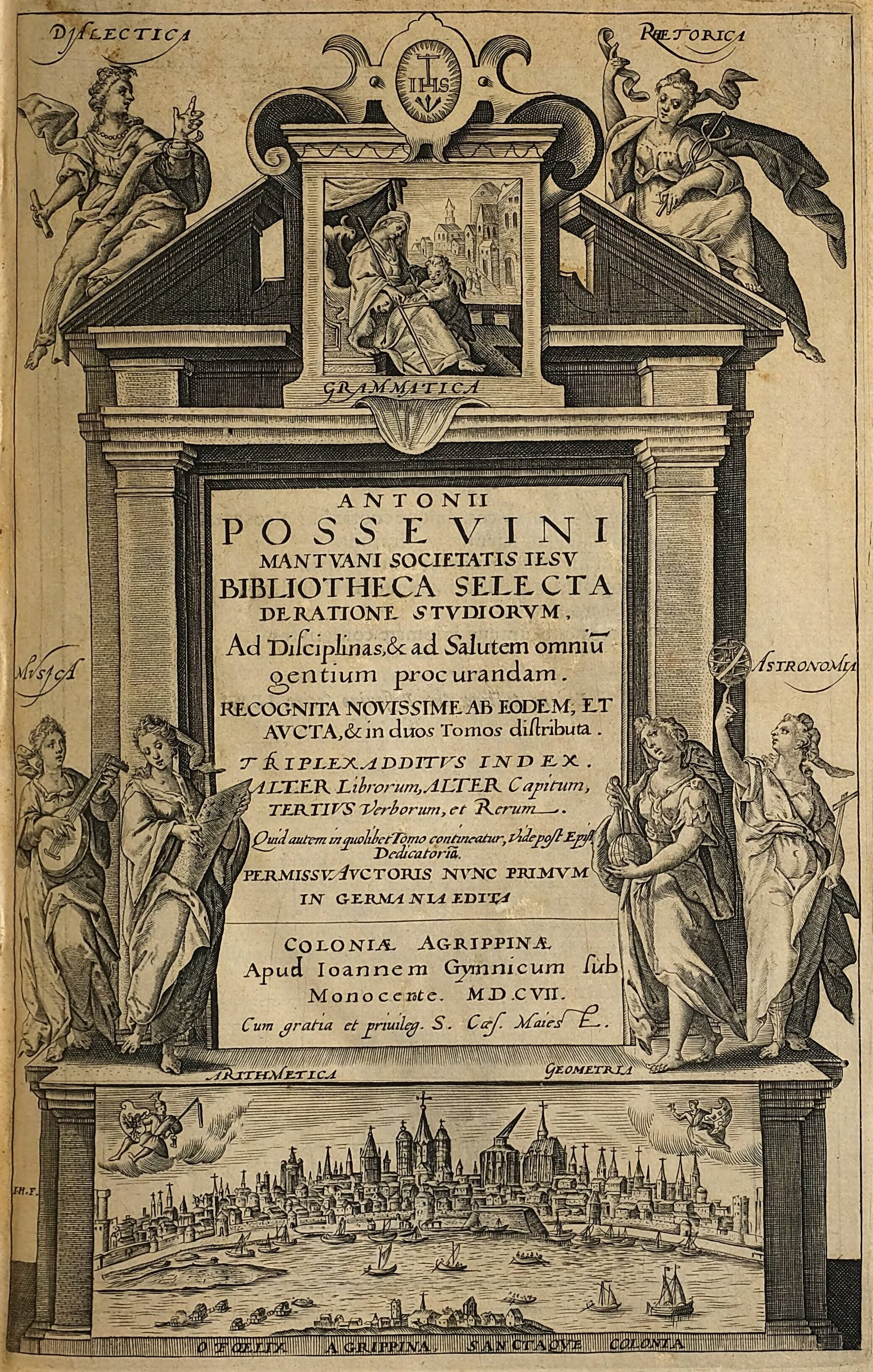
- Cover page
- Full title: Bibliotheca selecta de ratione studiorum in Historia, In Disciplinis, in salute omnium procuranda
- Author(s): Antonio Possevino
- Language: Latin
- Date: 1598
- Genre: Bibliographical encyclopedia

Bibliotheca selecta (full title Bibliotheca selecta de ratione studiorum in Historia, In Disciplinis, in salute omnium procuranda) is a bibliographical encyclopedia by the Jesuit Antonio Possevino, printed in two folio volumes at the Typographia Apostolica Vaticana by Domenico Basa in 1593. It represents an authoritative and up-to-date Jesuit compendium of Counter-Reformation knowledge.

== Background ==
Bibliotheca selecta is a two-volume bibliographical encyclopedia compiled by Jesuit scholar and diplomat Antonio Possevino. It was printed in Rome in 1593 at the Tipografia Apostolica Vaticana by Domenico Basa, and modern reference works describe it as a project that lists and comments on works Possevino considered essential for a complete Christian humanistic culture.

The 1593 printing was licensed and supported by Pope Clement VIII and was examined by both Jesuit scholars and members of the Congregation for the Index before publication. Bibliotheca selecta has been described as a catalogue of books considered necessary for Catholic education and as outlining an "ideal library", and it has been studied in relation to Jesuit approaches to the selection and organisation of approved reading.

== Content ==
Part I (Books 1–11) is dedicated to Pope Clement VIII with the imprimatur of Jesuit general Claudio Acquaviva. It begins with an introduction that traces the Idea et causae operis (Idea and the cause of work) to the 1560s in France when as a Jesuit superior Possevino started fighting the anti-heretical battle of the books. From Lyons and Avignon he had seen the challenge to the orthodoxy of Rome and the Council of Trent represented by Konrad Gesner's Bibliotheca universalis, the ground-breaking encyclopedia expressing the Erasmian culture of Swiss and German Reformers, a work immediately banned by church censors. To begin, Possevino discourses on the principles of Jesuit humanist pedagogy enunciated in the Ratio studiorum in a preliminary section, Cultura ingeniorum.

This part, as several others, went through several separate editions and an Italian translation by Possevino. Among these was an edition dedicated to the Russian False Dmitriy I. The theological presentation of the several books outlines a comprehensive bibliography on theology, scholastic, catechetical and controversial, and incorporates works by such contemporary Jesuit missionaries as Alessandro Valignano and Edmund Campion.

Part II is dedicated to king Sigismund III Vasa of Poland, one of the contemporary rulers under Possevino's Counter Reformation tutelage. From Books 12 through 18 he summarizes the literature and bibliography for law {12}, philosophy {13} and medicine (14). Possevino is creating an authorized bibliography of the traditional arts and sciences elaborating the humanistic educational precepts of the Jesuit Ratio Studiorum. The liberal arts are dealt with in the final books on architecture and geography {15}, history {16} poetry & painting {17} and rhetoric {18}. The major thrust of Possevino's orthodox compendium is the creation of a bibliography of the humanist culture of the Late Renaissance that is both confidently encyclopedic and outspokenly anti-heretical. The criterion of orthodoxy is underscored in his previous Iudicium de Nuae, Iohannis Bodini, Philippe-Mornaei et Machiavelli scriptis, 1592, which placed the works of leading writers such as Niccolò Machiavelli and Jean Bodin on the Index Librorum Prohibitorum.

In addition to two revised folio editions of the Bibliotheca selecta printed in Venice, 1603 and Cologne, 1607, several books were reprinted in separate editions, notably Book 16, as Apparatus ad omnium gentium historiam, a thorough bibliography of the ancient and contemporary literature of world history reworking, expurgating and updating Bodin's Methodus ad facilem historiarum cognitionem(1566). Book 18 was published separately as a rhetorical treatise, Cicero collatus cum Etnicis et sacris scriptoribus.
