= Magistra vitae =

Latin expression

Magistra vitae is a Latin expression, used by Cicero in his De Oratore as a female personification of history, translated as "mistress of life", or "life's teacher" in a female sense. Often paraphrased as Historia magistra vitae est, it conveys the idea that the study of the past should serve as a lesson to the future, and was an important pillar of classical, medieval and Renaissance historiography. Modern usage includes it as a motto of Madaripur Museum in Bangladesh.

The complete phrase, with English translation, is:

Historia vero testis temporum, lux veritatis, vita memoriae, magistra vitae, nuntia vetustatis, qua voce alia nisi oratoris immortalitati commendatur?

By what other voice than that of the orator is history, the true witness of times, the light of truth, the life of memory, the mistress of life, the heraldress of antiquity, committed to immortality?

Cicero, De Oratore, II, 36.

== Bibliography ==
- Cicero, Marcus Tullius (1860). On oratory and orators. Translated by Watson, J. S. New York: Harper & Brothers.
- Cicero, Marcus Tullius (1862). De oratore. Leipzig: B.G. Teubner.
