= Giovanni Battista Ciotti =

Italian publisher and typographer

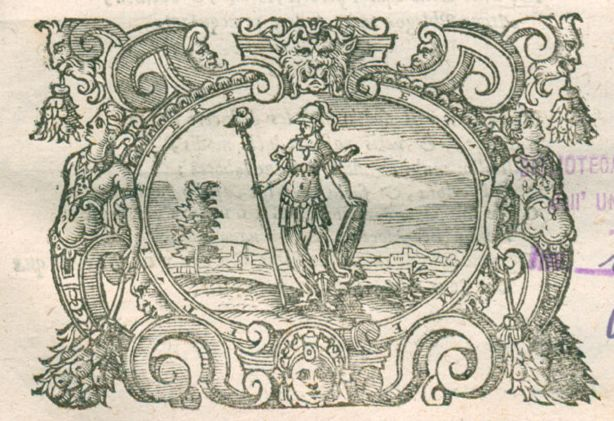
A Minerva armed with a spear and shield depicted on the printer's mark of Giovanni Battista Ciotti

Giovanni Battista Ciotti, or Ciotto (Siena, 1560 – Palermo, 1625), was an Italian publisher and typographer.

== Biography ==
Born in Siena, Ciotti moved to Venice at a very young age where he frequented the circle of typographers and booksellers. He began to print on his own in 1583. Ciotti's publishing production, at first sporadic, gradually increased starting from 1591, the year in which he became the owner of his own publishing shop and adopted the image of a Minerva armed with a spear and shield as his publisher's device. About sixty books published by Ciotti before 1600 have been recorded, with an average of more than five publications a year, a number that increased in the new century. All editions were printed in Venice, except for one work by Antonio Piccioli published in Bergamo in 1587. In the last decade of the 16th century he became the owner of the prints of the Venetian Academy; therefore from 1594 on the title page of some works published by Ciotti his name is defined as "librarian and printer of the Venetian Academy", while from 1606 the nickname "Academico Venetiano" will appear. In 1597 he adopted as an emblem of his workshop "at the sign of the Dawn", represented by a celestial woman among the clouds with a star on her head, who precedes the sun, reducing the night darkness and dispensing light. From 1607 to 1615 Ciotti joined forces with Bernardo Giunta, giving rise to an enterprise which published at least 87 editions in nine years; the two used a sumptuous letterpress representing Tuscany with the ducal crown on the head and the Giunti lily in the left hand. Ciotti often did not limit himself to the activity of typographer, but also assumed the functions of editor of the books, introducing dedications and prefaces signed by him to the works that came out of his workshop. He therefore had considerable relationships with the authors. Alongside legal books and ancient classics, Ciotti published numerous editions of scientific texts and, above all, of literary works and religious and theological writings. Ciotti was one of the most active international publishers of his day. He regularly visited the Frankfurt Book Fair from 1583 onwards. In 1590, in Frankfurt, he met Giordano Bruno, to whom he transmitted the invitation of the Venetian patrician Giovanni Mocenigo to move to Venice.

On his first visit to Venice in 1602 Giambattista Marino made friends with Ciotti, who immediately began a long association with him by undertaking the publication in that same year of the first and second parts of his Rime. Ciotti brought out innumerable editions of his works during the next twenty years or more, and a number of his letters to Ciotti have been published.

Sometimes the relationships with the authors led to accidents and misunderstandings; for example, Ciotti acted as a sort of agent of Marino in Venice, maintaining personal relationships for him, providing him with books and works of art, often refusing to be paid; in 1614, however, Marino denounced Ciotti for whom the publisher was imprisoned by the Venetian magistracy and sentenced to pay 25 ducats; however, the relations between the two were not interrupted and Marino ended up recognizing the good faith of the bookseller in the incident. Ciotti also had stormy relations with Alessandro Tassoni and Tommaso Stigliani. Tommaso Stigliani narrates that starting from 1616 Ciotti, having broken his association with Giunti, "moved his printing press to Sicily"; on the island, however, the publisher collapsed "there, in the narrow space of six months he failed, went mad, blinded and died". However, neither the date nor the place of his death, which probably occurred in Palermo, is known.

== Bibliography ==
- Giovan Battista Marino, Lettere, edited by Marziano Guglielminetti, Torino 1966, ad Indicem;
- Tommaso Stigliani, Lettere, Roma 1651, pp. 163-174 (see Giovan Battista Marino, Epistolario, edited by A. Borzelli, F. Nicolini, II, Bari 1912. pp. 327 s.);
- Alessandro Tassoni, Lettere, edited by G. Rossi, I, Bologna 1901, pp. 18, 20, 24, 25, 28 et seq., 34, 40, 50, 53 s., 56 s., 77, 79, 80 s., 84-87, 102, 137, 140, 248; II, ibid. 1910, pp. 3-10, 21, 23, 25-28, 35 s., 61, 64, 67;
- Paolo Sarpi, Lettere ai protestanti, edited by M. D. Busnelli, II, Bari 1931, pp. 46, 54, 58, 60, 62, 70 s., 74, 76, 81, 86, 99, 115 (see Paolo Sarpi, Lettere ai gallicani, edited by Boris Ulianich, Wiesbaden 1961, pp. CII-CIII);
- Emanuele Antonio Cicogna, Delle Inscrizioni Veneziane, V, Venezia 1842, p. 611;
- Franz Heinrich Reusch, Der Index der verbotenen Bücher, II, Bonn 1885, p. 323;
- Luigi Amabile, Fra Tommaso Campanella ne' castelli di Napoli, in Roma ed in Parigi, Napoli 1887, I, pp. 66-68, 84, 100, 107, 112-114; II, Documenti, pp. 27 s., 31, 33, 39, 42, 45 (see Giovanni Gentile, Studi sul Rinascimento, Firenze 1923, pp. 183-86);
- Domenico Berti, Giordano Bruno da Nola. Sua vita e sua dottrina, Torino 1889, pp. 245 et seq., 470;
- Horatio Brown, The Venetian Printing Press 1469-1800, London 1891, pp. 131, 161;
- Giuseppe Fumagalli, Lexicon typographicum Italiae, Florence 1905, pp. 501, 504;
- Vincenzo Spampanato, Vita di Giordano Bruno, II, Messina 1921, ad Indicem;
- Ester Pastorello, Tipografi, editori, librai a Venezia nel secolo XVI, Firenze 1924, pp. 21 et seq.;
- Michele Maylender, Storia delle Accademie d'Italia, V, Bologna 1930, pp. 436 et seq.;
- Vincenzo Spampanato, Documenti della vita di Giordano Bruno, Firenze 1933, pp. 61, 69-73;
- Arthur Lotz, Bibliographie der Modelbücher, Leipzig 1933, pp. 216 s.;
- Niccolò Domenico Evola, Ricerche storiche sulla tipografia siciliana, Firenze 1940, p. 56;
- Angelo Mercati, Il sommario del Processo di Giordano Bruno, Città del Vaticano 1942, ad Indicem;
- Luigi Firpo, Il processo di Giordano Bruno, in Rivista storica italiana, LX (1948), pp. 555 et seq.;
- Luigi Firpo, Sulla data di una lettera politica del Tasso, in Giornale storico della letteratura italiana, CXXV (1948), p. 103 (see Torquato Tasso, Lettere, V, Pisa 1827, pp. 273 s.);
- K. T. Butler, Giacomo Castelvetro 1546-1616, in Italian Studies, V (1950), pp. 18 et seq.;
- Giuliano Pesenti, Libri censurati a Venezia nei secoli XVI-XVII, in La Bibliofilia, LXVIII (1956), p. 28;
- Gaetano Cozzi, Il doge Nicolò Contarini. Ricerche sul patriziato veneziano agli inizi del Seicento, Venezia-Roma 1958, p. 49;
- Short-Title Catalogue of Books printed... from 1465 to 1600, now in the British Museum, London 1958, p. 808;
- Paolo Camerini, Annali dei Giunti, I, Venezia, parte II, Firenze 1963, pp. 487 et seq.;
- Frances Yates, Giordano Bruno e la tradizione ermetica, Bari 1969, pp. 367-69, 376 et seq.;
- Paul F. Grendler, The Roman Inquisition and the Venetian Press, 1540-1605, Princeton 1977, pp. 17, 228, 280.
- Ian Maclean (2013). "Ciotti and Plantin". La Bibliofilía. 115 (1): 135–146. JSTOR 26198991.
