= Celio Augustino Curione =

Celio Augustino Curione (1538–1567) was an Italian scholar and reformer who held the chair of rhetoric at Basel. He is best known for his History of the Saracens, which was translated into English by Thomas Newton.

== Life ==
Celio Augustino Curione was born in 1538 in Salò sul Garda in Brescia. He was the son of the reformer Celio Secondo Curione and Margherita Bianca Isacchi. In 1546 the family moved to Basel, where he attended the university and studied under his father. He then studied at the University of Tubingen, in Paris, Bourge and Toulouse and eventually Bologna where he studied jurisprudence.

Curione edited the works of Pietro Bembo, and the Hieroglyphica of Pierio Valeriano Bolzani. His History of the Saracens was dedicated to Emperor Maximilian II. His sources included De futuris Christianorum triumphis in Turchos et Saracenos by Annio da Viterbo, works by the Byzantine emperor John VI Kantakouzenos and above all the Annales of the Byzantine chronicler George Kedrenos.

He died in Basel on 24 October 1567.

== Works ==
- De ratione consequendi styli seu de imitazione. 1563
- De quattuor Coelii Secundi Curionis filiarum vita atque obitu. 1563
- Petri Bembi ... quecumque usquam prodierunt operates in unum corpus collectio, and now demum ab C . A .Curione cum optimis exemplaribus collata et diligentissime punished. 1567.
- Sarracenicae historiae libri III. 1567
- (ed.) Hieroglyphica, sive de sacris Aegyptiorum aliarumque gentium commentarii by Pierio Valeriano Bolzani. 1567.
