= Sebastián Fox Morcillo =

Sebastian Fox Morcillo (1526?–1559?), a Spanish scholar and philosopher, was born in Seville between 1526 and 1528. Around 1548 he studied in Leuven, in the Habsburg Netherlands. Following the example of the Spanish Jew Judah Abarbanel, he published commentaries on Plato and Aristotle, in which he endeavoured to reconcile their teachings. In 1559 he was appointed tutor to Don Carlos, son of Philip II, but he was lost at sea on his way to Spain to take up the post.

His best-known work is De imitatione, seu de informandi styli ratione libri II (1554), a dialogue between the author and his brother under the pseudonyms of Gaspar and Francisco Enuesia.

== Works ==
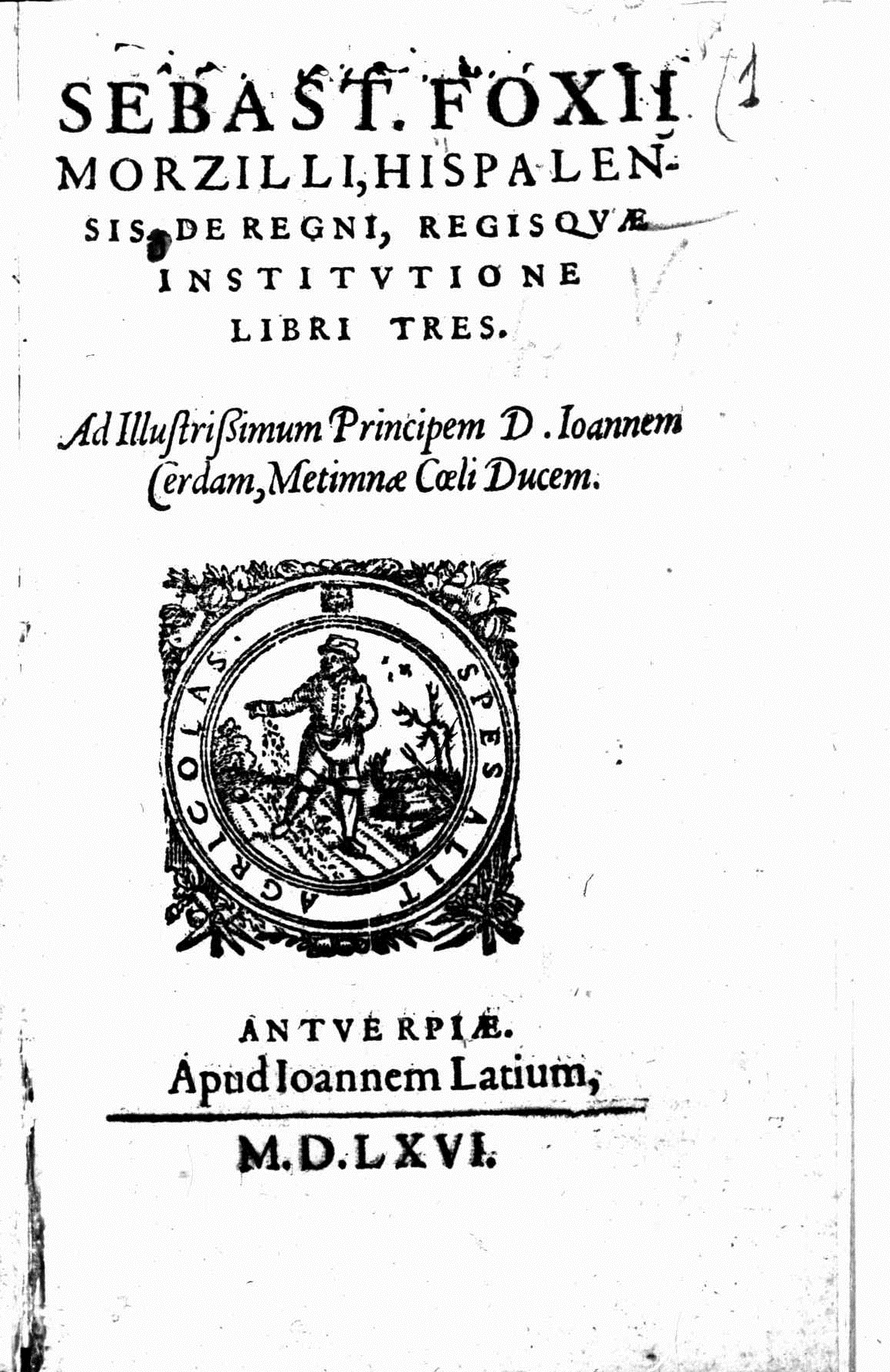
De regni regisquae institutione, 1566

- In Topica Ciceronis paraphrasis et scholia, 1550, 8vo
- De imitatione, seu de informandi styli ratione libri II, Amberes, 1554
- De naturæ philosophia seu de Platonis et Aristotelis consensione libri quinque, 1554
- In Platonis Timaeum commentarii, 1554
- Ethices philosophiae compendium ex Platone, Aristotele aliisque optimos quibusque auctoribus collectum, 1554
- De Philosophici studii ratione, Lovaina, 1554
- De naturae philosophia seu de Platonis et Aristotelis consensione, libri V, Lovaina 1554
- De juventute, Basilea, 1556
- De regni regisque institutione libri III, Amberes, 1556
  - De regni regisquae institutione (in Latin). Antwerp: Jan Laet. 1566.
- Comentatio in decem Platonis libros de Republica, 1556
- De demonstratione ejusque necessitate et vi liber I, Basilea, 1556
- De honore, Basilea, 1556
- De usu et exercitatione Dialecticae, 1556
- De historiae institutione dialogus, 1557 (Antonio Cortijo Ocaña, Teoría de la historia y teoría política en el siglo XVI. Alcalá de Henares: UP, 2000)

== Bibliography ==
- Cantarero de Salazar, Alejandro.-«Reexamen crítico de la biografía del humanista Sebastián Fox Morcillo (c. 1526- c. 1560)», Studia Aurea, 9, 2015, págs. 531–564. https://studiaaurea.com/article/view/v9-cantarero
- Cantarero de Salazar, Alejandro, «La mimesis conversacional en el corpus de diálogos de Sebastián Fox Morcillo: introducción a su estudio literario», eHumanista, 29, 2015, 305–341. <https://www.ehumanista.ucsb.edu/sites/secure.lsit.ucsb.edu.span.d7_eh/files/sitefiles/ehumanista/volume29/14%20ehum29.viv.cantarero.vd.pdf>
- Cantarero de Salazar, Alejandro, «Aproximación a la tradición editorial de la obra de Sebastián Fox Morcillo: Primer repertorio tipobibliográfico», Camenae, 17, 2015, 1-31. http://saprat.ephe.sorbonne.fr/revue-en-ligne-camenae-16.htm
- Cortijo Ocaña, Antonio, Teoría de la Historia y Teoría política en Sebastián Fox Morcillo. «De Historia Institutione Dialogus»/«Diálogo de la enseñanza de la Historia». Alcalá de Henares, Universidad de Alcalá de Henares, 2000.
- Espigares Pinilla, Antonio, La cuestión del honor y la gloria en el humanismo del siglo XVI a través del "Gonsalus" de Ginés de Sepúlveda y de "De Honore" de Fox Morcillo, Tesis doctoral, Universidad Complutense, Madrid, 1994.
- Espigares Pinilla, Antonio, "De honore". Estudio y traducción, Madrid, Universidad Complutense de Madrid, 2017.
- González de la Calle, Pedro Urbano, Sebastián Fox Morcillo. Estudio histórico-crítico de sus doctrinas, Madrid, Imprenta del Asilo de Huérfanos del Sagrado Corazón de Jesús, 1903.
- Pike, Ruth, «De converso origin of Sebastián Fox Morcillo», Hispania. A journal devoted to the interest of the teaching of Spanish and Portuguese, 51, 1968, 4, 877–882
- Pineda, Victoria, La imitación como arte en el siglo XVI español (Con una edición y traducción del diálogo "De imitatione" de Sebastián Fox Morcillo), Sevilla, Diputación Provincial de Sevilla, 1994.
