= David Chytraeus =

German Lutheran theologian, reformer, and historian

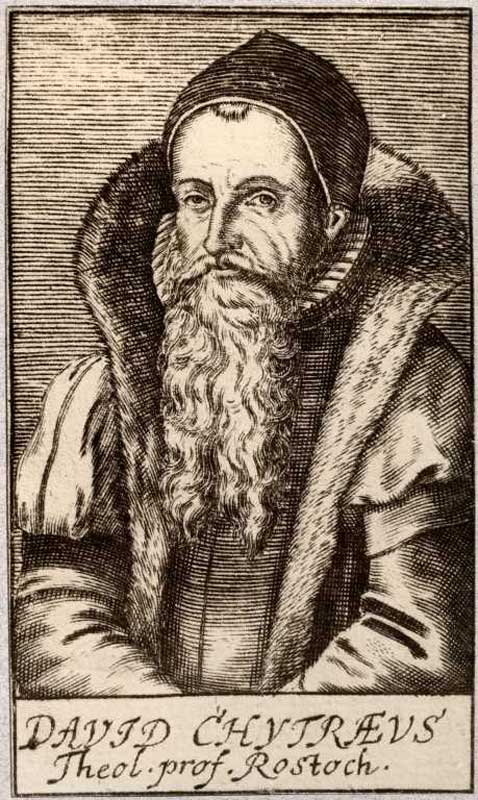
David Chytraeus

David Chytraeus or Chyträus (26 February 1530 – 25 June 1600) was a German Lutheran theologian, reformer and historian. He was a disciple of Philipp Melancthon.

Born at Ingelfingen, in the modern state of Baden-Württemberg, his real surname was Kochhafe (Upper German for "pipkin, pot for boiling"). This translates to χύτρα in Classical Greek, whence his Latinized pseudonym Chytraeus.

Chytraeus became a professor at the University of Rostock and was one of the co-authors of the Formula of Concord. He is known for his work as the author of a Protestant catechism. While the Latin original was first published in 1554, then reprinted in 1599, the text was translated into German only in 2016, by Susi-Hilde Michael.

In 1568 and at the instigation of Emperor Maximilian II, the Protestant estates of Lower Austria, represented by Leopold Grabner zu Rosenburg, Rüdiger von Starhemberg and Wolf Christoph von Enzersdorf, invited Chytraeus to work out a church order and an agenda for them.

He is the author of a treatise on music, De Musica, and a theological treatise, De Sacrificiis.

In August 1598, a Scottish diplomat, Peter Young, came to Rostock and discussed objections to Chytraeus's writings raised by James VI, concerning Mary, Queen of Scots. Chytraeus is said to have sent an amended version.

David Chytraeus died in Rostock, aged 70.
