= Francesco Robortello =

Italian Renaissance humanist

- Born: 9 September 1516; Udine, Republic of Venice
- Died: 18 March 1567; Padua, Republic of Venice
- Occupations: University teacher, Renaissance humanist, editor
- Movement: Renaissance

Francesco Robortello (Latin: Franciscus Robortellus; 1516–1567) was a Renaissance humanist, nicknamed Canis grammaticus ("the grammatical dog") for his confrontational and demanding manner.

== Work ==
Robortello, who was born in Udine, was an editor of rediscovered works of Antiquity, who taught philosophy and rhetoric, as well as ethics (following Aristotle), and Latin and Greek, roving from Padua through universities at Lucca, Pisa, Venice, Padua, and Bologna before finally returning to Padua in 1560.

Robortello's scientific approach to textual emendations laid the groundwork for modern Hermeneutics. His commentary on Aristotle's Poetics formed the basis for Renaissance and 17th-century theories of comedy, influential in writing for the theatre everywhere save in England. At the same time he was the conservative Aristotelian philosopher who urged a woman to submit her will to that of her husband on the basis of her moral weakness, in his libro politicos: Aristotelis disputatio (Venice, 1552, p. 175, quoted Comensoli 1989).

He followed his In librum Aristotelis de arte poetica explicationes (1548), in which he emended the Latin version of Alessandro de’ Pazzi (published 1536), with a paraphrase of Horace's Ars Poetica and with explications of genres missing in the surviving text of Aristotle: De Satyra, De Epigrammate, De Comoedia, De Salibus, De Elegia.

In the fields of philology and history, he sustained controversies in print with Carolus Sigonius and Vincenzo Maggi in the form of essay-like orations, correcting the editions published in Venice by Aldus Manutius, and even philological missteps of Erasmus. These brief essays were collected and published at intervals.

Robortello died at Padua, where, in the 1550s, one of his pupils was Giacomo Zabarella. Another pupil was Jan Kochanowski, a poet who wrote both in Polish and Latin and introduced the ideas, forms and spirit of the Renaissance into Polish literature.

== Main works ==
- De historica facultate disputatio (alternatively as De arte historica), 1548; 1567. An incunable of historiography.
- De rhetorica facultate, 1548
- In Aristotelis poeticam explicationes, Florence 1548, 2nd edition 1555. Reinterpreting Aristotle's Poetics for the humanist.
- Dionysi Longini rhetoris praestantissimi liber de grandi sive sublimiorationis genere ... cum adnotationibus, Basel 1554. Recovering the lost literary criticism of Longinus, On the Sublime.
- Thesaurus criticus, 1557, second edition, 1604
- De arte, sive ratione corrigendi antiquorum libros disputatio, Florence 1548; 2nd edition 1562 This "Lecture on the art and method of correcting the books of the old writers" was one of the first critical discussions of the methodologies to apply in correcting texts of Antiquity.
- De artificio dicendi 1567. A textbook of rhetoric.
