= Outline of Protestantism =

Overview of and topical guide to Protestantism

The following outline is provided as an overview of and topical guide to Protestantism:

Protestantism – form of Christian faith and practice which arose out of the Protestant Reformation, a movement against what the Protestants considered to be errors in the Roman Catholic Church. It is one of the major branches of the Christian religion, together with Roman Catholicism and Eastern Orthodoxy.

== Nature of Protestantism ==
- Theism
  - Monotheism
    - Abrahamic religions
      - Christianity
        - Nicene Christianity
          - Chalcedonian Christianity
            - Western Christianity
              - Protestantism

=== Beliefs of Protestants ===
- the Five Solas
  - Sola Fide – by faith alone (the sole instrument of justification, no works involved)
  - Sola Scriptura – by scripture alone (theological disputes are to be resolved by appealing ultimately to the Bible, the sole infallible authority of Christian doctrine and practice as opposed to the belief in the infallibility of the magisterium or tradition)
  - Sola Gratia – (salvation) by grace alone (without any personal merit)
  - Solus Christus – Christ alone (Jesus Christ as the only mediator between God and man as opposed to the intercession of saints or Mary)
  - Soli Deo Gloria – glory to God alone (no veneration of Mary, angels or the saints)

== Branches of Protestantism ==
- Magisterial Protestantism
  - Lutheranism – a major branch of the reformation, adhering to the theology of Martin Luther.
  - Anglicanism – churches with historical connections to the Church of England.
  - Calvinism – a Protestant theological system based in large part on the teachings of reformer John Calvin.
    - Continental Reformed Christianity – Calvinist churches which trace their origin in the European continent.
    - Presbyterianism – Calvinist churches which trace their origin in the Church of Scotland or the Westminster Assembly, with governance by elders (presbyters)
    - Congregationalism – English separatists adhering to Calvinist views, with a congregationalist governance.
  - Arminianism – a Protestant theological movement based on the teachings of Jacobus Arminius.
- Radical Protestantism
  - Anabaptist – part of the Radical Reformation of 16th-century Europe. Many consider Anabaptism to be a distinct movement from Protestantism. Amish, Hutterites, and Mennonites are descendants of the movement.
- Evangelical Protestantism
  - Baptist – English separatists distinguished by baptizing professing Christian believers only.
  - Methodism – a revival movement within the Church of England which later became a separate tradition.
  - Pentecostalism – a movement within Christianity putting particular emphasis on the direct experience of God in the form of the Holy Spirit.

== Interdenominational movements ==
- High church – a movement within Protestantism (especially in Anglican and Lutheran traditions) to employ a very formal style of worship, similar to that of the Catholic Church.
- Pietism – a Protestant movement born out of 17th century Lutheranism which emphasizes individual piety over ritualism. It is accused by its opponents as downplaying doctrine.
- Evangelicalism – a Protestant Christian movement (having roots in the Pietist movement) which grew prominent in the 18th and 19th centuries during the Great Awakenings; it emphasizes personal conversion and individual piety as well as unity between different Christian denominations with the scope of spreading the Gospel (something they all share in common), while acknowledging the doctrinal differences that set them apart.
- Ecumenism – a Christian movement, not particular to Protestantism, which seeks reconciliation between Christian denominations (Protestant as well as others) on doctrinal issues with the chief goal of reunification.
- Holiness movement – a 19th-century movement with roots in Wesleyan–Arminian theology which asserts that entire sanctification can be achieved as a second work of grace. This movement comprises multiple Protestant traditions such as: Methodists, Anabaptists, Quakers and Pentecostals.
- Liberalism – a movement which is rooted in enlightenment thinking and emphasizes doctrinal reinterpretation (in light of new scientific discoveries) over creedalism, tradition or church authority.
- Confessionalism – a Protestant movement, opposed to both Ecumenism and Liberalism, which refers to denominations that hold to their particular doctrines as they are defined in their confessions of faith, as opposed to striving for doctrinal reconciliation with other denominations. Adherents to the movement tend to be dogmatic and have a very well structured Systematic theology.
- Fundamentalism – a response to Liberalism, this movement is characterised by an unwavering devotion to the Bible to the point of Biblical literalism (with no room for allegorical or figurative interpretations). For this reason it has been accused of being a form of anti-intellectualism.
- Confessing Movement – a movement within Liberal churches, which seeks to accomplish a conservative resurgence.
- Charismatic movement – an interdenominational movement in traditional non-Pentecostal denominations which emphasizes contemporary experience of the gifts of the Holy Spirit.
- Progressivism – a movement which is rooted in postmodern thinking and emphasizes theological diversity (to the point of affirming non-Christian religions as well) while being very active in social issues like racism, social justice and more.
- Church Growth – also labeled as "Seeker Sensitive Movement" by its opponents, is a movement which aims to grow churches by appropriating their practices to what studies have shown people seek from a church.
- Emerging church – a response to the formation of Megachurches by the Seeker sensitive movement, it emphasizes the importance of a small and personal Christian community at the cost of doctrinal diversity.
- Young, Restless, Reformed movement – a response to the Seeker sensitive movement, the movement rejects the question "what people want from the church?" asking instead "what God wants from the church?". It represents a return to the theology of the Puritans which resulted in the adoption of Calvinist theology in historically non-Reformed churches.

== History of Protestantism ==
=== Pre-Reformation figures and movements ===
==== Patristic Age ====
- Aerius of Sebaste (Pontus, 4th century)
- Helvidius (4th century)
- Jovinian – (?–405)
- Vigilantius – (Gaul, c. 370– c. 406)
- Augustine of Hippo – (North Africa, 354–430)
- Prosper of Aquitaine – (Italy, 390–455)

==== Middle Ages ====
- Claudius of Turin – (Italy, ?–827)
- Gottschalk of Orbais – (Germany, ?–868)
- Ratramnus – (France, ?–868)
- Berengar of Tours – (France, ?–1088)
  - Berengarians – (France, 11th century)
- Peter of Bruys – (France, ?–1131)
  - Petrobrusians – (France, 12th century)
- Henry of Lausanne – (France, ?–1148)
- Arnold of Brescia – (Italy, 1090–1155)
  - Arnoldists – (Italy, 12th century)
- Peter Waldo – (France, 1140–1205)
  - Waldensians – (Italy, 12th century – present)
- Gregory of Rimini – (Italy, 1300–58)
- Thomas Bradwardine – (England, 1300–49)
- John Wycliffe – (England, 1320–84)
  - Lollards – (England, 14th – 16th century)
- Friends of God – (Germany, 14th century)
- Jan Hus – (Bohemia, ~1369–1415)
  - Bohemian Reformation – (Bohemia, 14th – 16th century)
  - Hussite Wars – (1420–~34)
  - Hussites – (15th century – present)
- Jerome of Prague – (Bohemia, 1379–1416)
- Jacob of Mies – (Bohemia, 1372–1429)

==== Renaissance ====
- Lorenzo Valla – (Italy, 1407–1457)
- Petr Chelčický – (Bohemia, 1390–1460)
- Johannes von Goch – (Germany, 1400–1475)
- Johann Ruchrat von Wesel – (Germany, ?–1481)
- Wessel Gansfort – (Netherlands, 1419–1489)
- Girolamo Savonarola – (Italy, 1452–1498)
  - Piagnoni – (Italy, 15th – 16th century)
- Jacques Lefèvre d'Étaples – (France, 1455–1536)
- Desiderius Erasmus – (Netherlands, 1466–1536)

=== The Protestant Reformation ===
- Martin Luther – One of the first Protestant reformers in the 16th century, the term Lutheran was coined when Catholics labelled like-minded people Lutherans following the practice of naming a heresy after its leader in an attempt to discredit it.
  - The Ninety-Five Theses (31 October 1517) – Martin Luther's list of complaints against the church.
  - Heidelberg Disputation (26 April 1518) –
  - Leipzig Debate (June and July 1519) –
  - Exsurge Domine (15 June 1520) – a papal bull condemning Martin Luther's theses.
  - Decet Romanum Pontificem (3 January 1521) – the official excommunication of Martin Luther from the Catholic Church.
  - Diet of Worms (28 January to 25 May 1521) –
  - Marburg Colloquy (1–4 October 1529) – a meeting between Martin Luther, Huldrych Zwingli and other leading reformers.
  - Augsburg Confession (25 June 1530) – the first confession of faith of the Lutheran tradition.
  - Wittenberg Concord (29 May 1536) – Some Calvinist churches accepted the Lutheran view of real presence in the Eucharist.
- German Peasants' War (1524 – 1525) – A peasants' rebellion in Germany.
- Schmalkaldic League –
- Calvin's Geneva (1541 – 1564) – A period of time when the Genevan Consistory exercised immense influence over Geneva.
- Consensus Tigurinus (1951) – A de facto merger of the Calvinist and Zwinglian factions of the reformation.
- Magisterial Reformation –
- Radical Reformation – a section of the reformation movement seeking radical reform in the Church; the Anabaptists are major adherents.
- Counter-Reformation – a series of reforms within the Catholic Church that occurred in response to the Protestant Reformation.

=== Reformation era movements ===
- Lutheranism – the Protestant movement which identified itself with the theology of Martin Luther.
- Calvinism – a Protestant theological system largely based on the teachings of John Calvin, a reformer.
- Anabaptism – a 16th-century movement which rejected infant baptism; Many consider Anabaptism to be a distinct movement from Protestantism. Amish, Hutterites, and Mennonites are descendants of this movement.
- Anglicanism – the multitude of doctrines and practices of the Church of England.
  - Nonconformism – the practice of refusing to adhere to the practices of the Church of England.
  - Dissenters – in this context, those who have separated themselves from the "Established Church" (Church of England).
  - Puritanism – Calvinist English Protestants who thought the Church of England was not truly reformed and sought to purify the Church from its remaining Roman Catholic practices.
- Polish Brethren – members of the Minor Reformed Church of Poland, a non-Trinitarian church in Poland (1565–1658).
- Remonstrants – Dutch Protestants adhering to the views of Arminius, in opposition to Calvinism.
- Counter-Reformation – a series of reforms within the Catholic Church that occurred in response to the Protestant Reformation.

=== Personalities of the era of the Reformation ===
==== Protestant reformers ====
===== Evangelical (Lutheran) =====
- Martin Luther (1483–1546) – church reformer, Father of Protestantism, theological works guided those now known as Lutherans.
- Philipp Melanchthon (1497–1560) – early Lutheran leader, colleague of Luther and author of the Augsburg Confession and its apology.
- Martin Chemnitz (1522–1586) – proeminent Lutheran leader, author of the Formula of Concord and editor of the Book of Concord.

===== Reformed (Calvinist) =====
- Huldrych Zwingli (1484–1531) – founder of the Swiss reformed tradition, reformation leader in Zürich.
- Johannes Oecolampadius (1482–1531) – reformation leader in Basel.
- Martin Bucer (1491–1551) – reformation leader in Strasbourg.
- William Farel (1489–1565) – reformation leader in Neuchâtel, Switzerland.
- Peter Martyr Vermigli (1499–1562) – Italian reformer.
- Heinrich Bullinger (1504–1575) – successor of Zwingli, leading reformed theologian, co-author of the Helvetic Confessions.
- John Calvin (1509–1564) – French theologian, reformation leader in Geneva, Switzerland, author of the famous work of systematic theology: Institutes of the Christian Religion and founder of the school of theology known as Calvinism.
- Zacharias Ursinus (1534–1583) – author of the Heidelberg Catechism.
- Guido de Bres (1522–1567) – student of John Calvin, author of the Belgic Confession.
- John Knox (1514–1572) – Scottish Calvinist reformer, founder of the Church of Scotland.
- Theodore Beza (1519–1605) – successor of Calvin, leading reformed theologian.
- Jacobus Arminius (1560–1609) – Dutch theologian, founder of the Remonstrant movement and the school of thought known as Arminianism.

===== Anglican =====
- William Tyndale (1494–1536) – English biblical scholar and linguist, author of the first English Bible translation to use the Hebrew and Greek texts as source.
- Thomas Cranmer (1489–1556) – Archbishop of Canterbury and leading reformer in England, author of the Forty-two Articles and the first and second versions of the Book of Common Prayer.
- Matthew Parker (1504–1575) – Archbishop of Canterbury, primary author of the final version of the Thirty-nine Articles.
- William Perkins (1558–1602) – Early Puritan leader.
- Richard Hooker (1554–1600) – English priest and theologian, credited with consolidating Anglican identity through his writings.

===== Anabaptist =====
- Andreas Karlstadt (1486–1541) – early friend and collaborator of Luther, former catholic priest and university professor, he grew unsatisfied with the extent of the reforms made by the Lutheran churches and started a new movement in Orlamünde. He was an iconoclast and a sabbatarian. He advocated for congregationalism, denied infant baptism (but didn't rebaptized those who were baptized as infants), and insisted on being called "Brother Andreas" instead of "Father Andreas".
- Thomas Müntzer (1489–1525) – early friend and collaborator of Luther, former catholic priest, he, along with the Zwickau prophets, separated themselves from the Lutheran churches and founded a Joachimit group in the city of Zwickau. The group's beliefs and actions would give rise to the German Peasants' War.
- Conrad Grebel (1498–1526) – early friend and collaborator of Zwingli, he co-founded the Swiss Brethren.
- Felix Manz (1498–1527) – early friend and collaborator of Zwingli, he co-founded the Swiss Brethren.
- Balthasar Hubmaier (1480–1528) – influential Anabaptist theologian, author of numerous works during his five years of ministry, tortured at Zwingli's behest, and executed in Vienna.
- Caspar Schwenckfeld (1490–1561) – he developed the idea of "celestial flesh" (that Jesus did not took his human nature from the Virgin Mary) which would subsequently be accepted by most Anabaptist groups.
- Melchior Hoffman (1495–1543) – former lutheran lay preacher, he converted to Anabaptism in 1530 and founded an Anabaptist community in Emden, gaining a large following. He was an apocalyptic preacher and believed Strasbourg to be the New Jerusalem where Jesus will return.
- Jan Matthys (1500–1534) – Anabaptist leader and disciple of Melchior Hoffman, his beliefs and actions would give rise to the Münster rebellion.
- Menno Simons (1496–1561) – founder of the Mennonites.

==== Non-Trinitarians ====
- Ludwig Haetzer (1500–1529) – Swiss Anabaptist theologian, nonadorantist, iconoclast and Bible translator.
- Michael Servetus (1511–1553) – Spanish physician and lay theologian, he is seen as the forerunner of the subsequent Non-trinitarian movements of the 16th century. Servetus held to a modified form or Arianism while denying the concept of divine "persons" in the Godhead for which he was condemned of heresy by both catholics and protestants and burned at the stake in 1553 in Calvin's Geneva.
- Lelio Sozzini (1525–1562) – Italian Protestant theologian and friend of Heinrich Bullinger, he will later start to question classic Protestant theology. Unlike previous non-trinitarians, he denied the Pre-existence of Christ starting a new non-trinitarian school of thought known as Socinianism.
- Bernardino Ochino (1487–1564) –
- Martin Cellarius (1499–1564) –
- Matteo Gribaldi (1505–1564) –
- Giovanni Valentino Gentile (1520–1566) –
- Piotr of Goniądz (1520s–1573) – prominent Polish pastor, he was excommunicated from the Major Reformed Church of Poland for his views and was a founder of the Minor Reformed Church of Poland (also known as the Polish Brethren), an arian and anabaptist denomination.
- Ferenc Dávid (1520–1579) – Initially a Lutheran pastor and later Bishop of the Hungarian Reformed Church, David will became one of the most influential Unitarian theologians of the 16th century, converting Prince John Sigismund Zápolya and founding the Unitarian Church of Transylvania of which he will also be its bishop. After Stephen Báthory became Voivode of Transylvania, his denial of the worship of Jesus will get him in trouble with the authorities and will be sentenced to life imprisonment.
- Giorgio Biandrata (1515–1588) – Italian physician and lay theologian, he was crucial in the promulgation of Non-trinitarian views in Transylvania by becoming the personal physician of Prince John Sigismund Zápolya and influencing Ferenc Dávid.
- Jacob Palaeologus (1520–1585) – well known nonadorantist Unitarian.
- Gregory Paul of Brzeziny (1525–1591) – Polish socinian theologian, a proponent of conscientious objection and christian mortalism.
- Symon Budny (1533–1593) – Polish-Belarusian Unitarian theologian and hebrew scholar, he denied the Pre-existence of Christ (like the socinians), but also denied the virgin birth and the invocation of Jesus in prayer which will later result in his excommunication from the Polish Brethren.
- Fausto Sozzini (1539–1604) – nephew and colleague of Lelio Sozzini, a prominent theologian and leader in the socinian tradition. He moved to Poland and greatly influenced the Polish Brethren promoting conscientious objection, the virgin birth and addressing Jesus in prayer and making it transition from Arianism to Socinianism.
- Marcin Czechowic (1532–1613) – Polish arian (later socinian) pastor, biblical translator and leader of the Polish Brethren. He opposed infant baptism but also the idea that people born to christian parents did not need baptism at all (the view of Fausto Sozzini). Because he wrote mostly in polish, he was not influential outside Poland.

==== Catholic opponents of the Reformation ====
- Desiderius Erasmus (1466–1536) – Dutch theologian and philosopher, agreed with many points of the reformation but disagreed with the reformers over the doctrine of free will and accused them of being schismatic, believing the Catholic Church must be reformed from within.
- Ignatius of Loyola (1491–1556) – founder of the Jesuit Order
- Luis de Molina (1535–1600) – founder of the school of thought known as Molinism to reconcile the doctrines of sovereignty of God and human free will.

==== Political figures ====
- Frederick III (1463–1525) – Elector of Saxony (1486–1525), protector of Martin Luther.
- Francis I (1494–1547) – king of France (1515–1547), a repressor of the Reformation.
- Charles V (1500–1558) – emperor of the Holy Roman Empire (1519–1556).
- Henry VIII (1491–1547) – king of England (1509–1547), founder of the Church of England.
- Edward VI (1537–1553) – king of England (1547–1553), significant reforms of the Church of England were implemented during his reign.
- Mary I (1516–1558) – queen of England (1553–1558), a great persecutor of Protestants.
- Elizabeth I (1533–1603) – queen of England (1558–1603), most reforms of the Church of England were implemented during her reign.

==== Popes ====
- Leo X (1513–1522)* – excommunicated Martin Luther from the Catholic Church.
- Adrian VI (1522–1523) –
- Clement VII (1523–1534) – refused the annulment of the marriage of King Henry VIII and Catherine of Aragon which resulted in the English Reformation and the break away of the Church of England.
- Paul III (1534–1549) – established the Roman Inquisition and convoked the Council of Trent.
- Julius III (1550–1555) –
- Marcellus II (1555) – confirmed Reginald Pole as Archbishop of Canterbury during the Counter-Reformation in England started by Queen Mary I.
- Paul IV (1555–1559) – introduced the Index Librorum Prohibitorum to suppress Protestant writings and also persecuted the Spirituali.
- Pius IV (1559–1565) –
- Pius V (1566–1572) –

*dates represent the time of papacy

=== The Great Awakenings ===
- First Great Awakening – (c. 1731–1755)
- Second Great Awakening – (c. 1790–1840)
- Third Great Awakening – (c. 1850–1900)
- Fourth Great Awakening – (c. 1960–1980)

== See also ==
- Outline of religion
