= Gabriel Biel =

German canon regular and scholar (1420s–1495)

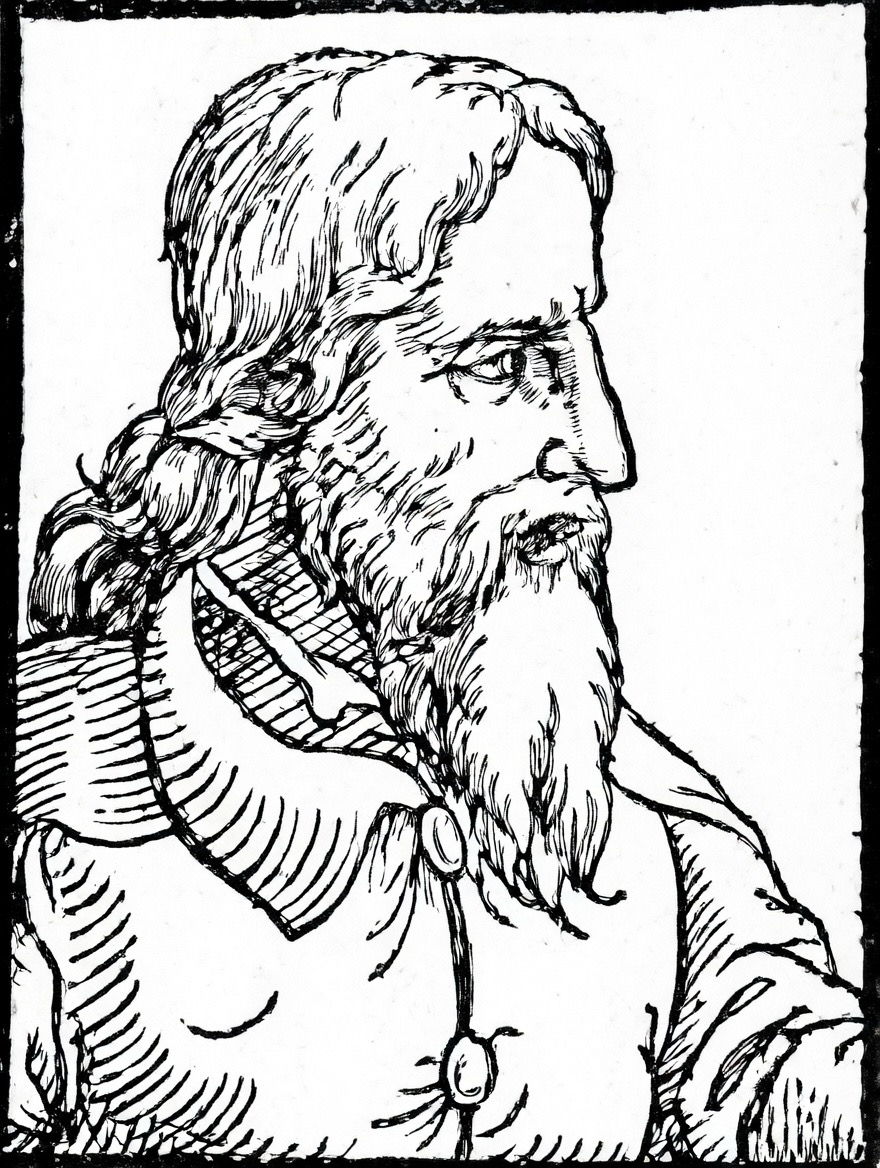
Wendelin Stambach, Supplementum commentarii, 1574

Gabriel Biel (German: [biːl]; 1420 to 1425 – 7 December 1495) was a German scholastic philosopher and member of the Canons Regular of the Congregation of Windesheim, who were the clerical counterpart to the Brethren of the Common Life. Because of his reliance on the scholastic tradition, as well as nominalist views, he is credited an "articulate spokesman of the via moderna and … a discerning user of the thought of via antiqua" (Oberman, 11). He has been called ultimus scholasticorum, the last of the schoolmen.

== Life ==
Biel was born in Speyer. In 1432 he was ordained to the priesthood and entered Heidelberg University to obtain a baccalaureate. He succeeded academically and became an instructor in the faculty of the arts for three years, until he pursued a higher degree at the University of Erfurt. His first stay was brief, lasting only until he transferred to the University of Cologne. He did not complete his degree there either, and would return to Erfurt in 1451 to finish. The curriculum at these two universities varied greatly, with Cologne stressing Thomas Aquinas and overall scholastic curricula heavily, and Erfurt emphasizing William of Ockham. During the early 1460s, he became a preacher in the Cathedral of Mainz, of which he was vicar.

While at Mainz, Biel wrote Defensorium obedientiae apostolicae, a treatise supporting in particular the right of Pope Pius II to decide appointments without appeal. This work involved him in the Mainz Diocesan Feud, and resulted in exile for a period at Kiedrich as a pastor.

Later, Biel became a superior of the canons at Butzbach. He lived in the House of the Brethren on the Rheingau until 1468. He was invited by Duke Eberhard I to become the first provost of the new Brethren House at St. Mark's, where he served for nine years, furthering the Brethren movement by bringing about a General Chapter of the Brethren on the upper Rhine in Mainz and integrating Brethren piety into the curricula of the school there. In 1479 he was appointed provost of the canonry in Urach.

At this period Biel cooperated with Duke Eberhard in the founding the University of Tübingen. Appointed in 1484 as the first professor of theology in the new faculty, he continued to be one of the most celebrated members of its faculty until his death, even serving as Rector in 1484 and 1489. There, he opposed the appointment of the Realist Johann Heynlin to the faculty.

Though he was almost sixty years of age when he began to teach, Biel's work, both as professor and as writer, reflected the highest honour on the young university. His work consists in the systematic development of the views of his master, William of Ockham. In later years, he was known as the "last of the Scholastics". He retired to the newly founded Brethren House of St. Peter's at the Einsiedel near Tübingen, where he died. and died in

== Works ==
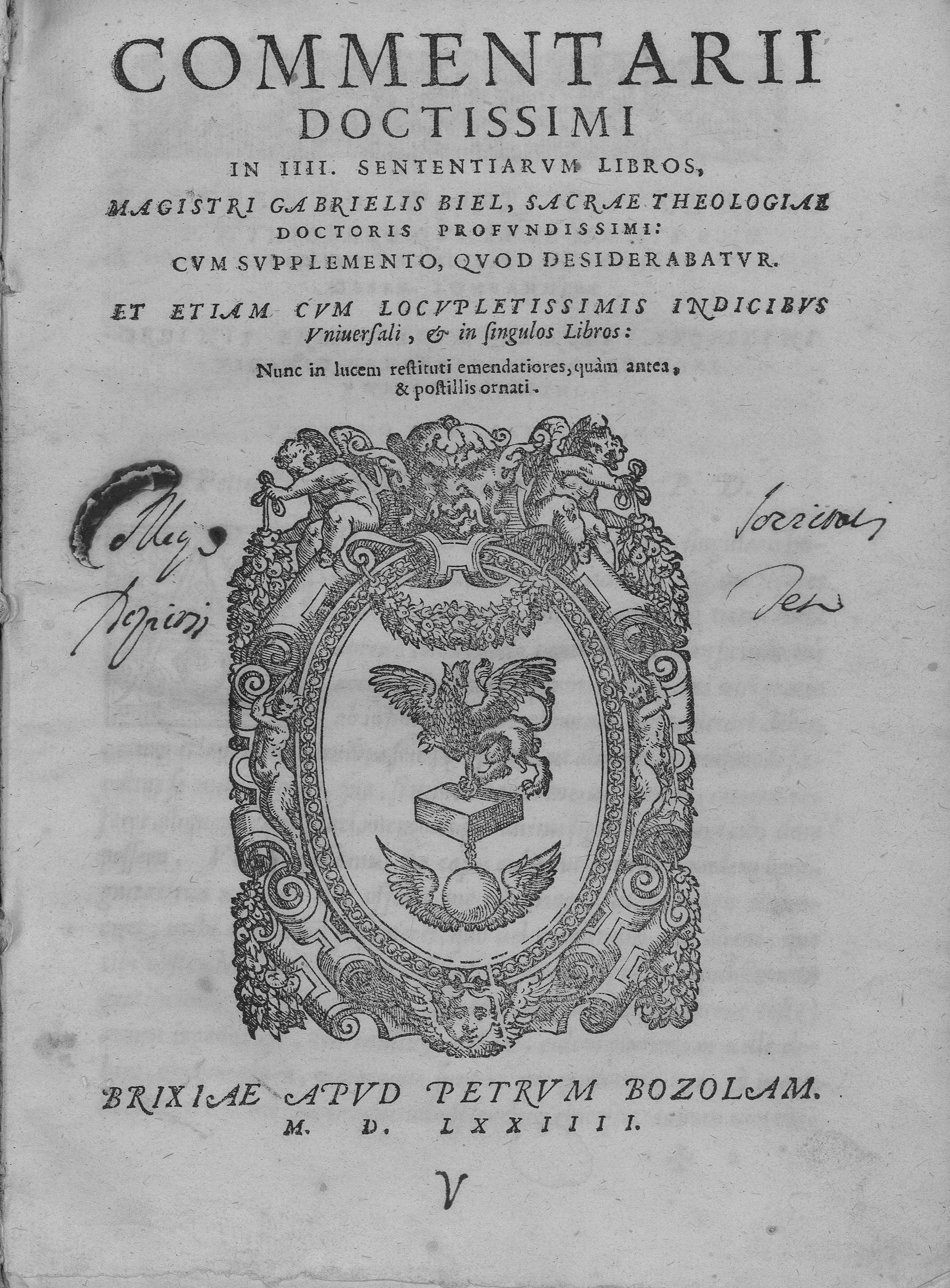
Commentarii doctissimi in 4. Sententiarum libros, 1574

Biel's first publication, on the Canon of the Mass, is of permanent interest and value. His second and most important work is a commentary on the Sentences of Peter Lombard, which would come to play a major influence on Martin Luther during the coming Reformation. In this he calls William of Ockham his master, but the last three books show him more Scotist than Nominalist. Matthias Scheeben describes him as "one of the best of the Nominalists, clear, exact, and more positive as well as more loyal to the Church than any of the others" (Dogmatik, no. 1073). The historian Johannes Janssen stated that he was a nominalist who erected a theological system without incurring the charge of unorthodoxy.Geschichte des deutschen Volkes, I, 127, 15th ed.</ref>

Biel, though a nominalist, was tolerant of Realism, which also flourished at Tübingen under the leadership of Konrad Summenhart. A scholastic, he was, to quote Janssen, "free from empty speculations and ingenious intellectual juggling, being concerned with questions and needs of actual life", was interested in the social movements of his time, and maintained friendly relations with the Humanists.Heinrich Bebel, gave him the title of "monarch among theologians". His theological writings were repeatedly brought into the discussions of the Council of Trent.

Living as he did in a transition period, Biel exhibits characteristics of two intellectual eras. According to some, he was a Scholastic who expounded Aristotle rather than the Scriptures; according to others, he defended freer theological teaching.

In May 1459, a controversy arose when Diether von Isenburg was elected as Archbishop of Mainz, yet failed to pay the required annates, and so, Adolph von Nassau was given the position. When Diether began appealing to antipapal sentiments present throughout the Holy Roman Empire, escalating the conflict, Biel became involved. He campaigned unequivocally for Adolph, and was forced to flee Mainz. While in hiding, he wrote the Defensorium obediente apostolice, an ecclesiastical treatise on the extent of papal authority (and the Church authority) and the role that scripture has on these. In it, he takes a position similar to Bernard of Clairvaux's plenitudo potestatis. As a matter of fact, he acknowledged the primacy and supreme power of the Roman Pontiff, but, in common with many other theologians of his time, maintained the superiority of general Councils, at least to the extent that they could compel the pope's resignation. And he displayed no more theological freedom than has been claimed and exercised by some of the strictest theologians.

Because of Biel's insistence on maintaining the precarious balancing act between his scholastic and modern views of theology, it is often the case that "His philosophical thought is not straightforwardly innovative, but has more of a synthetic nature; his generally recognized clarity of expression if often achieved by contrasting diverse positions with each other (Gracia, A Companion to Philosophy in the Middle Ages).

Among the opinions defended by Biel concerning matters controversial in his day, the following are worthy of mention: (a) That all ecclesiastical jurisdiction, even that of bishops, is derived either immediately or mediately from the pope. His defence of the episcopal claims of Adolph von Nassau won him the thanks of Pope Pius II. (b) That the power of absolving is inherent in sacerdotal orders, and that only the matter, i.e., the persons to be absolved, can be conceded or withheld by the ordinary. (c) That the minister of baptism need have no more specific intention than that of doing what the faithful, that is, the Church, intends. (d) That the State may not compel Jews, or heathens, or their children to receive baptism. (e) And that the contractum trinius is morally lawful. All of these opinions have since become the prevailing theological doctrine.

Biel's other works include: Sacri canonis Missae expositio resolutissima literalis et mystica (Brixen, 1576); an abridgment of this work, entitled Epitome expositionis canonis Missae (Antwerp, 1565); Sermones (Brixen, 1585), on the Sundays and festivals of the Christian year, with a disquisition on the plague and a defence of the authority of the pope; Collectorium sive epitome in magistri sententiarum libros IV (Brixen, 1574); and Tractatus de potestate et utilitate monetarum.

== Economic thought ==
The subject on which Biel held the most progressive views is political economy. Wilhelm Roscher, who with Gustav Schmoller introduced him to modern students of economics, declares that Biel's grasp of economics enabled him not only to understand the work of his predecessors, but to advance beyond them. (Cf. Geschichte der Nationalökonomik in Deutschland, 21 sqq.) According to Biel, the just price of a commodity is determined chiefly by human needs, by its scarcity, and by the difficulty of producing it.

Biel's enumeration includes all the factors that govern market price, and is more complete and reasonable than any made by his predecessors. (Cf. Garnier, L'idée du just prix, 77.) The same author maintains that concerning the occupation of the merchant or trader, Biel is more advanced than St. Thomas, since he attaches no stigma to it, but holds it to be good in itself, and the merchant entitled to remuneration because of his labour, risks, and expense. Biel's discussion of these subjects is contained in Book IV of his commentary on the Sentences. He wrote a special work on currency, Ein wahrhaft goldenes Buch, in which he stigmatizes the debasing of coinage by princes as dishonest exploitation of the people. In the same work he severely condemns those rulers who curtailed the popular rights of forest, meadow, and water, and who imposed arbitrary burdens of taxation, as well as the rich sportsmen who encroached upon the lands of the peasantry.

== Legacy ==
In Biel's Expositio Canonis Missae, he expressed a version of the phrase "You get what you pay for": Pro tali numismate tales merces.

== Works ==
- Gabriel Biel, Sacri canonis Missae expositio resolutissima literalis et mystica, Brixen, 1576.
- Gabriel Biel, Epitome expositionis canonis Missae, Antwerp, 1565.
- Gabriel Biel, Gabrielis Biel Canonis Misse Expositio, edited by Heiko Oberman and William J. Courtenay, Wiesbaden: Franz Steiner, 1965-1967.
- Gabriel Biel, Sermones, Brixen, 1585.
- Gabriel Biel, Collectorium sive epitome in magistri sententiarum libros IV, Brixen, 1574.
- Gabriel Biel, Tractatvs varii atqve vtilis de monetis, carvmqve mvtatione ac falsitate in gratiam studiosorum ac practicorum collecti, Cologne: Theodorus Baumius, 1574.
- Gabriel Biel, Treatise on the power and utility of moneys, translated by Robert Belle Burke, Philadelphia: University of Pennsylvania Press, and London: Oxford University Press, 1930.
- Gabriel Biel, Defensorium Obedientiae Apostolicae et Alia Documenta, edited and translated by Heiko Oberman, Daniel E. Zerfoss, and William J. Courtenay, Cambridge, MA: Belknap Press of Harvard University Press, 1968.

== See also ==
- Bartholomaeus Arnoldi von Usingen
- Johann Eck
- Wessel Gansfort
- Johannes von Goch
- Juan de Mariana
- Johann Ruchrat von Wesel
- Paulus Scriptoris
