= Andreas Dudith =

Hungarian nobleman and bishop

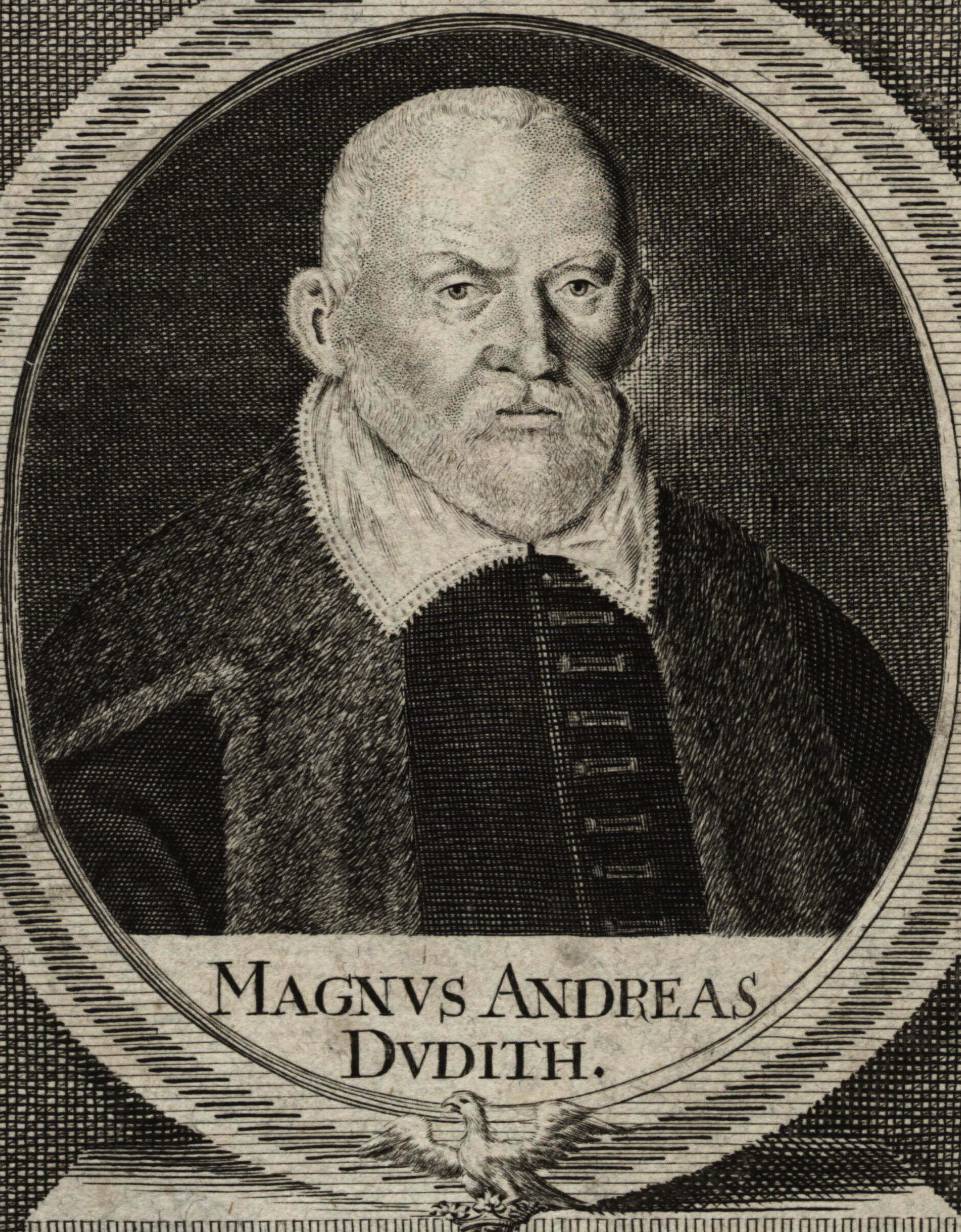
- Born: 1533; Buda, Kingdom of Hungary
- Died: 1589 (aged 55–56); Wrocław, Silesia, Kingdom of Bohemia
- Occupation: Diplomat

Andreas Dudith (Croatian: Andrija Dudić Orehovički), also András Dudith de Horahovicza (February 5, 1533 – February 22, 1589), was a Hungarian nobleman of Croatian and Italian origin, Catholic bishop, humanist and diplomat in the Kingdom of Hungary.

== Biography ==
Dudith was born in Buda, capital city of the Kingdom of Hungary to a Hungarian noble family with Croatian origins. His father, Jeromos Dudits, was a Croatian and his mother was an Italian. He studied in Wrocław, Italy, Vienna, Brussels and Paris.

In 1560 King Ferdinand I appointed him bishop of Knin, Croatia. He then participated in the Council of Trent (1545–1563) where, to comply with the wish of Ferdinand, he urged that the Chalice be given to the laity. Being appointed bishop of Pécs, Dudith went to Poland in 1565 as ambassador of Maximilian, where he married, and resigned his see, becoming an adherent of Protestantism. In Poland he began to sympathize with Socinian Anti-trinitarianism (the so-called Ecclesia Minor). Although he never declared himself officially a Unitarian, some researchers label him as an Anti-trinitarian thinker.

After the election of Stephen Báthory as king of Poland, Dudith left Kraków and went to Wrocław and later to Moravia, where he supported the Bohemian Brothers.

Dudith maintained a correspondence with famous Anti-trinitarians such as Giorgio Blandrata, Jacob Paleologus and Fausto Sozzini. Mihály Balázs, an expert on Central-European Anti-trinitarianism, affirms that Paleologus in Kraków lived in Dudith's house and left there to go to Transylvania. The theories of Blandrata, Sozzini and Ferenc Dávid had a great influence on him. Nevertheless he always remained an Erasmian humanist, who condemned religious intolerance whether from Protestants or Catholics.

Dudith died in 1589 in Wrocław and was buried in the Saint-Elizabeth Lutheran Church.
