= Pupper =

Pupper may refer to:

- Johann Pupper a.k.a. Johannes von Goch, a monk and theologian of the 1400s, thought by some to be a precursor of the Reformation.
- A word for dog in DoggoLingo
