= Magisterial =

Magisterial may refer to:

- pertaining to magistrate, a civilian officer who administers the law
- pertaining to magisterium, the church's authority to give authentic interpretation of the word of God
- Magisterial Protestantism, those Protestant denominations that believe in interdependence of church and state (particularly Lutheranism, Calvinism and Anglicanism)
