= Nonadorantism =

Christological position

Nonadorantism (from Latin adoro or adoratio ≈ worship) is a Christological position, that denied the validity of addressing Jesus in prayer. Nonadorantist theology was especially common in the Unitarian movement in the 16th century, and particularly represented by Ferenc Dávid and Jacob Palaeologus.

Also James Freeman represented nonadorantist positions.

== See also ==
- Jacob Palaeologus
