= Sum of Christianity =

1521 collection of Wessel Gansfort's works

The Sum of Christianity or Farrago Rerum Theologicarum, is a collection of Wessel Gansfort's writings published at Zwolle, probably in 1521. It was reprinted at Wittenberg and Basel in 1522, with the Basel edition containing a preface by Martin Luther.

In 1521, Martin Luther published a collection of Wessel's writings which had been preserved as relics by his friends, and said that if he (Luther) had written nothing before he read them, people might well have thought that he had stolen all his ideas from them. McClintock and Strong's Cyclopedia describes Gansfort as "the most important among men of German extraction who helped prepare the way for the Reformation."

Sum of Christianity was translated into English in 1536.
