= Wendelin Stambach =

German theologian

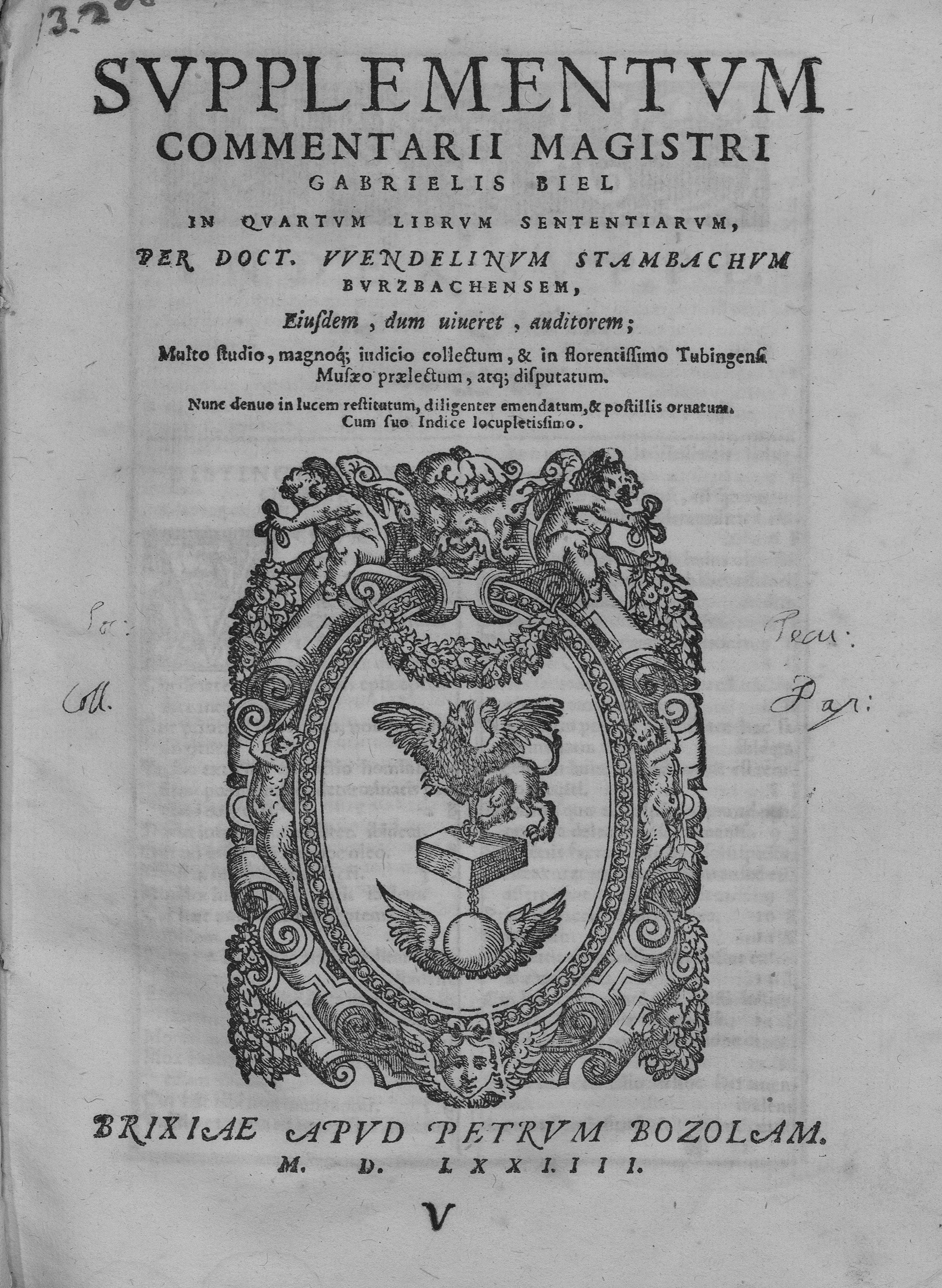
- Born: 1454; Butzbach
- Died: 14 January 1519 (aged 64–65); Tübingen
- Alma mater: University of Tübingen
- Occupation: Theologian

Wendelin Stambach (1454 – 14 January 1519) was a German theologian. Professor at the University of Tübingen in 1489, he was later elected rector. He edited the publication of Gabriel Biel's writings.

== Works ==
- Supplementum commentarii magistri Gabrielis Biel in quartum librum sententiarum (in Latin). Brescia: Pietro Bozzola & Vincenzo Sabbio. 1574.
