= Jacob Palaeologus =

Dominican friar who became an anti-Trinitarian

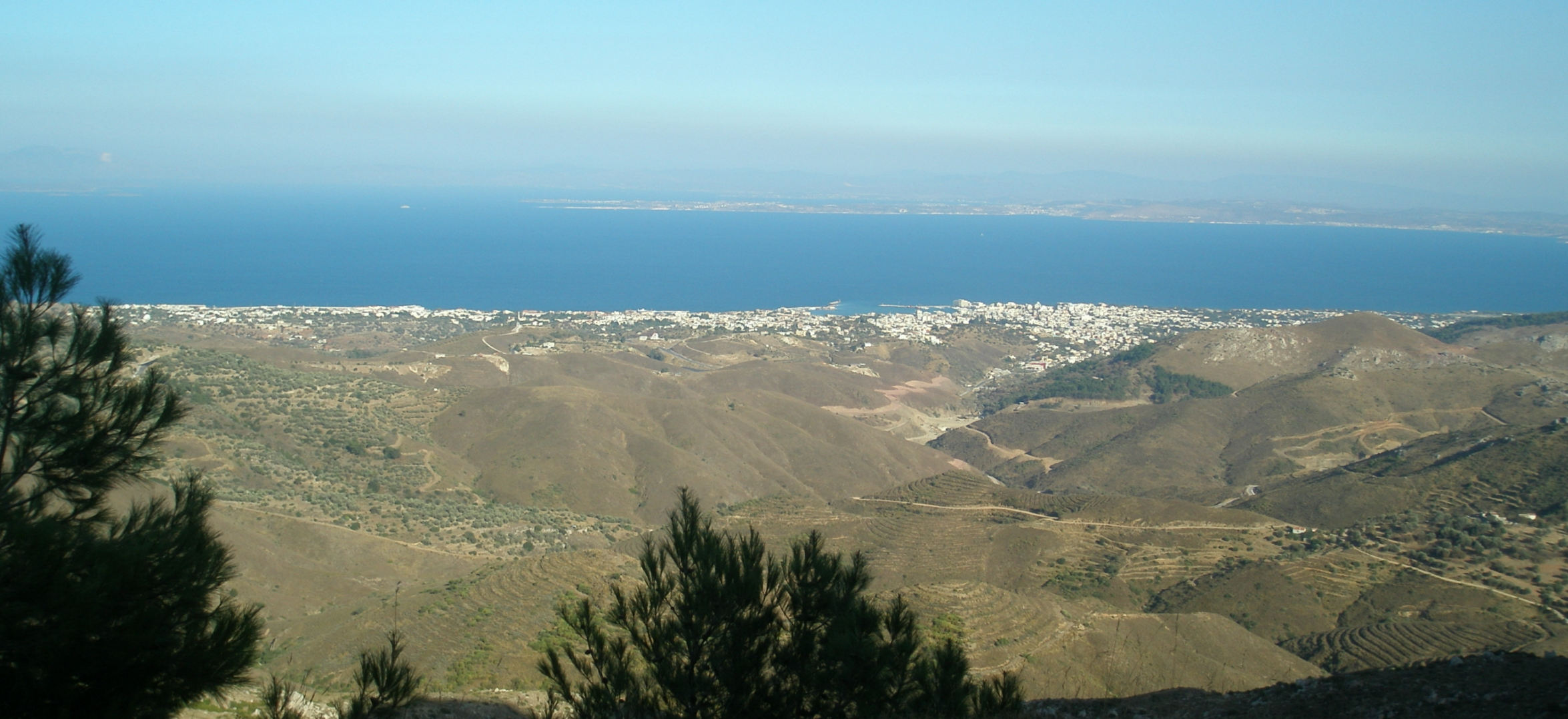
- Chios, birthplace of Jacob Palaelogus
- Born: c 1520; Chios, Republic of Genoa
- Died: March 23, 1585; Rome, Papal States
- Occupations: Reformer, theologian, controversialist
- Notable work: Disputatio Scholastica, Catechesis Christiana
- Theological work
- Notable ideas: nonadorantism, religious toleration

Jacob Palaeologus, also called Giacomo da Chio (c. 1520 – March 23, 1585), was a Dominican friar who renounced his religious vows and became an antitrinitarian theologian. A polemicist against both Calvinism and Papal Power, Palaeologus cultivated a wide range of high-placed contacts and correspondents in the imperial, royal, and aristocratic households in Eastern Europe and the Ottoman Empire; while formulating and propagating a radically heterodox version of Christianity, in which Jesus Christ was not to be invoked in worship, and where differences between Christianity, Islam, and Judaism were rejected as spurious fabrications. He was continually pursued by his many enemies, repeatedly escaping through his many covert supporters.

Palaeologus played an active role in the high politics of European religion and diplomacy over a period of twenty years before he lost imperial favour; and having been extradited to the Papal States, was executed for heresy by the Roman Inquisition.

== Life ==
Palaeologus was born at the Genoese colony on Chios, one of the Aegean Islands near the coast of Anatolia, of a Greek father and an Italian mother. Chios had been, since 1347, ruled by the Republic of Genoa and by the 16th century it was a fief of the Giustiniani family. The young man attached himself to Vincenzo Giustiniani (later Master General of the Dominican Order) and entered into the Dominican Order. He was educated in Dominican schools at Genoa and Ferrara, and later at the University of Bologna. He adopted the name "Jacob Palaeologus" and claimed kinship with the former Palaiologos emperors of Byzantium. Although in later life he repeatedly defended this claim, no independent sources survive that support it.

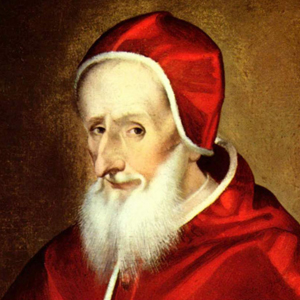
The Grand Inquisitor, Michele Ghislieri (later Pope Pius V); condemned Palaeologus to death in absentia, and remained his lifelong enemy

By 1554, Palaeologus was back east in the Dominican convent of St Peter in Pera, the Latin Christian quarter of Constantinople, and it was here that he developed a lifelong adherence to antitrinitarian teachings of Michael Servetus, and composed a defence of Servetus' doctrines against their denunciation by John Calvin; in consequence of which Servetus had been condemned to death in Geneva in 1553. In 1556 Palaeologus returned to Chios and actively supported the secular Genoese commissioners and the agents of the Holy Roman Emperor against the authority of the bishop of Chios; this led to his being denounced to the Inquisition and arrested in Genoa in 1557. In 1558, he escaped to Constantinople, but was rearrested in Ragusa (Dubrovnik) and brought to the prison of the Roman Inquisition under the personal investigation of the Grand Inquisitor, Michele Ghislieri (a fellow Dominican friar, later Pope Pius V). For the rest of his life, Palaeologus maintained a fierce opposition to the Inquisition, and a particular enmity for Ghislieri.

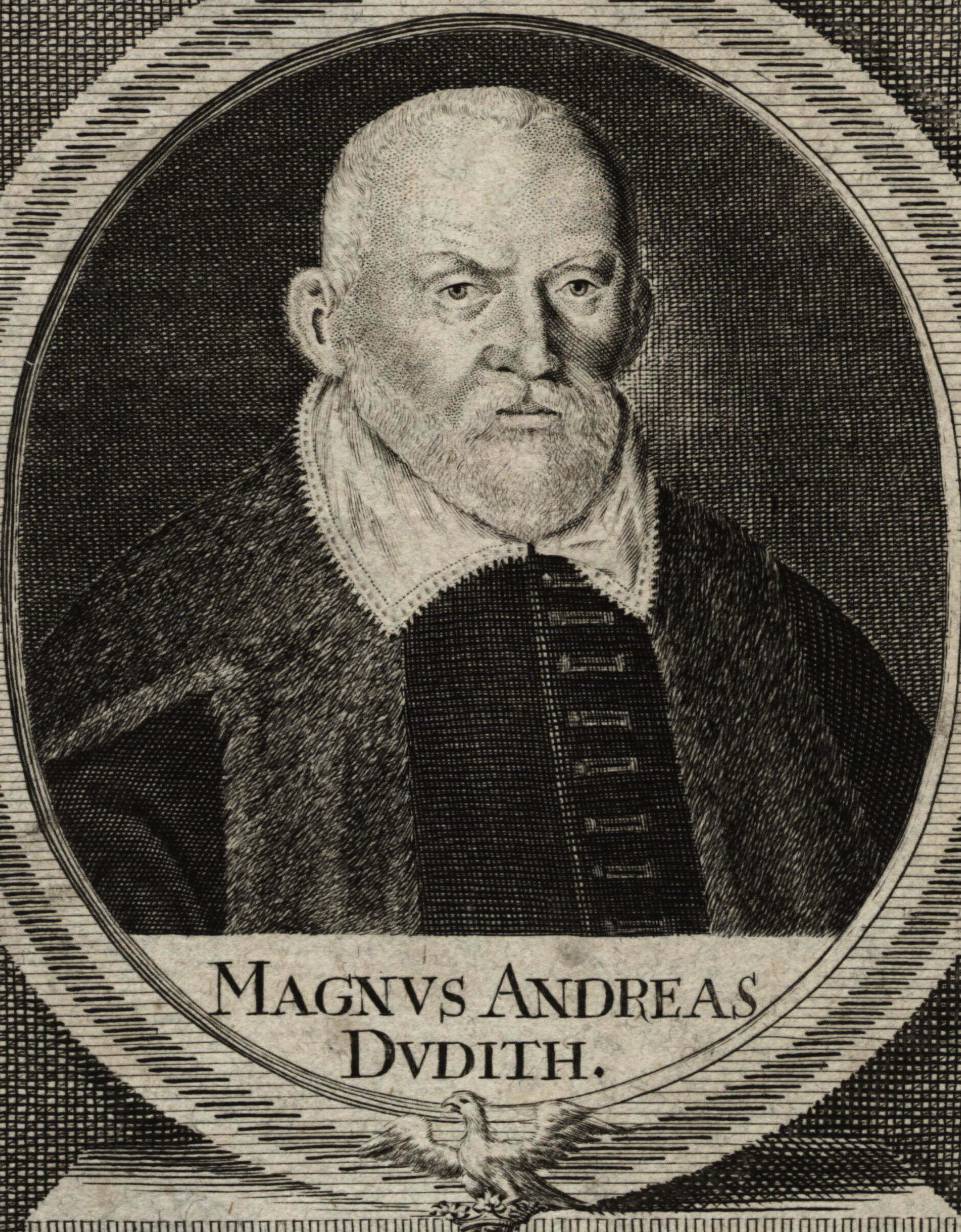
Andreas Dudith, protected Palaeologus and employed his scholarship in support of the imperial arguments presented to the Council of Trent

At the death of Pope Paul IV in 1559, the Roman mob looted buildings and burned records. Palaeologus escaped from prison when a mob stormed the headquarters of the Roman Inquisition and released inmates. Although evidence against him had been destroyed, he was subsequently tried in absentia by a Roman Inquisition tribunal, convicted, sentenced to death in 1561, and burned in effigy. Palaeologus escaped initially to France, where, in 1562, he unsuccessfully petitioned Cardinal Ippolito d'Este, the papal legate, to have the Inquisition heresy conviction overturned. Then later in 1562, realising that he was also not safe or welcome among Reformed Protestants because of his virulent denunciations of Calvinism, he offered help to Andreas Dudith, Bishop of Knin and the imperial representative at the Council of Trent. Palaeologus advised Dudith in the presentation to the Council of the imperial arguments for permitting communion under both kinds; and in exchange Dudith attempted to have Palaeologus's heresy conviction overturned by the Ecumenical Council, stirring up in the process a major disruption to the Council's proceedings. Eventually in 1563, Palaeologus was granted imperial asylum in Prague; and when the new Emperor Maximilian II succeeded in 1564, Palaeologus advanced in the imperial favour. Following the example of his patron Dudith, Palaeologus renounced his religious vows, marrying the daughter of a leading Prague reformer. In 1569, Palaeologus was proposed to the emperor as the Utraquist candidate to the office of Archbishop of Prague. This was however blocked by Ghislieri, his sworn enemy, who was now pope; and who eventually had Palaeologus expelled from the imperial dominions to Poland in 1571, where he was reunited in Kraków with Dudith, who was now the imperial representative to the Kingdom of Poland. Palaeologus was openly advancing antitrinitarian views but became embroiled in a bitter controversy with Gregory Paul of Brzeziny and the Ecclesia Minor over the Polish antitrinitarians' condemnation of Christian service in the military.

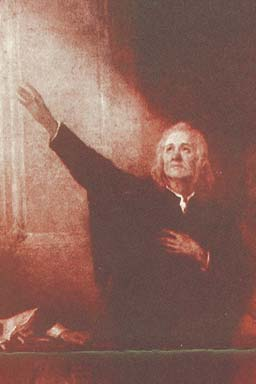
Ferenc Dávid, leader of the Unitarian Church of Transylvania; imprisoned, he was defended by Palaeologus in a succession of works.

Having acquired enemies in Catholic Rome, Calvinist Geneva, and Anti-Trinitarian Raków in Lesser Poland; Palaeologus sought in 1573 a more congenial home in the Unitarian Church of Transylvania, whose Unitarian status had been established under the rule of Prince John II Sigismund Zápolya. Bishop Ferenc Dávid had corresponded with him since 1570 and sought his advice. By 1573 this was a well-worn path for Italian reformers and radicals; already taken, amongst many others by Giorgio Biandrata and Francesco Stancaro, and Paleologus found a receptive audience for his teachings. The aristocratic households of Hungary, Principality of Transylvania and Polish–Lithuanian Commonwealth prized Italian culture and language, and most had sent their sons to Italian universities. Within their own extensive feudal estates they exercised substantial religious freedom – beyond the reach of Catholic bishops, Reformed city councils or the Inquisition – and many were sympathetic to radical Protestant ideas. Numbers of Italian religious exiles found ready employment in these places as physicians, chaplains, tutors, secretaries, and political agents. During 1573, Palaeologus undertook an extended trip to Constantinople and Chios (which had been captured by the Ottoman Empire from the Genoese Republic in 1566) – intended in part to impress Maximilian with his value and contacts – and then became Rector of the Unitarian college at Kolozsvár (Cluj) and the leading theoretician of nonadorantism, the strain of radical Protestantism that denied the validity of addressing Jesus in prayer. Following Zápolya's death in 1571, the succession to the Principality of Transylvania had been disputed. Palaeologus supported Gaspar Bekes, the pro-imperial and antitrinitarian candidate, against Stephen Báthory, the Catholic candidate. Following two failed uprisings, Bekes conceded defeat in 1575 and Palaeologus moved to Kraków where he promoted the cause of Maximilian, against that of Stephen Báthory in the 1576 Royal election in Poland; and then settling in Moravia. Meanwhile, Dávid was accused of religious innovation and deposed as leader of the Transylvanian Unitarian Church for his nonadorant practices. He died in prison in 1579. Palaeologus wrote polemical works supporting Dávid and attacking Fausto Sozzini for siding against Dávid.

Maximilan II died in 1576, and the new emperor Rudolph II was much less sympathetic, becoming convinced that Palaeologus was spying for the Ottoman Empire and possibly Poland too. Palaeologus was arrested by the Bishop of Olomouc in December 1581. Although the spying accusations could not be substantiated, a large body of heretical writings was found with him and he was extradited to Rome in May 1582.

On February 19, 1583, Palaeologus was taken to be burned at the stake but abjured at the sight of a Portuguese Marani being burnt alive and was permitted to return to his cell. The College of Cardinals argued for his death, but Pope Gregory XIII insisted that if Palaeologus would denounce his former antitrinitarian opinions then he would be more useful alive. Although Palaeologus was now reconciled with the Catholic Church, he still refused to cooperate with Gregory's plan and was beheaded on March 23, 1585.

A wide variety of radical groups emerged from the 16th century Reformation, commonly characterised by

- a rejection of clerical authority
- a rejection of the sacraments as essential instruments of God's Grace
- a rejection of the orthodox formulations of the Trinity

These groups were commonly dismissed by their opponents as Anabaptists (although by no means all practiced believer's baptism), a term that carried an implication of low social standing, limited education, excessive religious behaviour and the rejection of social and gender norms. Palaeologus conformed to none of these stereotypes. His command of biblical texts was at least the equal of that of the best of his antagonists, his knowledge of patristics probably better than any. He was formidably skilled in academic debate and wrote eloquently in high Latin style. Moreover, he was a strong critic of all forms of social subversion; and with his education from the University of Bologna, he was readily at ease in the Italian-speaking and Italian-educated aristocratic houses of central and eastern Europe. Even amongst those who did not share his vision of radical Christianity there were many, like Giustiniani and Dudith, who sympathised with his pleas for toleration; and his eloquent defence of free religious expression and debate in a Europe increasingly policed into tight bounds of conformity on one side or another. With the aid of his many contacts and correspondents, he appeared able to travel at will across the boundaries dividing Catholic from Reformed, and Christian from Turk. All of which made him a dangerous man, and explains the extensive, determined and persistent efforts of his opponents to have him silenced.

== Works ==
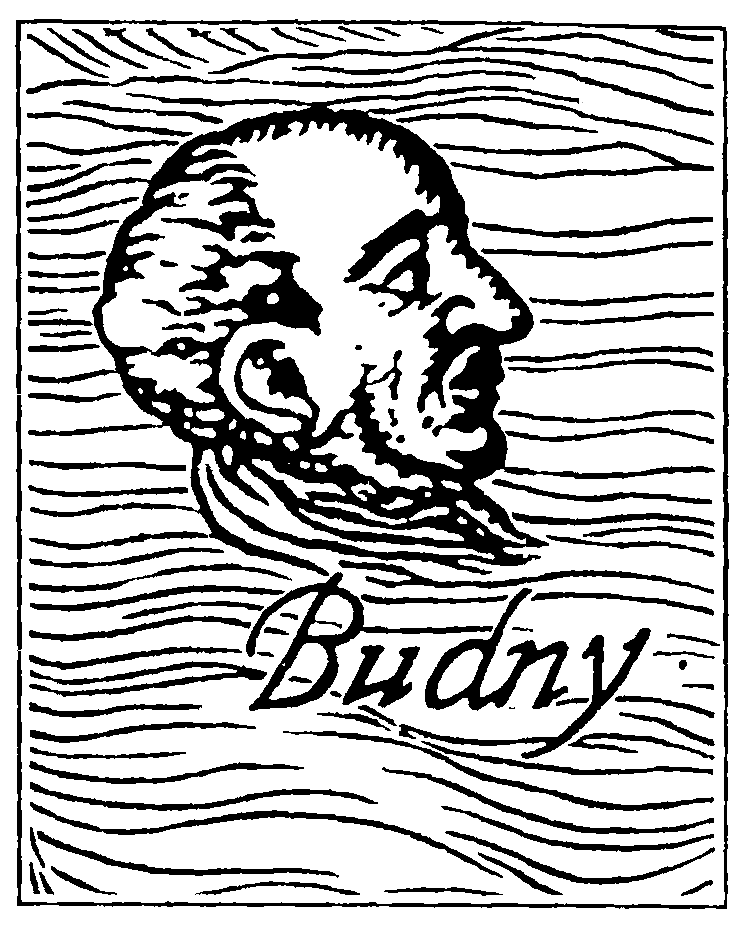
Symon Budny, collaborated with Palaeologus in developing the theology of non-adorantism, and published his works

Until 1571, Palaeologus claimed to be an Erasmian humanist, critical of the excesses of Papal Authority and of the Inquisition and sympathetic to some of the ideas of the Reformers, but still a faithful Catholic. All scholars agree, however, that Palaeologus' radical views in his subsequent published work are more representative of his earlier private opinions; and that he may well have become covertly convinced by antitrinitarian arguments as early as his stay in Pera in 1554–1555. It would accordingly have been unwise for him to publish much of his true opinions until moving to the Principality of Transylvania. However, following Zápolya's death in 1571, permission for Palaeologus, a foreigner, to print antitrinitarian works in the Principality of Transylvania was difficult to obtain; and most of his works of this period circulated in manuscript copies made by his students. From 1573 Dávid attempted to circumvent increasing restrictions on printing in the Principality of Transylvania by seeking to establish a printing press for radical Protestant works, dispatching Adam Neuser to Constantinople with funds for the project; and it is possible that Palaeologus's trip to Constantinople that year may have been partly related to this abortive project, as Palaeologus spent several days with Neuser there.

It was only after 1578 that Symon Budny, who shared both Palaeologus' nonadorantist theology and his criticisms of the pacifism of the Polish Ecclesia Minor, established a printing press in Belarus and many of Palaeologus' works, often in anonymous editions, were printed there from 1580 onwards.

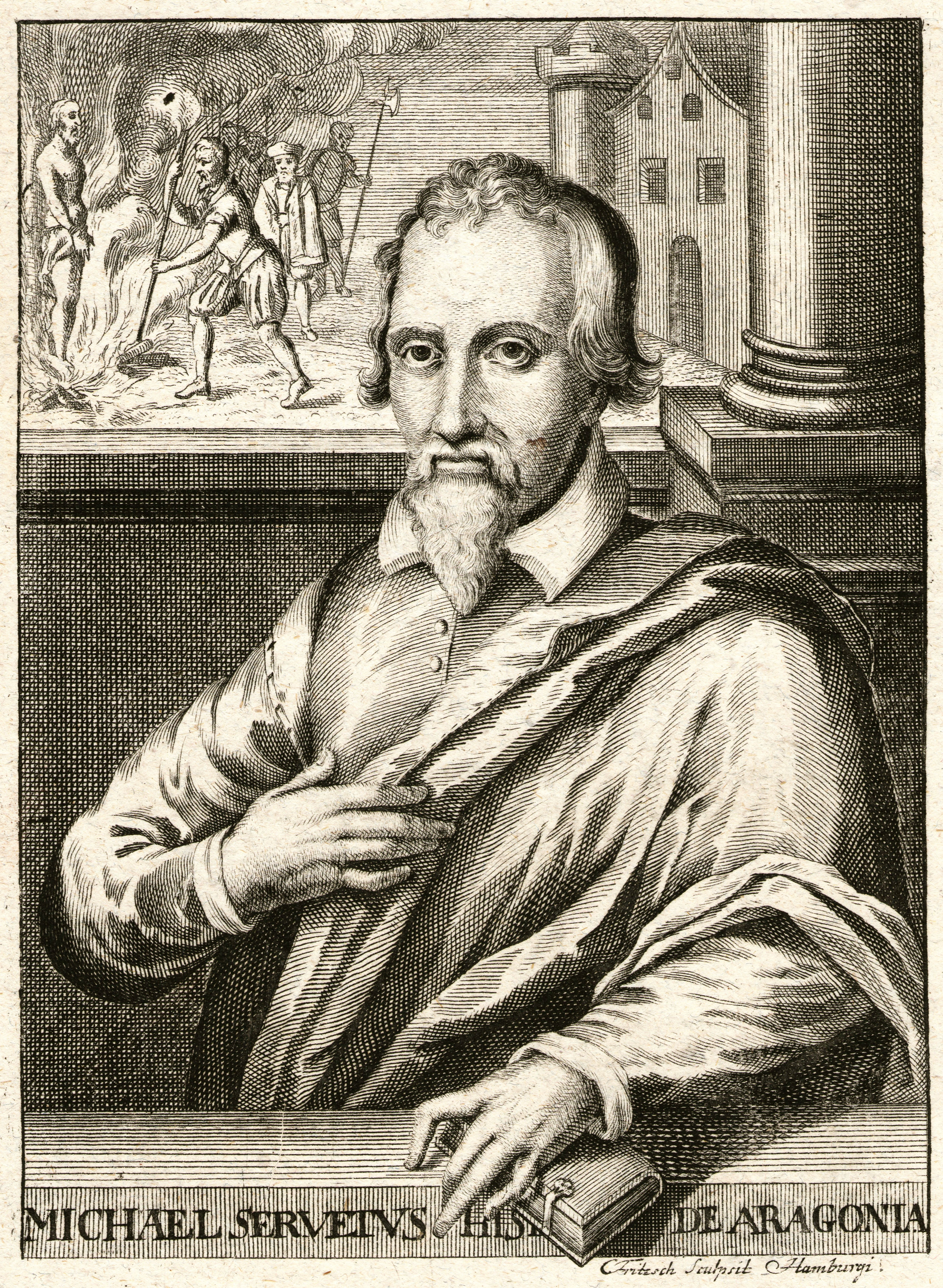
Michael Servetus, executed in Geneva in 1553, his antitrinitarian writings were the formative influence of Palaeologus' theology

- Contra Calvinum pro Serveto

On Palaeologus' arrest, a large body of theological writings, by him and others, fell into the hands of the Roman Inquisition. Some of these works are not known from the Unitarian archives preserved in Cluj and Kraków; and selected extracts were published by the Vatican Library in the late 19th century. They propose a defence of Michael Servetus, and are believed to date from the 1550s.

- De peccato originis
- De providentia

Two treatises written around 1569 in the form of open letters to Pope Pius V (Ghislieri); but intended for the Emperor Maximilian II. They criticise Calvinist teachings on predestination and original sin, also accusing the Inquisition of groundless persecution in its accusations and judgements against Palaeologus.

- Adversus proscriptionem Elisabethae Reginae Angliae, is a comprehensive scholarly refutation of the bull Regnans in Excelsis by which Pius V had excommunicated Elizabeth I of England in 1570.
- De discriminate Veteris et Novi Testamentum (1572), is Palaeologus' argument supporting the absolute continuity and consistency of the Old and New Testaments. Key to this is his rejection of the standard Christian identification of Jesus Christ as the Messiah, with Jesus Christ as the incarnate Son of God. Palaeologus expressed this as a formula of faith: "God is one and Jesus is the Anointed" a deliberate reworking of the Islamic shahada formula. For Palaeologus, the incarnation is a fabrication of the Church, unfounded and unscriptural. Jesus in his earthly ministry had been only and completely the true Messiah of Israel, and as such fulfilled in all respects the messianic prophecies of the Mosaic Law; which accordingly remains (for the Jewish people at least) in full force; only requiring their recognition of Jesus as Messiah. The resurrected Jesus was now with Almighty God, and would return as a universal deliverer to preside over the rule of the saints. Palaeologus appeared to believe that the historic coming of the Jesus as Messiah necessarily abrogated the sacrificial priesthood of the Old Testament; nevertheless his understanding of the historic Jesus entirely as a Jewish figure led to accusations of Judaizing from his opponents.
- De Tribus gentibus (1572), sets out Palaeologus' views on Judaism, Christianity and Islam; presenting three religious tribes who each are capable of providing an equal access to salvation; as each transmit to their members, within their respective scriptures, God's saving grace of divine revelation (albeit that the interpretation of this revelation has, in all three traditions, been corrupted by a clerical elite). The three true tribes being: Jews following the Mosaic Law who accept Jesus as Messiah (in which category Palaeologus also includes Coptic, Syrian and Ethiopic Christians); antitrinitarian Christians; and Muslims who recognise Jesus as a prophet. The treatise concludes with an eloquent defence of religious toleration.
- Dissolutio de sacramentis
- De Eucharistia
- De Baptismo
- De resurrectione mortuorum (1572)

These four treatises refute the claim of Christian churches to have unique access to salvation through participation in the benefits of the atoning death and resurrection of Christ; by baptism and by the sacrament of the Eucharist. For Palaeologus, there is no need for specific rites of atonement, and no essential ceremonies as instruments of salvation. Salvation requires only a free, pure and unqualified acceptance of God's offer of divine Grace; an acceptance that is only possible, in Palaeologus teaching, within the fellowship of a faithful community of believers where the revealed scriptures are regularly heard and shared.

- De bello sententia, is a refutation of the pacifism of Gregory Paul and the Polish Brethren.

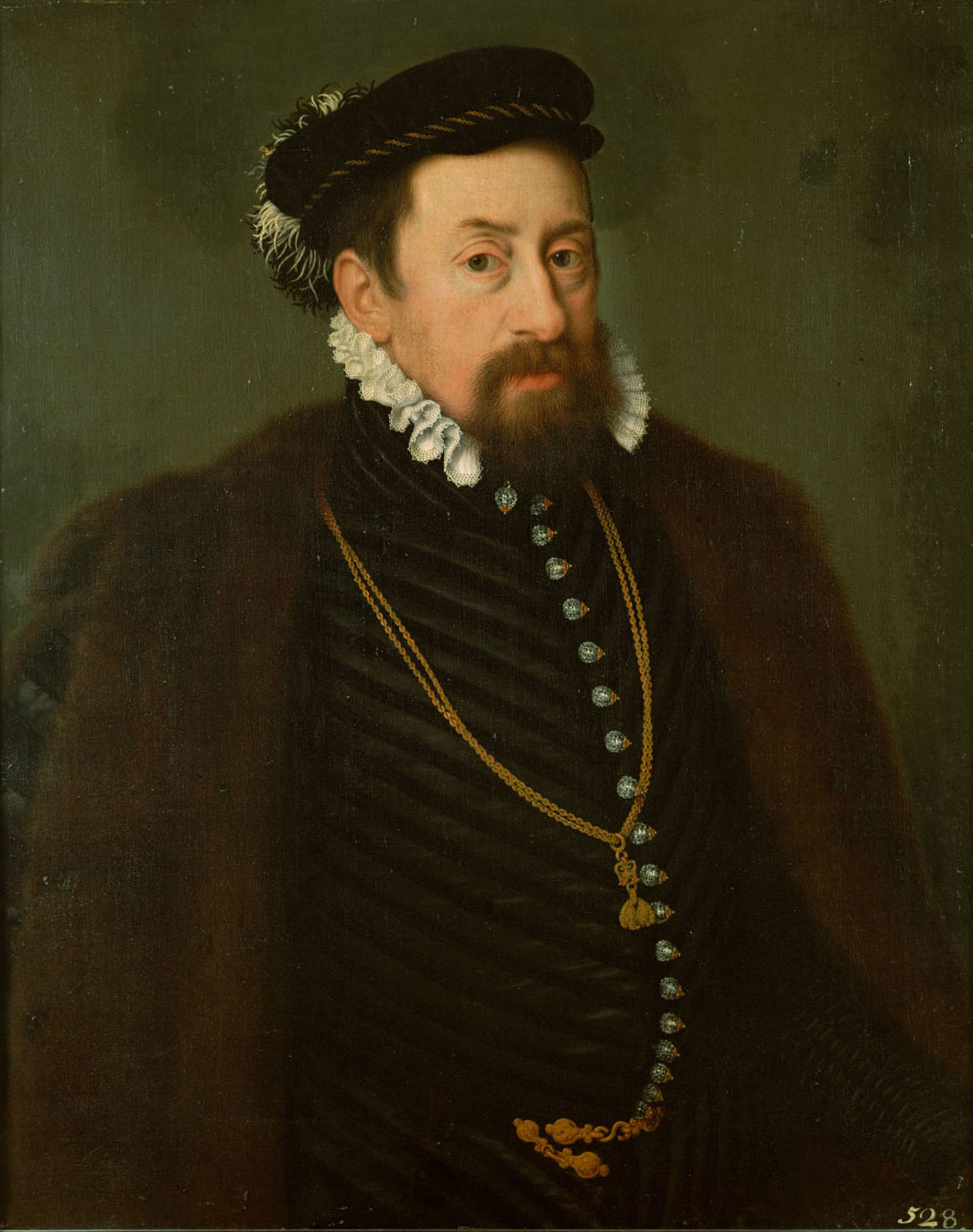
Maximillian II, Holy Roman Emperor, was Palaeologus' ultimate patron and protector, and the intended audience for many of his works

- Epistola de rebus Chii et Constantinopoli cum eo actis lectu digna, is an open letter to one of his friends, but intended for the Maximilian II. It describes Palaeologus' trip to Constantinople and Chios in the spring of 1573, name-dropping numerous high-ranking officials and notable figures who had received him.
- Catechesis Christiana dierum duodecim (1574), is Palaeologus' most complete systematic statement of antitrinitarian belief, published in Kolosvar, this draws extensively on the six unpublished treatises. It is structured within a satirical imagined debate by which a Mexican Indian and a Jew seek an understanding of the Christian faith from a Reformed Protestant, a Lutheran and Counter-Reformation Catholic, but only find squabbles and inconsistencies until their confusion is resolved by an anti-trinitarian.
- Disputatio Scholastica, is acknowledged as Palaeologus major literary achievement, a masterpiece of exuberant high renaissance latinity. The setting is another imagined satirical debate; only this time the protagonists are named religious authorities on both the Trinitarian and antitrinitarian sides, who have been called together by Almighty God to resolve before the whole world (Christian, Muslim and Jewish) their various claims about the nature of Christ. The treatise is unfinished, but it appears to have been intended to show that the leading modern Trinitarians; John Calvin and Pope Boniface VIII, are not only unjustified in their arguments, but also culpably misrepresent the ancient predecessors to whom they appeal.
- Commentarius in Apocalypsim, is in the form of a commentary on the Book of Revelation, but is actually another stinging attack on Pius V and the Inquisition, and is dedicated to his old friend and original mentor Giustiniani.
- Theodoro Bezae pro Castellione et Bellio (1575), is a defence of Sebastian Castellio against the criticisms of the Calvinist leader, Theodore Beza. Castellio was convicted and executed in Geneva for blasphemy and heresy in 1553 – in particular for his repudiation of the doctrine of the trinity.
- An omnes ab uno Adamo descenderint, is a refutation of the fundamental assumptions of the doctrine of Original Sin; arguing that all humans cannot descended from a single individual, and hence that there cannot be a strict transmission of inherited sin to all humanity.
- Confutatio vera et solida Iudicii Ecclesiarum Polonicarum de causa Francisci Davidis (1580)
- Defensio Francisci Davidis in negotio de non invocando Jesu Christo in precibus (1580)

These treatises were all printed by Budny in 1580; and defend Dávid against the charges of religious innovation in teaching nonadorantism; recording also Palaeologus' criticism of the role of Sozzini in the sorry affair.

- Ad scriptum fratrum Racoviensium de bello et judiciis forensibus Responsio, is Palaeologus' rejoinder to Gregory Paul's Adversus Jacobi Palaeologi de bello sententiam Responsio, itself a reply to Palaeologus treatise Defensio verae sententiae de magistratu politico (1572), about the obligation of a Christian to provide military service and secular allegiance to the rightful civil authorities.

== Teachings ==
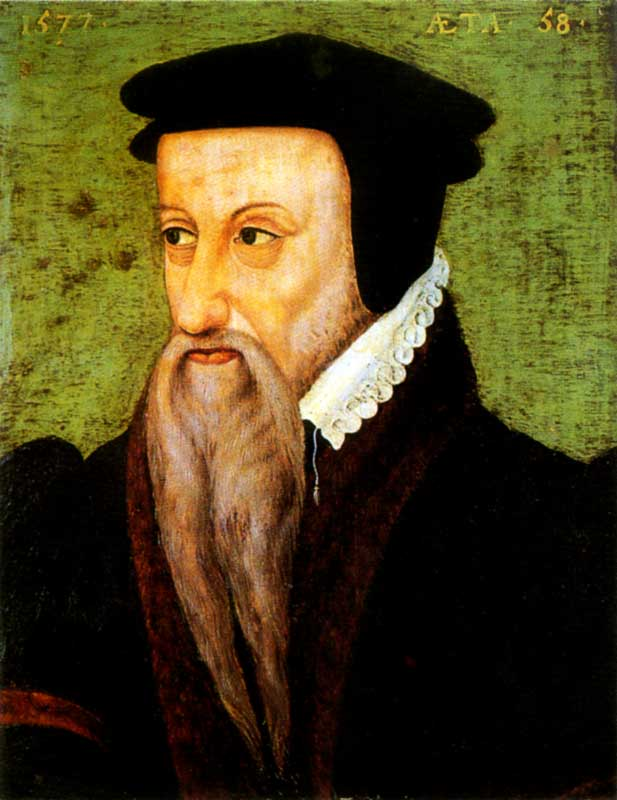
Thedore Beza, succeeded John Calvin as the leader of the Reformed church of Geneva; whose Trinitarian theology Palaeologus sought to expose as a Satanic perversion of the true Gospel

In common with all 16th century antitrinitarians, Palaeologus rejected three fundamental propositions:

- Original Sin; the doctrine that through the sin of Adam all humanity is lost to sin, and can only attain salvation through divine Grace operating through the sacraments of baptism and holy communion.
- Predestination; the doctrine that the eternal destination of every person to Heaven or Hell has been determined from the beginning of time by God's sovereign choice.
- The Trinity; the doctrine that within the unity of Almighty God, there are three persons; Father, Son and Holy Spirit; equal and pre-existent outside the bounds of time and space; and that the only way to salvation for all humanity is through the atonement for sin achieved by the crucifixion and resurrection of the incarnate Son of God.

Palaeologus held these propositions to be frauds, perpetrated on the faithful under the prompting of Satan as devices by which the clergy might establish and maintain control; and he sees Calvinism as presenting these false doctrines in their most developed form, although the same doctrines are similarly exploited in other churches. Palaeologus appears to believe that counterpart fabricated doctrines may function to maintain the dominance of a clerical elite in Judaism and Islam; if all three religions were to apply a critical appraisal to their traditions, then substantial common ground would be found, and Satan's design to undermine scriptural revelation would be confounded. But in any case, in Palaeologus view, Jews and Muslims cannot be expected to respond fully to Jesus as Messiah and Prophet so long as Christians continue to worship him as God.

Salvation, for Palaeologus comes only through faith, which he understands as being achieved fides ex auditu (Romans 10:17), through hearing and sharing the revealed word of God in the congregation of the faithful. Faith is assailed by sin, which Palaeologus understands as wrong intention rather than as wrong action; sin arises from seeking something that revealed scripture shows ought not to be desired.

Palaeologus emphasises that all mankind has free will and God offers to all a free choice of blessedness. Nevertheless, individual humans in a state of nature do not have the capability to appreciate or comprehend the full dimensions of the choice that is on offer, but can only grasp at fragments of true blessedness in the form of material rewards (possessions, power); or in the case of noble pagans, in the perfection of the individual soul. Full blessedness can only be apprehended through lifelong participation in the fellowship of faithful believers; where that faith is grounded in the Grace of divine revelation. For Palaeologus the religious life of a Christian (or Muslim or Jewish) congregation is a school of blessedness for its members; by which they may become prepared to respond to God's offer of salvation in full freedom. But that is conditional on those congregations rightly understanding and sharing God's revelation in the text of scripture. Since the instrument of God's Grace for salvation is identified with scriptural revelation, then those who fabricate false revelation or who twist the understanding of true revelation are, for Palaeologus, the agents of Satan.

=== Criticism of the Polish Brethren ===
Palaeologus had encountered the Polish Brethren of the ecclesia minor in Kraków, and much of his antitrinitarian teaching accords with theirs, while being more systematically expressed; and much more learned in presentation. He departed from their doctrines and practices, however, in two key respects; which proved the occasion for bitter controversy. Nevertheless, although Palaeologus perceived the arguments of his Polish opponents as Satanic perversions, this did not lead him to seek their suppression or that of their supporters. Just as hearing the revealed scriptures provides for Palaeologus an assured route to truth; so the exposure and confounding of error in free and open debate ensures the defeat of the Master of Lies.

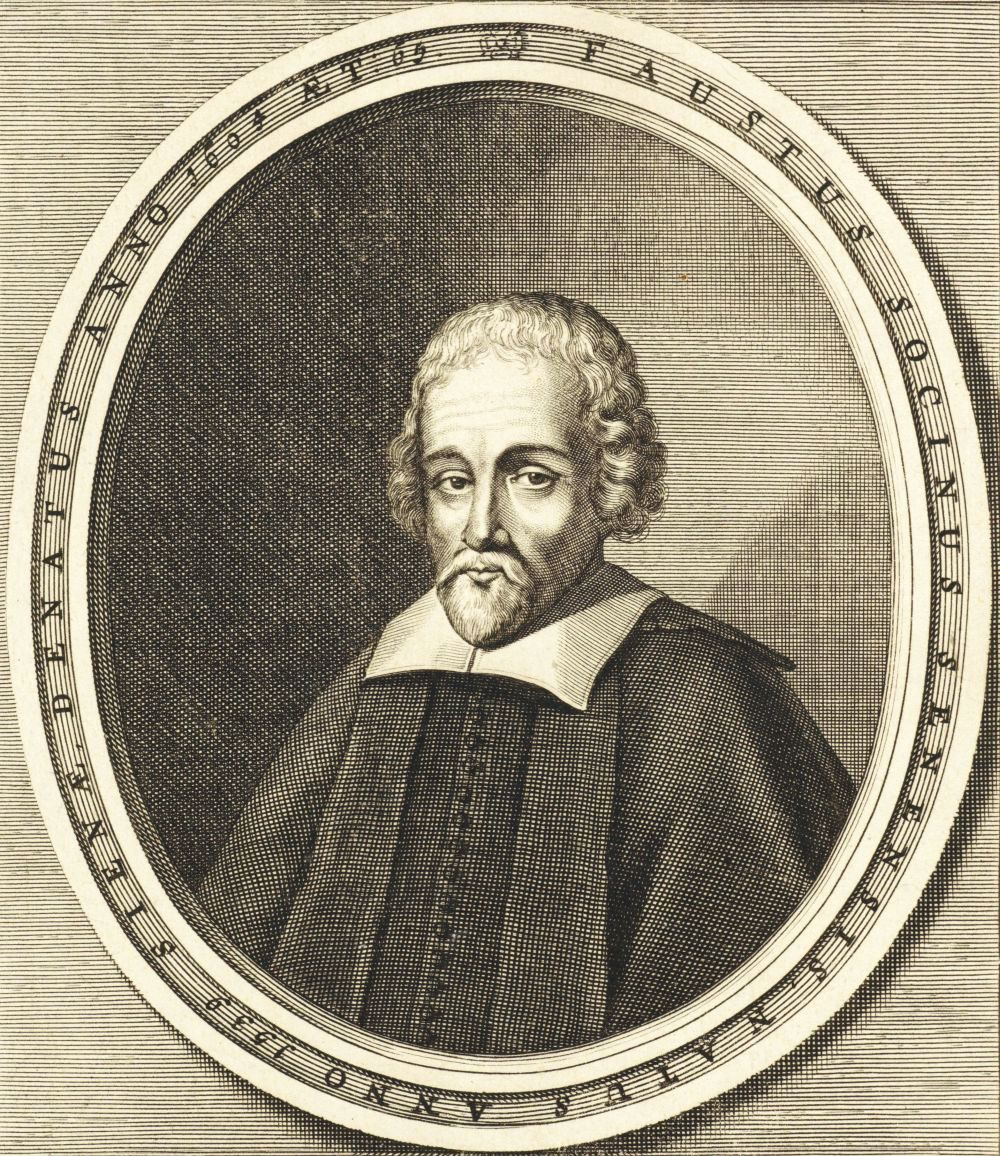
Fausto Sozzini, leading exponent of the theology of the Polish Brethren; attacked by Palaeologus both for advocating pacifism, and for his failure to support Ferenc Dávid

=== Nonadorantism ===
Although the Polish Brethren rejected the doctrine of the crucifixion as a sacrificial atonement for the sins of humanity, nevertheless they regarded Christ's sinless death and passion as promoting a saving faith through moral example, and Christ's resurrection as according him the status of Mediator for the faithful before the throne of God; and accordingly retained both a commemoration of the Lord's Supper and the invocation of Jesus by name in prayer. As formalised in the Catechism of George Schomann published in 1574, the church in Rakow retained many of the elements of trinitarian worship and doctrine, but re-expressed in accordance with antitrinitarian principles. For Palaeologus this was wholly unacceptable, as he understood the task of anti-trinitrarians in the present age to be "witnesses of the truth" (Revelation chapter 10), standing in open opposition to a world given temporarily over to the dominance of Satan. In due time the truth must triumph and Christ would return bring in the rule of the saints; but Almighty God could not allow that to happen while those saints were endowing Christ with the attributes of divinity. The veneration of Christ within the doctrine of the Trinity was, for Palaeologus, "Satan's design" to extend the period of his rule and stall the promised parousia, by corrupting the church into a form where Almighty God, in his absolute individual oneness, must turn away from it; and true antitrinitarians must not be compromised with it in any way.

=== Pacifism and utopian egalitarianism ===
The Polish Brethren, like almost all antitrinitarians, held that the Grace of salvation could only be achieved through full participation in the fellowship of faithful believers; and they consequently sought to reinforce this by separating themselves from the sinful world in an exclusive egalitarian community; in which secular distinctions of power and possession did not apply, and which resisted the demands of civil allegiance and military service. For Palaeologus, seeking the security offered by secular power, possessions and status was a valid, if fragmentary and inadequate, response to the universal human need for blessedness; and accordingly such motivations were not sinful in themselves; nor should believers reject distinctions of secular power and possession amongst one another, although distinctions of religious power and possessions were to be condemned. Palaeologus strongly resisted any suggestion that full participation in the fellowship of believers necessarily excludes either full participation in civic rights and allegiances, or the obligation to defend the legitimate civil order by military force; moreover he unreservedly condemned the practice of separation from the world, especially as this was enforced through the sanction of excommunication, a sanction that must necessarily deprive those subjected to it of eternal life.
