= Johann Ruchrat von Wesel =

German theologian (died 1481)

Johann Ruchrat von Wesel (died 1481) was a German Scholastic theologian. He objected to the system of indulgences, and has been called a "reformer before the Reformation".

He was born at Oberwesel early in the 15th century. He appears to have been one of the leaders of the humanist movement in Germany, and to have had some intercourse and sympathy with the leaders of the Hussites in Bohemia.

In terms of his philosophical leanings he most likely belonged to the nominalists. Erfurt was in his day the headquarters of a humanism which was both devout and opposed to the realist metaphysics and the Thomist theology which prevailed in the universities of Cologne and Heidelberg. Wesel was one of the professors at Erfurt between 1445 and 1456, and was vice-rector in 1458. In 1460 he was appointed preacher at Mainz, in 1462 at Worms, and in 1479, when an old and worn-out man, he was brought before the Dominican inquisitor Gerhard Elten of Cologne. The charges brought against him took a theological turn, though they were probably prompted by dislike of his philosophical views. They were chiefly based on a treatise, De indulgentiis, which he had composed while at Erfurt twenty-five years before. He had also written De potestate ecclesiastica. He died under sentence of imprisonment for life in the Augustinian convent in Mainz in 1481.

== Theology ==
It is somewhat difficult to determine the exact theological orientation of Wesel. Ullmann claims him as a "reformer before the Reformation", but, while he mastered the formal principle of Protestantism, that scripture is the sole rule of faith, it is more than doubtful that he had that experimental view of the doctrines of grace which lay at the basis of Reformation theology. He held that Christ is men's righteousness in so far as they are guided by the Holy Ghost, and the love towards God is shed abroad in their hearts, which clearly shows that he held the medieval idea that justification is an habitual grace implanted in men by the gracious act of God. He seems, however, to have protested against certain medieval ecclesiastical ideas which he held to be excrescences erroneously grafted on Christian faith and practice. He objected to the whole system of indulgences; he denied the infallibility of the church, on the ground, that the church contains within it sinners as well as saints; he insisted that papal authority could be upheld only when the pope remained true to the evangel; and he held that a sharp distinction ought to be drawn between ecclesiastical sentences and punishments, and the judgments of God.

Johann also held that God chooses some people to salvation, and believed in a church invisible.

== Literature ==
The best account of Wesel is to be found in K. Ullmann's Reformers before the Reformation. His tract on Indulgences is published in Walch's Monumenta Medii Aevi, volume i., while a report of his trial is given in Ortwin's Fasciculus rerum expetendarum et fugiendarum (ed. by Browne, London, 1690), and d'Argentré's Collectio judiciorum de novis erroribus (Paris, 1728).

== See also ==
- Wessel Gansfort
- Johann von Goch
