= Wessel Gansfort =

Dutch theologian (1419–1489)

Wessel Harmensz Gansfort
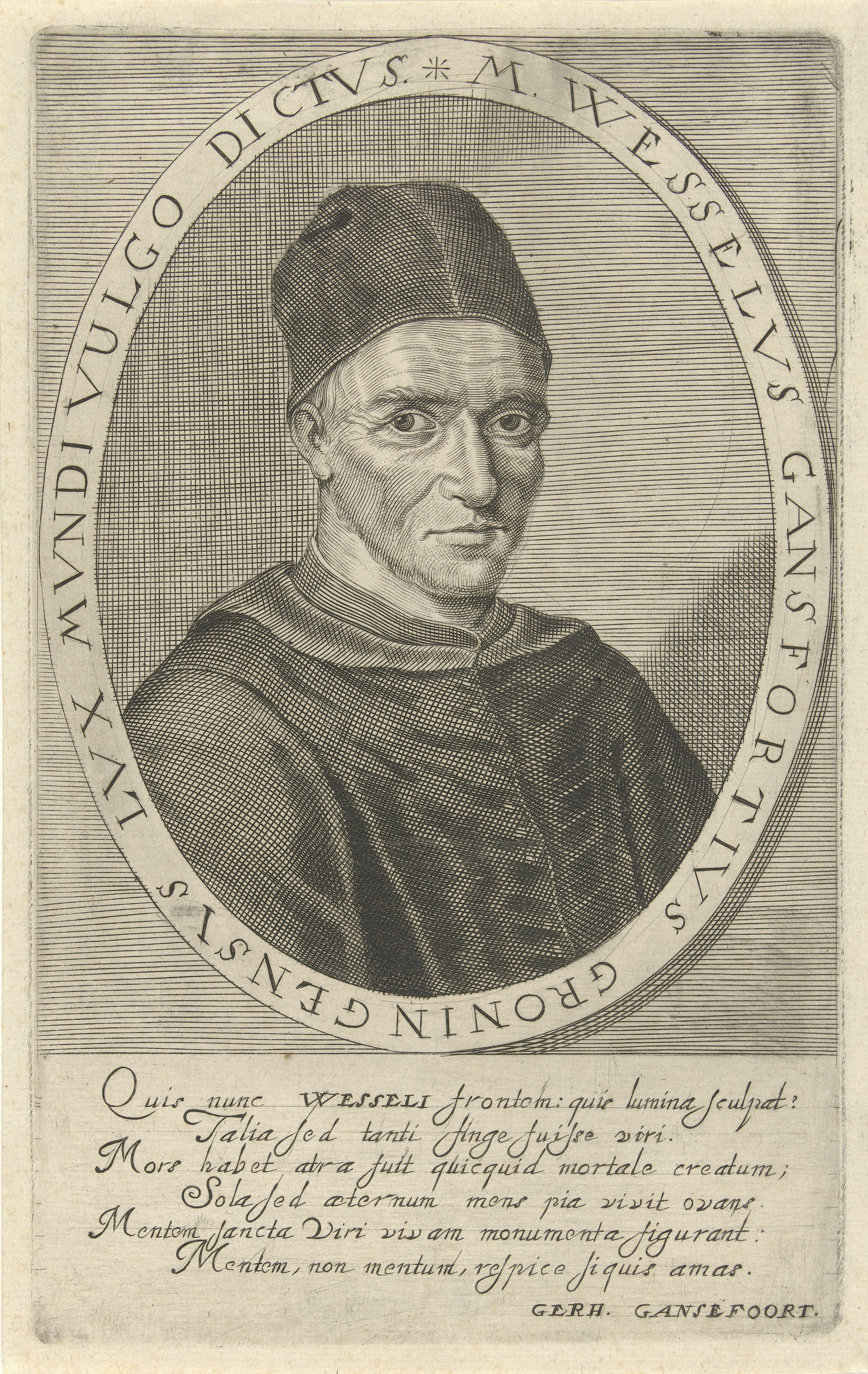
- Born: 1419; Groningen, Friesland, Holy Roman Empire
- Died: 4 October 1489 (aged 69–70); Groningen, Habsburg Netherlands, Holy Roman Empire
- Other name: Johan Wessel
- Occupations: Theologian; Humanist
- Known for: Grace oriented salvation, Criticism of Indulgences

Wessel Harmensz Gansfort (1419 – 4 October 1489) was a theologian and early humanist of the northern Low Countries. Many variations of his last name are seen and he is sometimes incorrectly called Johan Wessel.

Gansfort has been called one of the reformers before the Reformation. He protested against a perceived paganizing of the papacy, superstitious and magical uses of the sacraments, the authority of ecclesiastical tradition, and the tendency in later scholastic theology to lay greater stress, in a doctrine of justification, upon the instrumentality of the human will than on the work of Christ for man's salvation. Some of Gansfort's teachings foreshadowed the Protestant reformation.

== Early life and education ==
Gansfort was born at Groningen. After initial schooling at the local Latin school of St Martin's, he was educated at the municipal school of Zwolle, which was closely connected to the Brethren of the Common Life in whose house the young student lived. He developed close ties with the monastery of Mount St. Agnes not far from Zwolle, and became close friends with Thomas a Kempis.

His sixteenth-century biographer Albertus Hardenberg, who knew Gansfort's one-time famulus Goswinus van Halen, writes that Gansfort left Zwolle directly for Cologne, perhaps as late as 1449. At Cologne he stayed in the Bursa Laurentiana, where he soon became a teacher. He was granted the degree magister artium in 1452, and remembers with great gratitude that it was here that he first studied Plato. He learned Greek from monks who had been driven out of Greece, and Hebrew from some Jews. He was particularly interested in the Eucharistic theology of Rupert of Deutz, and he scoured local Benedictine libraries for works related to this devotion.

=== Work ===
Interest in the disputes between the realists and the nominalists in Paris induced him to go to that city, where he remained for sixteen years as a scholar and teacher. There, he eventually took the nominalist side, prompted as much by his mystical anti-ecclesiastical tendencies as by any metaphysical insight; for the nominalists were then the anti-papal party. A desire to know more about humanism sent him to Rome, where in 1470 he was the intimate friend of Italian scholars and under the protection of Cardinals Bessarion and Francesco della Rovere (general of the Franciscan order and afterwards Pope Sixtus IV). It is said that Sixtus would have gladly made Wessel a bishop, but that he had no desire for any ecclesiastical preferment but rather asked for a Hebrew Old Testament. This he took to Groningen, where he studied the text aloud to the bemusement of his fellow monks.

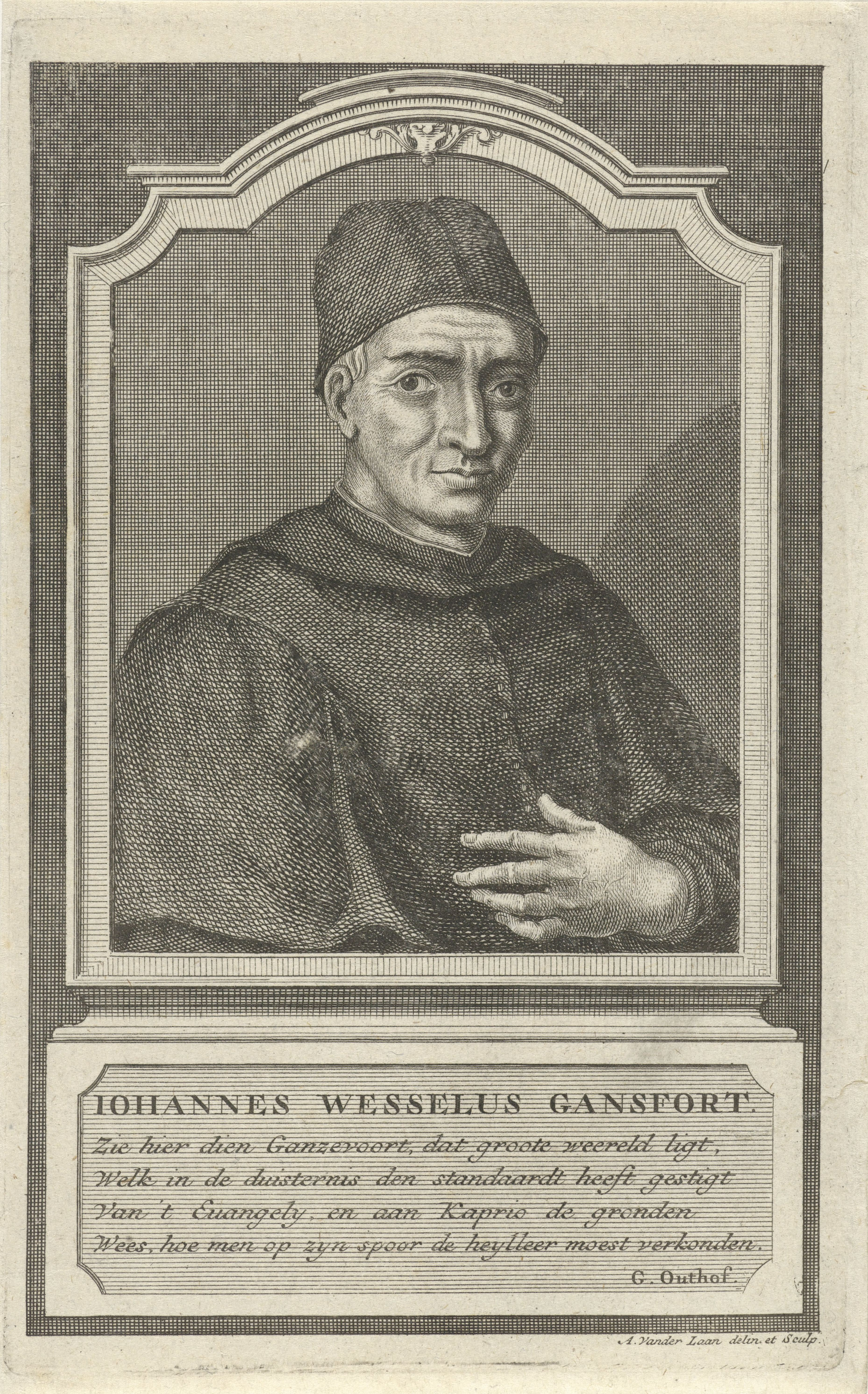
Portrait of Wessel

From Rome, Wessel returned to Paris and speedily became a famous teacher, gathering round him a band of enthusiastic young students, among whom was Reuchlin. In 1475, he was at Basel and, in 1476, at Heidelberg, teaching philosophy in the university. As old age approached, he grew to dislike the theological strife of scholasticism and turned away from that university discipline, non studia sacrarum literarum sed studiorum commixtae corruptiones. After thirty years of academic life, he returned to his native Groningen, and spent the rest of his life partly as director of the Olde Convent, a sister convent of the Order of Tertiaries, and partly in the convent of St. Agnes at Zwolle. He was welcomed as the most renowned scholar of his time, and it was fabled that he had travelled through all lands, Egypt as well as Greece, gathering everywhere the fruits of all sciences. To his friends, disciples and admirers, he imparted his rhetorical spirituality, a zeal for higher learning and the deep devotional spirit which characterized his own life. He died on 4 October 1489, with the confession on his lips: "I know only Jesus the crucified". He was buried in the middle of the choir of the church of the Olde Convent, which stood on what is now called the Rode Weeshuistraat but at the time was known as the Straat van de Geestelijke Maagden, whose director he had been. His bones were unearthed in 1862 in the presence of Gansfort's progeny, members of the American Gansevoort family. His remains were then relocated to the Martinikerk where a memorial had been erected. In 1962 his remains were unearthed again and taken to the Groningen anatomical laboratory for research. In absence of the main researcher, the bones were wrongly identified and for over 50 years were thought to have been destroyed. They were rediscovered in 2015 and to be reburied in the Martinikerk in 2017.

== Reputation and influence ==
The founders of the Protestant University of Groningen in 1614 considered Wessel Gansfort one of their intellectual predecessors, together with Rudolph Agricola (1444–85) and Regnerus Praedinius (1510–59). Early editions of works by Gansfort (e.g. Zwolle 1522, Basel 1523, Groningen 1614, Marburg 1617) on their title page call him the learned light of the world (Lux mundi).

== Theological views ==
Wessel Gansfort rejected the view of transubstantiation and indulgences. Wessel rejected the authority of the Catholic church and believed justification to be a work of God instead of man. Wessel believed that the pope and councils can err and are not infallible. The sacramental views of Wessel Gansfort anticipated those of Ulrich Zwingli.

While Wessel rejected the Catholic doctrine of purgatory, he did not absolutely reject a similar concept. Wessel believed that the fire of purgatory does not torment but only cleanses the inward man of impurity.

== Works ==
Individual works

Gansfort's major works are:

- De oratione et modo orandi
- Scala meditationis
- De causis incarnationis
- De dignitate et potestate ecclesiastica

There are also:

- De providentia
- De causis et effectibus incarnationis et passionis
- De sacramente, poenitentiae
- Quae sit vera communio sanctorum
- De purgatorio
- De sacramento Eucharistiæ et audienda missa

Several of his letters survive. Some his works are said to have been burned by his friends shortly after his death for fear of ecclesiastical inquisition.

Collections

- Farrago rerum theologicarum is the title of a collection of his writings published at Zwolle, probably in 1521 (reprinted at Wittenberg, 1522, and Basel, 1522, which last contains a preface by Luther). Martin Luther in 1521 published a collection of Wessel's writings which had been preserved as relics by his friends, and said that if he (Luther) had written nothing before he read them, people might well have thought that he had stolen all his ideas from them. McClintock and Strong's Cyclopedia describes Gansfort as "the most important among men of German extraction who helped prepare the way for the Reformation." The Sum of Christianity is an anonymous English translation of the Farrago.

A complete edition of his works appeared at Groningen in 1614, including a biography by the Protestant preacher Albert Hardenberg.

== See also ==
- Johann von Goch
- Johann Ruchrat von Wesel
