= Ferenc Dávid =

Hungarian preacher and Unitarian theologian (c. 1520–1579)

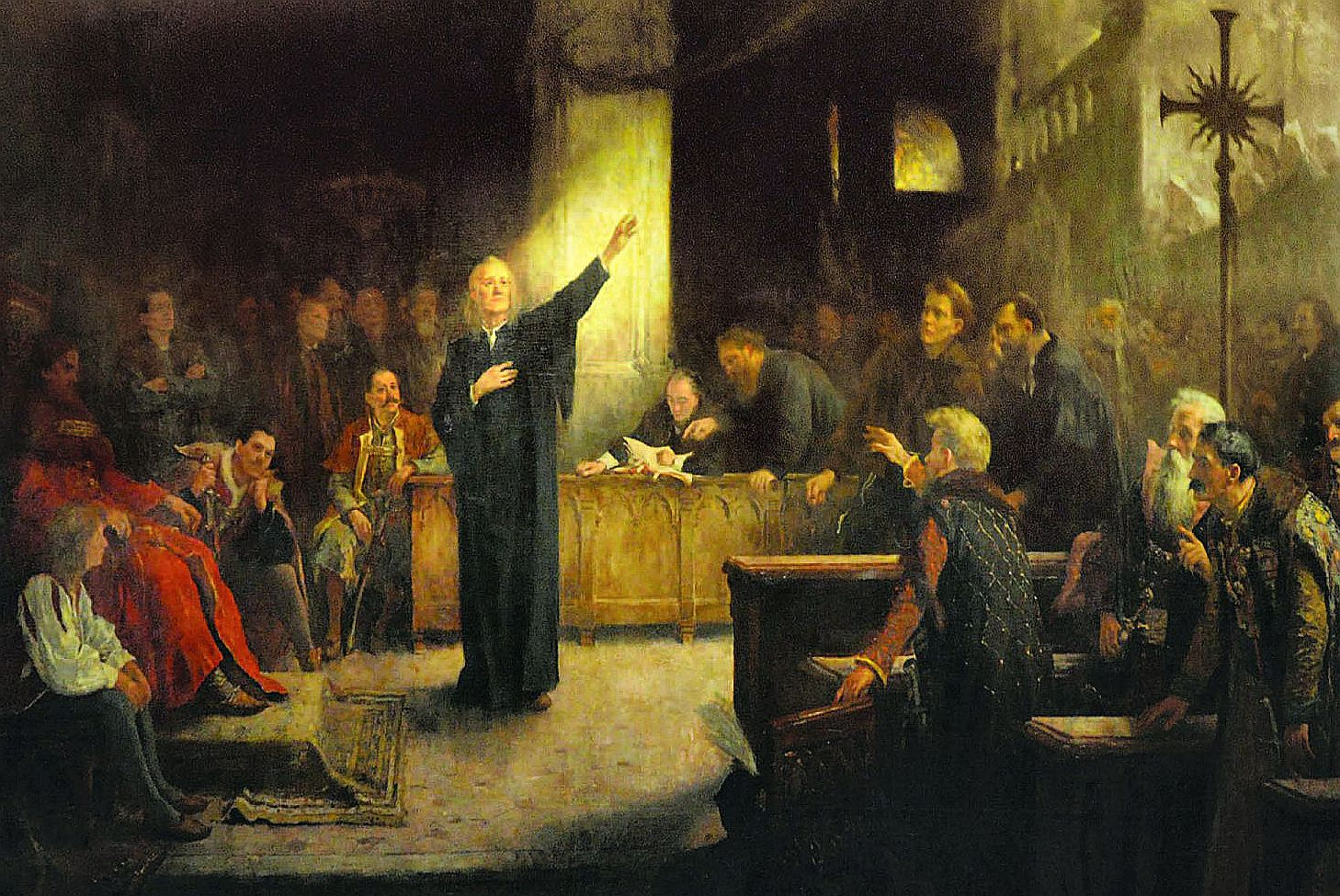
- Ferenc Dávid holding his speech on the Diet of Torda in 1568 (today Turda, Romania) by Aladár Körösfői-Kriesch (1896)
- Born: Franz David Hertel c. 1520; Kolozsvár, Kingdom of Hungary (today Cluj-Napoca, Romania)
- Died: 15 November 1579 (aged c. 58–59); Déva, Principality of Transylvania (today Deva, Romania)
- Education: University of Wittenberg; University of Frankfurt
- Known for: Founder of the Unitarian Church of Transylvania
- Notable work: Rövid Utmutatás az Istennec igeienec igaz ertelmere, mostani szent Haromsagrol tamadot vetélkedesnec meg feytesere es itelesere hasznos es szükseges
- Title: Christian theologian; Professor
- Spouse(s): Unidentified (1st); Kata Barát (Münich) (2nd)
- Children: 4

Philosophical work
- Era: Protestant Reformation; Radical Reformation
- Main interests: Unitarianism

Ferenc Dávid (also rendered as Francis David or Francis Davidis; born as Franz David Hertel, c. 1520 – 15 November 1579) was a preacher and theologian from Transylvania, the founder of the Unitarian Church of Transylvania, and the leading figure of the Nontrinitarian Christian movements during the Protestant Reformation. He disputed the mainstream Christian doctrine of the Trinity, believing God to be one and indivisible.

Studying Catholic theology in Wittenberg and in Frankfurt an der Oder, he was first ordained as a Roman Catholic priest, later he became a Lutheran minister and then a Calvinist bishop in the Principality of Transylvania. Throughout his career as a Christian theologian and professor, Dávid learnt the teachings and practices of the Roman Catholic and Magisterial Protestant churches, but later rejected several of them and came to embrace Unitarianism.

== Life ==
=== Early life ===
Ferenc Dávid was born in Kolozsvár, Hungary (present-day Cluj-Napoca, Romania), to a Transylvanian Saxon father (David Hertel, who worked as a tanner) and to a Hungarian mother. The Hertel/Herthel family was an old Transylvanian Saxon aristocratic family of Kolozsvár. In Latin and Hungarian he used his name as Francis Davidis or Dávid Ferenc after his father's forename David. He had at least three brothers: Gregor, Peter and Nikolaus. Peter and Gregor inherited the job of their father in the guild. Gáspár Heltai, the father of Peter's wife Borbála, was a Protestant Reformer, Lutheran and later Unitarian minister, translator, outstanding author of the Hungarian late Renaissance era. He owned the paper mill and the press of Kolozsvár where several religious and scientific books were made in Hungarian and German.

Ferenc Dávid was raised Catholic. After finishing his studies in the High School of Kolozsvár (today Cluj Napoca, Romania) he went to the Holy Roman Empire to study Catholic theology first at the University of Wittenberg and then later at the Alma Mater Viadrina (University of Frankfurt an der Oder) where he became a Catholic parson.

=== Lutheranism ===
In 1542 the Lutheran reformator, Johannes Honterus introduced the Lutheran doctrines to the citizens of Kolozsvár. After arriving back in Transylvania Ferenc Dávid joined the Lutheran wing of the Reformation where he became a minister and then a Lutheran bishop. He worked as headmaster of the Gymnasium of Beszterce (today Bistrița, Romania), then as Lutheran pastor in Petres (today Cetate, Romania), later headmaster of the Gymnasium of Kolozsvár and from 1555 chief pastor of Kolozsvár (today Cluj Napoca, Romania).

On 1 June 1557 the Diet of Torda (National Assembly) stated that 'everybody should live in a belief that he or she wants if it is done without the distrust of another' which meant for the population of the Principality of Transylvania that it became allowed to practise not just the Roman Catholic, but the Lutheran religion.

=== Calvinism ===
In 1559 he entered the Reformed Church where he was elected bishop of the Hungarian churches in Transylvania and he was also the appointed court preacher to János Zsigmond Zápolya, Prince of Transylvania. The prince allowed him to research in the royal library and to work in the royal court on his theological theses.

=== Unitarianism ===
After the Battle of Mohács the political instability, the waning of Roman Catholic influence (continuous expansion of the Ottoman Empire, heretic movements in Transylvania especially of Arianism, Bogumilism etc.) prepared the way for the new ideas of the Reformation. A well known Italian antitrinitarian, Giorgio Biandrata moved to Transylvania in 1563 into the royal court of John II Sigismund Zápolya and became his own doctor. Biandrata co-operated with Ferenc Dávid on theological works.

Dávid's discussion of the Holy Trinity began in 1565, with doubts of the personality of the Holy Spirit, because he thought he couldn't find any convincing scriptural basis for the doctrine of the Trinity. One of his main points against the existence of the Holy Trinity was that which the Arians during the early ages of Christianity liked to refer to – it does not seem to be explicitly clarified in the Bible. He was influenced by the antitrinitarian and humanist views of Michael Servetus and Giovanni Valentino Gentile.

Together with Giorgio Biandrata he published polemical writings against Trinitarian belief, particularly De falsa et vera unius Dei Patris, Filii et Spiritus Sancti cognitione which is largely a summarized version of Servetus's Christianismi Restitutio. But in 1578 the collaboration broke up as Biandrata was charged with immorality. An important difference between the views of the two theologians was that Ferenc Dávid became a nonadorant which meant that he renounced the necessity of invoking Christ in prayers.

Working in the royal court, he convinced the prince about his point of view on religion, so that John II Sigismund Zápolya accepted his theses and became the first Unitarian ruler. In 1567 John II Sigismund Zápolya allowed him to use his press in Gyulafehérvár (today Alba Iulia, Romania) to propagate the religion.

=== Edict of Torda (1568) ===
The aim of his life as Ferenc Dávid wrote was 'the restoration of the pure Christianity of Jesus' which meant for him the search for the truth in the whole freedom of thought. So he sought to persuade the prince, John II Sigismund Zápolya and several people in important positions to reach an agreement between the opposite sides of the religious debate. His attempts were successful.

Between 6 and 13 January 1568 on the Diet of Torda the assembled representatives of the Hungarian nobility, the Szeklers, the Transylvanian Saxons and the royal court of the Principality of Transylvania proclaimed the Edict of Torda which included – as first in Europe – the practising and propagation of the recepta religios (allowed religions) which were the Roman Catholic, the Lutheran, the Calvinist and the Unitarian. This order can be seen as the first law for the 'freedom of religion'. In the three lawful nations of Transylvania, the four lawfully allowed religions could have an ecclesiastical, political and public law system under the Constitution of the Principality of Transylvania. From that moment on, the constitution enacted the equal rights of the three nations and the four religions.

=== Prison and death ===
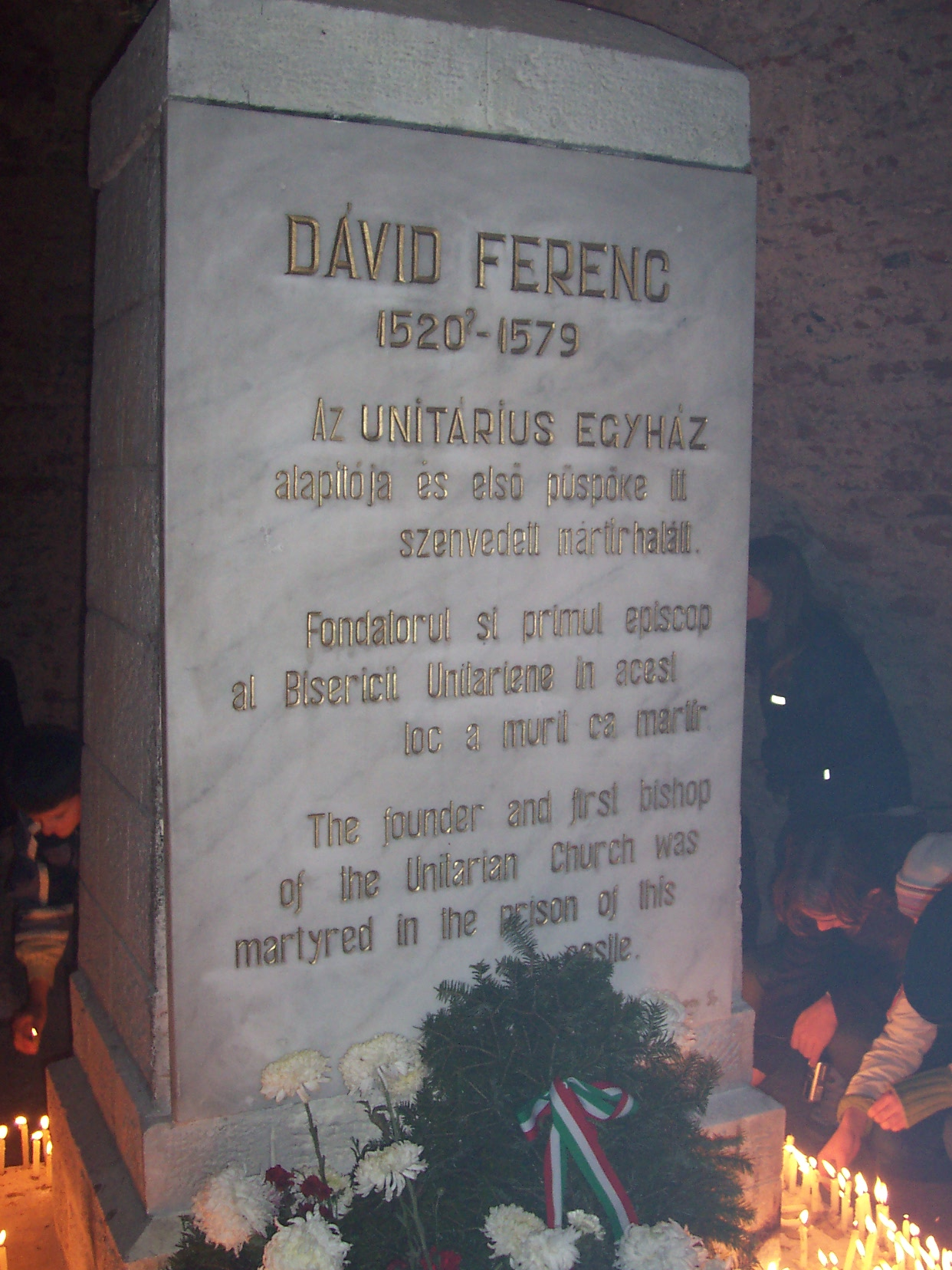
Memorial monument of Ferenc Dávid on his death place in Deva, Romania

In 1571, John II Sigismund Zápolya was succeeded by István Báthory, a Roman Catholic, and the policy shifted toward persecution of the new religious institutions. In the same year the new ruler took the press of Gyulafehérvár back from the Unitarians. On the Diet of 1572 in Marosvásárhely (today Târgu Mureș, Romania) the religious laws were strengthened, but it declared the prohibition of the changing of religion. When, under the influence of Johannes Sommer, rector of the Gymnasium of Kolozsvár, Dávid denied the necessity of invoking Jesus Christ in prayer (about 1572), the attempted mediation of Faustus Socinus, upon Blandrata's request, was unsuccessful. Ferenc Dávid was sentenced to life imprisonment in Déva, Principality of Transylvania (today Deva, Romania), and died there in 1579. The ruins of the prison site in the city now hold a memorial for him.

== Lukas Trauzner ==
After the death of Ferenc David, Lukas Trauzner, his son-in-law, wrote together with Miklós Bogáti Fazekas, Bernard Jacobinus (father of János Jacobinus) and the sons of Ferenc Dávid the Defensio Francisci Davidis in negotio de non invocando Jesu Christo in precibus (Basel, 1581) and were part of the inner opposition of the moderate Unitarianism movement of Demeter Hunyadi. Lukas Trauzner was sentenced to jail in 1579 because of his Sabbatarian-Unitarian beliefs. But after 1582 the political pressure eased. Lukas Trauzner and Gabriel Haller went to Vienna in 1598 in legation. The imperial commissioners described Trauzner as Sabbatarian and Haller as Arianist. Later he was active in the political negotiations between Transylvania and Austria. In 1603 he was a dedicated follower of the prince, Mózes Székely. He as a Unitarian undertook in the name of the prince to get the citizens of Beszterce into submission. After the defeat of Mózes Székely started the reign of Giorgio Basta in Kolozsvár who captured the royal judge, Mihály Tótházi and without a sentence beheaded him. Lukas Trauzner had to go to jail for two months, but by leaving the Unitarian Church and by apostasy he could get free. He lived from then on as a Catholic and but stayed as an active member of the mostly Unitarian Transylvanian Saxon community in Kolozsvár until his death.

== Beliefs ==
=== Christology ===
Scholars still have to address fully Ferenc Dávid's Hungarian works for a satisfactory assessment of his beliefs.

=== Invocation controversy ===
In his early years as a Nontrinitarian, Dávid supported prayer to Christ, as can be seen in his answer to Péter Melius Juhász, the Refutatio scripti Petri Melii ('Refutation of the writings of Péter Méliusz', Alba Iulia, 1567). In his later years Dávid adopted the radical, nonadorant view of Jacob Palaeologus, that Christ should not be invoked in prayer, but that prayer should be directed only to God the Father. According to Ferenc David, Jesus is understood as a human being.

=== Virgin birth ===
After leaving Calvinism, Dávid adopted the view of Laelio Sozzini that the existence of Christ began when he was conceived by the Virgin Mary through the operation of the Holy Spirit. By 1578, it would appear that Dávid had come to adopt the view that Jesus was the literal son of Joseph. However some historians dispute this and argue that he believed in the virgin birth until the day of his death. Certainly these skeptical views were not held by the Unitarian Church of Transylvania in his lifetime, nor included in the later Hungarian Unitarian statement of faith of David's successor Mihály Lombard de Szentábrahám. Such views were, however, held by sympathizers of the Polish Symon Budny.

=== Controversy ===
His main antagonists in public disputations were the Calvinist leader Péter Melius Juhász and Antitrinitarian Giorgio Blandrata.

== Personal life ==
He married twice. The name of his first wife is unknown, she died in 1570 in Kolozsvár. His second wife was Kata Barát, the daughter of István Barát (Stephan Münich), melodist and the chief judge of Kolozsvár. This marriage lasted from 1572 just two years. He had four children:

- Käthe (1557/1560–?), the wife of Lukas Trauzner, the treasurer of the furrier guild of Kolozsvár (today Cluj Napoca, Romania)
- David (1560 – 27 March 1582), theologian, Unitarian minister who studied at the University of Basel in Basel, Switzerland between 1578 and 1580
- Sophia, wife of Johann Sommer (1542–1572) theologian, Unitarian minister, humanist writer (according to Johann Seivert)
- Johannes, doctor in Kolozsvár (today Cluj Napoca, Romania) (c. 1565 – ?)

== Influence ==
=== Influence in Hungary and Transylvania ===
After his death Dávid came to be counted as, and honoured as, the first in the line of Hungarian Unitarian bishops based in Kolozsvár (Cluj). His writings continued to be published, and other recollections written down and collected, up to the time of Mihály Lombard de Szentábrahám.

=== Influence of Ferenc Dávid in England and America ===
English-speaking Unitarianism was largely unaware of Dávid. Most of the Unitarian writings which came via Amsterdam to England were of authors of the Polish Brethren, not Hungarians, as in the Bibliotheca Fratrum Polonorum quos Unitarios vocant (or "Library of the Polish Brethren called Unitarians") of which Locke, Voltaire and Newton owned copies. The works of Dávid and György Enyedi's were not reprinted in the 17th century. It was the visit of Sándor Bölöni Farkas to Britain and America from 1830 to 1832, which made English speaking Unitarians aware of the continued existence of Hungarian Unitarians – and following that, of the legacy of Ferenc Dávid.

The Unitarian Universalist author John A. Buehrens (1989) attributes to Ferenc Dávid the statement, "We need not think alike to love alike". The phrase is cited also in Our Historic Faith by Mark W. Harris and in the 1993 Unitarian Universalist Hymnal Singing the Living Tradition in reading #566, which is a compilation of quotes by David, compiled by Rev. Richard Fewekes, but the source for this is not given in either case. The phrase is given in no source prior to Buehren's book. In an article published by UU World, "Who Really Said That?" Peter Hughes claims that there is no evidence that Dávid actually said this. He attributes the quote to Methodist founder John Wesley, who asked in a sermon on "Catholic Spirit," "Though we cannot think alike, may we not love alike?"

== Works ==
Works of Dávid, and of the Unitarian Church.

- 1550 Elegia, Scripta ad Eximium D. Franciscum, I. V. Doctorem, ac Vicarium Ecclesiae Albensis in Transsylvania... Maecenatem suum semper colendum.
- 1555 Dialysis Scripti Stancari Contra Primum Articulum Synodi Szekiensis, qui de doctrina controvertitur, conscripta. Cluj-Napoca, 1555.
- 1556 Responsum ministrorum Ecclesiae Colosvariensis ad scripta varia Martini a Calmancha in Causa Coena Domini edita Colosvarini. Anno 1556. die 25. Julii.
- 1557 Consensus Doctrinae De Sacramentis Christi Claudiopoli, 1557.
- 1558 Acta Synodi Pastorum Ecclesiae Nationis Hungaricae in Transylvania... Anno 1558. in oppido Thorda celebratae. U. ott, 1558.
- 1559 Az Vrnac Vaczoraiarol Valo közenséges keresztyéni vallas. Colosvarot, 1559.
- 1559 Defensio Orthodoxae Sententiae de Coena Domini (Kolozsvár), 1559.
- 1556 Scriptum Francisci Davidis anno Domini 1566. (Lampe, Hist. Eccl. Hungar. 152–154. l.)
- Ejudem Francisci Davidis Responsio ad Argumenta, quibus Hypostasin Spiritus Sancti Petrus Caroli stabilivit. (Lampe, Hist. Eccl. Hungar. 154–158. l.)
- 1566 Propositiones in Disputatione Albensi coram Regia Maiestate a D. Georgio Blandrata et Francisco Davidis propositae Limitationi Ministrorum, qui ex Ecclesiis Hungaricis Disputationi interfuerunt. Kolozsvár, 1566.
- 1566 Catechismus Ecclesiarum Dei in natione Hungarica per Transilvaniam. Claudiopoli, 1566.
- 1566 Disputatio prima Albana seu Albensis, habita 1566. 24. Febr. U. ott, 1566.
- 1567 De Falsa et Vera Vnius Dei Patris, Filii, et Spiritvs Sancti Cognitione Libri Dvo. Albae Juliae, 1567.
- 1567 Rövid Magyarazat mikeppen az Antichristvs, az igaz Istenről valo tudomant meg homalositotta... Albae Juliae, 1567.
- Rövid Utmutatás az Istennec igeienec igaz ertelmere, mostani szent Haromsagrol tamadot vetélkedesnec meg feytesere es itelesere hasznos es szükseges, Albae Juliae, 1567
- Refvtatio Scripti Petri Melii, quo nomine Synodi Debrecinae docet Johoualitatem, et trinitarium Deum Patriarchis, Prophetis, et Apostolis incognitum. Albae Juliae, 1567.
- Demonstratio Falsitatis Doctrinae Petri Melii, et reliquorum Sophistarum per Antitheses una cum refutatione Antitheseon veri et Turcici Christi, nunc primum Debrecini impressarum... Albae Juliae (1568.)
- Refutatio Propositionum Petri Melii non inquirendae Veritatis ergo sed ad contendendum propositarum, ad indictam Synodum Varadinam 22. Augusti Anno 1568.
- Theses Thordae Disputandae ad XIII Diem Nouembris, et in Synodo Varadina die 22. Augusti publicatae. U. ott. (Névtelenűl.)
- Literae convocatoriae ad Seniores Ecclesiarum Svperioris et Inferioris Pannoniae ad indictam Synodum Thordanam ad tertium Marty diem, additis Thesibus ibidem disputandis. U. ott, 1568.
- Aequipollentes ex Scriptura Phrases de Christo Filio Dei ex Maria Nato Figuratae... U. ott, 1568.
- Antithesis Pseudochristi cum vero illo ex Maria Nato. U. ott, 1568.
- Az Szent Irasnac Fvndamentamabol vött Magyarazat az Jesus Cristusrol es az ő igaz istensegeről. U. ott, 1568.
- De Mediatoris Jesv Christi hominis Divinitate, Aequalitateque libellus. U. ott, 1568.
- Brevis Enarratio Dispvtationis Albanae de Deo Trino, et Christo Dvplici coram Serenissimo Principe, et tota Ecclesia decem diebus habita. U. ott, 1568.
- De Regno Christi Liber primus. De Regno Antichristi Liber secundus. Accessit Tractatus de Paedobaptismo, et Circumcisione. U. ott, 1569.
- Propositiones Francisci Davidis ex Ungarico Sermone in Latinum conversae et in eadem Synodo Varadiensi (Ao 1569.) exhibitae.
- Az Váradi Disputacionac avagy vetelkedesnec, az egy Attya Istenről es annac Fiaról, az Jesus Cristusról és a szent Lélekről igazán valo elő számlalássa. Kolozsvár, 1569.
- Első Resze az szent irasnac külön külön reszeiből vöt predicaciocnac az atya istenről, ennek kedig az ő fiaról az Ihesvs Christvsrol, es az mi öröcseguncnec peczetiről az szent lelekről. Gyula-Fehérvár, 1569.
- Refutatio Scripti Georgii Maioris, in quo Devm trinvm in personis, et vnvm in Essentia: Vnicvm deinde eius Filium in persona, et duplicem in naturis, ex lacunis Antichristi probate conatus est. (Kolozsvár), 1569.
- Könyvetske Az igaz Kerestyéni Keresztségről, es a Pápa Antichristusnac Maymozássaról... Kolozsvár, 1570.
- Responsio Pastorum ac Ministrorum Ecclesiarum in Transsylvania, quae vnvm Deum Patrem Christi Jesum Christum filium Dei crucifixum vnvmqu. amborum spiritum confitentur. U. ott, 1570.
- Az Egy ő magatol való Felséges Istenről, es az ő igaz Fiarol, a Nazareti Jesusrol, az igaz Messiasrol, A szent irásból vöt vallástéttel. U. ott, 1571.
- Az egy Attya Istennec, es az ő aldot szent fianac, az Jesus Christusnac Istenségekről igaz vallastéttel... U. ott, 1571.
- Literae Convocatoriae, una cum Propositionibus in Synodo Vasarhellyina disputandis ad diem XX. Mensis Septembris, hujus Anni 1571. U. ott.
- Libellus Parvus, XXX Thesibus Blandratae oppositus, in quo disseritur Jesum Christum vocari nunc non posse Deum, cum non sit verus Deus... U. ott, 1578.
- Confessio Francisci Davidis de Jesu Christo quam ex carcere exhibuit. Regnicolis, paulo ante mortem Thordae, in Transylvania, in conuentu regni 17. April. Anno 1570.
- Isteni dicsiretek, imádságos és vigasztaló énekek. (1575)

== Literature ==
- KERESZTÉNY MAGVETÕ – ÚJABB ADATOK DÁVID FERENC CSALÁDJÁRÓL ÉS NEMZETISÉGÉRŐL – Series 78 /Part 1 (1972.)
- Dr. György Boros – Dávid Ferenc theológiája.
