= Magisterial Reformation =

Movement within the Protestant Reformation

The Magisterial Reformation refers in particular to the history of the Lutheran, Reformed, and Anglican traditions within Protestant Christianity, in how these denominations "related to secular authorities, such as princes, magistrates, or city councils", i.e. "the magistracy". While the Radical Reformation (that led to the Anabaptist churches) rejected any secular authority over the church, the Magisterial Reformation argued for the interdependence of the church and secular authorities. As Alister McGrath put it "The magistrate had a right to authority within the church, just as the church could rely on the authority of the magistrate to enforce discipline, suppress heresy, or maintain order."

The major theological figures representing the Magisterial Reformation were Luther, Zwingli, Calvin, and Knox, as well as Thomas Cranmer. The Magisterial Reformers believed that secular authority should be followed where it did not clash with biblical commands. An early example of this was seen in the Peasant's Rebellion of 1525, towards which Luther had been sympathetic, but which later he condemned.

The term magisterial relates also to the emphasis these denominations place on the authority of the teachers of the early church (such as St Augustine of Hippo).

The churches in the Magisterial Reformation deny to the Church of Rome exclusive claims to Catholic, i.e. of being the only one true church, insisting rather that they too remain part of the Catholic Church as set out in the Nicene Creed.

== See also ==
- Summus episcopus
