= Johannes von Goch =

German monk

Johannes von Goch (born Johann Pupper) (c. 1400 – 1475) was a German Augustinian friar, thought by some to be a precursor of the Reformation, because of his views on scripture, justification and monasticism.

== Biography ==
He was born at Goch in the Rhineland, probably studied at Paris, and was the founder of an order of canonesses at Tabor, near Mechelen in Brabant, in 1451, of which he subsequently became prior.

Johann Pupper was educated by the Brothers of the Common Life, as a priest he studied law at Cologne in around 1454.

== Theology ==
He may in some respects be considered a precursor of the Reformation, and in his writings, De Libertate Christiana, De Quatuor Erroribus circa Legem Evangelicam, and Epistola Apologetica (1521), he attacks the influence of Pelagianism in the Church, and advocates a return to the text of the Bible as the only true source of religious truth. He was considered a man of profound piety. Johann Pupper said that the "writings of the church fathers only have authority to the extent that they conform to the canonical truth". Johann also criticized vows and believed in nominalism. Johann Pupper was also a mystic, he was very concerned for union with God in love, and believed that man must be filled by God's love so that he can arrive at union with God.

Johannes von Goch renounced the Catholic view on justification, and questioned monasticism. Ullmann argued that Johannes von Goch anticipated Martin Luther in the doctrine of justification by faith alone.

== See also ==
- Wessel Gansfort
- Johann Ruchrat von Wesel
