= 1509 in literature =

List of years in literature	(table)
- … 1499; 1500; 1501; 1502; 1503; 1504; 1505; 1506; 1507; 1508; 1509; 1510; 1511; 1512; 1513; 1514; 1515; 1516; 1517; 1518; 1519 …
- Art; Archaeology; Architecture; Literature; Music; Philosophy; Science; +...

This article contains information about the literary events and publications of 1509.

== Events ==
- unknown dates
  - Alexander Barclay's The Shyp of Folys of the Worlde and Henry Watson's The Shyppe of Fooles appear. Both are English verse translations ultimately deriving from Sebastian Brant's satire Das Narrenschiff (1494).
  - Desiderius Erasmus writes The Praise of Folly while staying with Thomas More in England.
  - The early 14th-century verse romance Richard Coer de Lyon is first published, by Wynkyn de Worde in England.

== New books ==
=== Prose ===
- Desiderius Erasmus – Stultitiae Laus (The Praise of Folly)
- Fortunatus (published in Augsburg)
- Francesco Guicciardini – Storie fiorentine (History of Florence)
- Manjarasa – Samyukta Koumudi
- Luca Pacioli – De divina proportione (illustrations by Leonardo da Vinci)
- John Stanbridge – Vulgaria

=== Drama ===
- Ludovico Ariosto – I suppositi

=== Poetry ===
- Stephen Hawes
  - The Convercyon of Swervers
  - A Joyfull Medytacyon to all Englande
  - The History of Graunde Amour and la Bel Pucel, conteining the knowledge of the Seven Sciences and the Course of Mans Life in this Woride or The Pastyme of Pleasure

== Births ==
- April 25 – Thomas Vaux, English court poet (died 1556)
- July 10 – John Calvin, French Protestant religious leader and writer (died 1564)
- August 3 – Étienne Dolet, French humanist writer and printer (executed 1546)
- unknown dates
  - Kanaka Dasa, Indian Kannada poet, philosopher, musician and composer from Karnataka (died 1609)
  - William Turner, English ornithologist and cleric (died 1568)

== Deaths ==
- June 28 – John Filipec, Bohemian royal advisor and later monk, proprietor of a printing press (born 1431)
- unknown date
  - Aliénor de Poitiers, Burgundian courtier and writer (born c.1444)
  - Juraj Šižgorić, Croatian poet writing in Latin (born c. 1440/1445)
