= 1505 in literature =

List of years in literature	(table)
- … 1495; 1496; 1497; 1498; 1499; 1500; 1501; 1502; 1503; 1504; 1505; 1506; 1507; 1508; 1509; 1510; 1511; 1512; 1513; 1514; 1515 …
- Art; Archaeology; Architecture; Literature; Music; Philosophy; Science; +...

This article contains information about the literary events and publications of 1505.

== Events ==
- Unknown date
  - Thomas Murner is "crowned" Poet Laureate to Maximilian I, Holy Roman Emperor.
  - Giovanni Battista Ramusio becomes secretary to Alvise (or Aloisio) Mocenigo, member of the patrician Mocenigo family.

== New books ==
=== Prose ===
- Georges Chastellain (died 1475) – Récollections des merveilles advenues en mon temps
- Stephen Hawes – The Temple of Glass
- Lodovico Lazzarelli (died 1500) – Crater Hermetis
- Pierre Le Baud (died September 29) – Cronique des roys et princes de Bretaigne armoricane (completed)
- Primer of Claude of France

=== Poetry ===
- Pietro Bembo – Gli Asolani
- Jean Lemaire de Belges – Epîtres de l'amant vert

== Births ==
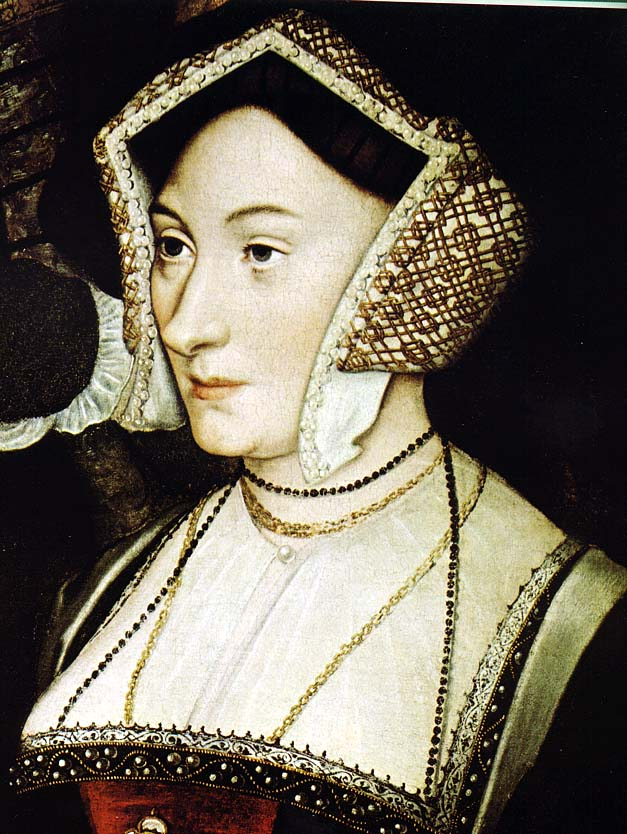
Margaret Roper (1505-1544)

- February 4 – Mikołaj Rej, Polish poet, politician and musician (died 1569)
- Unknown date – Margaret Roper, English writer and translator, daughter of Thomas More (died 1544)
- Approximate year
  - Nicholas Bourbon, French court preceptor and poet (died 1550)
  - Lodovico Castelvetro, Italian literary critic (died 1571)
  - John Wedderburn, Scottish religious reformer and poet (died 1556)
  - Hugh Weston, English churchman and academic (died 1556)
  - Georg Wickram, German poet and novelist (died before 1562)
  - Wu Cheng'en, Chinese novelist and poet (died c. 1580)

== Deaths ==
- August 30 – Tito Vespasiano Strozzi, Italian Latin-language poet (born c. 1424)
- September 29 – Pierre Le Baud, French historian (born c.1450)
- October 4 (buried) – Robert Wydow, English poet, church musician and cleric (born 1446)
- Unknown date
  - Adam of Fulda, German musical writer (born c. 1445)
  - Al-Suyuti, Egyptian religious scholar, juristic expert, teacher and Islamic theologian (born c. 1445)
  - Veit Arnpeck, Bavarian historian (born 1440)
