= 1507 in literature =

List of years in literature	(table)
- … 1497; 1498; 1499; 1500; 1501; 1502; 1503; 1504; 1505; 1506; 1507; 1508; 1509; 1510; 1511; 1512; 1513; 1514; 1515; 1516; 1517 …
- Art; Archaeology; Architecture; Literature; Music; Philosophy; Science; +...

This article contains information about the literary events and publications of 1507.

== Events ==
- August 26 – Following the death of Jean Molinet (see Deaths section), Jean Lemaire de Belges is appointed historiographer to the court of Charles, Duke of Burgundy.
- September 15 – King James IV grants Walter Chepman and Androw Myllar a patent to found the first printing press in Scotland.

== New books ==
=== Prose ===
- Matthias Ringmann (probably) – Cosmographiae Introductio (to accompany Martin Waldseemüller's globe and map)
- Francesco Spinacino – Intabollatura de lauto (earliest known published scores for lute)

=== Poetry ===
- Jean Lemaire de Belges – Les Chansons de Namur
- Baptista Mantuanus
  - Mantuan Georgius
  - Obiurgatio cum exortatione ad capienda arma contra infideles ad Potentatos Christianos (Charge and exhortation over the arms of infidels against Christian potentates)
  - Parthenese
- Jean Marot – Le Voyage de Gênes

== Births ==
- January 25 – Johannes Oporinus, Swiss printer (died 1568)
- April 13 – Konrad Hubert, German religious reformer and hymn writer (died 1577)
- June 6 – Annibale Caro, Italian poet and translator (died 1566)

== Deaths ==
- July 5 – (Petrus) Crinitus (Pietro Crinito), Florentine Italian humanist scholar and Latin-language poet (born 1474)
- August 23 – Jean Molinet, French Burgundian poet, chronicler and composer (born 1435)
- November 6 – Pietro Casola, travel writer (born 1427)
