= 1503 in literature =

List of years in literature	(table)
- … 1493; 1494; 1495; 1496; 1497; 1498; 1499; 1500; 1501; 1502; 1503; 1504; 1505; 1506; 1507; 1508; 1509; 1510; 1511; 1512; 1513 …
- Art; Archaeology; Architecture; Literature; Music; Philosophy; Science; +...

This article contains information about the literary events and publications of 1503.

== Events ==
- August 8 – King James IV of Scotland marries Margaret Tudor in Edinburgh. This is thought to be the occasion for which the Hours of James IV of Scotland was produced, probably in Ghent.
- unknown dates
  - The first English translation of Thomas à Kempis' The Imitation of Christ is published .
  - An edition of Euripides' Tragoediae is published.

== New books ==
- Niccolò Machiavelli
  - A Description of the Manner in which Duke Valentino put Vitellozzo Vitelli, Oliverotto da Fermo, Lord Pagola and the Duke of Gravina to Death (Descrizione del modo tenuto dal Duca Valentino nello ammazzare Vitellozzo Vitelli, Oliverotto da Fermo, il Signor Pagolo e il duca di Gravina Orsini)
  - On the method of dealing with the Rebellious Peoples of Valdichiana (Del modo di trattare i popoli della Valdichiana ribellati)

== New poetry ==
- William Dunbar – The Thrissil and the Rois
- Jean Lemaire de Belges – La Plainte du Désiré
- "Robin Hood and the Potter" (ballad)

== Births ==
- March 22 – Antonio Francesco Grazzini, Florentine author (died 1584)
- June 28 – Giovanni della Casa, Florentine Latin-language writer on etiquette and poet (died 1556)
- November 17 – Bronzino, born Agnolo di Cosimo, Florentine Mannerist painter and poet (died 1572)
- December 14 (or 21) – Nostradamus, French apothecary and astrologer (died 1566)
- December 20 – Cosimo Bartoli, Italian diplomat, mathematician, philologist, humanist and translator (died 1572)
- unknown dates
  - Robert Estienne, French printer (died 1559)
  - Diego Hurtado de Mendoza, Spanish poet, novelist, historian and diplomat, governor of Granada (died 1575).
  - Thomas Wyatt, English lyric poet and diplomat (died 1542)
- probable – Nicholas Bourbon, French court preceptor and poet (died 1550)

== Deaths ==
- February 14 – Annamacharya, Indian Hindu saint and Telugu poet (born 1408)
- April 26 – Johannes Tolhopff, German astrologist (born c.1450)
- September 17 – Iovianus Pontanus, Italian Latin-language humanist and poet (born 1426)
- unknown dates
  - Johann Bämler, German printer, illuminator and bookseller (born 1430)
- probable – Antonio Bonfini, Italian-born humanist historian and poet (born 1434)
