= 1501 in literature =

List of years in literature	(table)
- … 1491; 1492; 1493; 1494; 1495; 1496; 1497; 1498; 1499; 1500; 1501; 1502; 1503; 1504; 1505; 1506; 1507; 1508; 1509; 1510; 1511 …
- Art; Archaeology; Architecture; Literature; Music; Philosophy; Science; +...

This article contains information about the literary events and publications of 1501.

== Events ==
- Italic type (cut by Francesco Griffo) is first used by Aldus Manutius at the Aldine Press in Venice, in an octavo edition of Virgil's Aeneid. Manutius also publishes an edition of Petrarch's Le cose volgari and first adopts his dolphin and anchor device.
- The first volume of Harmonice Musices Odhecaton, the first collection of polyphonic music printed from movable type, is published by Ottaviano Petrucci in Venice.

== New books ==
=== Prose ===
- Desiderius Erasmus – Handbook of a Christian Knight (Enchiridion militis Christiani)
- Margery Kempe – The Book of Margery Kempe (posthumous)
- Nilakantha Somayaji – Tantrasamgraha

=== Drama ===
- Conradus Celtis – Ludus Diannae

=== Poetry ===
- Gavin Douglas – The Palice of Honour (approximate date of composition)
- Marko Marulić – Judita (in Croatian)

== Births ==
- February 24 – Sixt Birck, German humanist dramatist and scholar (died 1554)
- unknown dates
  - Bonaventure des Périers, French author and poet (suicide 1544)
  - Maurice Scève, French poet (died c. 1564)
  - Basilio Zanchi, Italian humanist Latin-language poet, scholar and librarian (died 1588) (born c. 1435)
- probable – Garcilaso de la Vega, Spanish soldier and poet (died 1536)

== Deaths ==
- January 3 – Ali-Shir Nava'i, Timurid dynasty philosopher and Chagatai language poet (born 1441)
- August (probable) – Constantine Lascaris, Greek scholar and grammarian (born 1434)
- September 26 – Džore Držić, Croatian poet and playwright (born 1461)
