= 1506 in poetry =

List of years in poetry	(table)
- … 1496; 1497; 1498; 1499; 1500; 1501; 1502; 1503; 1504; 1505; 1506; 1507; 1508; 1509; 1510; 1511; 1512; 1513; 1514; 1515; 1516 …
- In literature 1503 1504 1505 1506 1507 1508 1509
- Art; Archaeology; Architecture; Literature; Music; Philosophy; Science; +...

Nationality words link to articles with information on the nation's poetry or literature (for instance, Irish or France).

== Events ==
- Ludovico Ariosto begins work on his Orlando Furioso

== Works published ==
- Publio Fausto Andrelini, Eclogues, full of proverbial expressions
- William Dunbar, The Dance of the Sevin Deidly Synnis, Scotland
- Stephen Hawes, The Passtyme of Pleasure (completed, approximate date), England
- Niccolò Machiavelli, The First Decade (Decennale primo), Italy

== Births ==
Death years link to the corresponding "[year] in poetry" article:

- February – George Buchanan (died 1582), Scottish historian, scholar, humanist and poet
- Approximate date – Hwang Jini (died c.1560), Korean poet

== Deaths ==
Birth years link to the corresponding "[year] in poetry" article:

- Mihri Hatun (born unknown), female Ottoman poet
- Johannes von Soest (born 1448), German composer, theorist and poet

== See also ==
- Poetry
- 16th century in poetry
- 16th century in literature
- French Renaissance literature
- Grands Rhétoriqueurs
- Renaissance literature
- Spanish Renaissance literature
