= 1574 in literature =

List of years in literature	(table)
- … 1564; 1565; 1566; 1567; 1568; 1569; 1570; 1571; 1572; 1573; 1574; 1575; 1576; 1577; 1578; 1579; 1580; 1581; 1582; 1583; 1584 …
- Art; Archaeology; Architecture; Literature; Music; Philosophy; Science; +...

This article contains information about the literary events and publications of 1574.

== Events ==
- unknown dates
  - Exercicio quotidiano, a religious manuscript in the Nahuatl language, is created.
  - The Russian printer Ivan Fyodorov prints the second edition of his Apostolos and the first Azbuka (alphabet book) in Cyrillic script.

== Prose ==
- Jean-Antoine de Baïf – Etrenes de poezie Franzoeze an vers mezures
- Matthias Flacius et al. – Magdeburg Centuries
- Nicolás Monardes – Historia medicinal de las cosas que se traen de nuestras Indias Occidentales
- Elizabeth Tyrwhitt – Morning and Evening Prayers

== Poetry ==
- See 1574 in poetry

== Births ==
- September – Thomas Gataker, English theologian (died 1654)
- September 18 – Claudio Achillini, Italian philosopher, theologian and poet (died 1640)
- November 4 – Erycius Puteanus, Dutch philologist (died 1646)
- Unknown dates
  - Richard Barnfield, English poet (died 1627)
  - Nicolas Coeffeteau, French theologian, poet and historian (died 1623)
  - John Day, English dramatist (died c. 1640)
  - Paul Laymann, Austrian moralist (died 1635)
  - Feng Menglong (馮夢龍), Chinese vernacular poet (died 1645)
  - William Percy, English poet and playwright (died 1648)

== Deaths ==
- January 30 – Damião de Góis, Portuguese humanist philosopher (born 1502)
- April 17 – Joachim Camerarius, German classical scholar (born 1500)
- June 27 – Giorgio Vasari, artist and biographer of artists (born 1511)
- November 7 – Solomon Luria, Jewish legal author (born 1510)
- November 28 – Georg Major, German Lutheran theologian (born 1502)
- December 10 – Ascanio Condivi, biographer of Michelangelo (born 1525)
- Unknown dates
  - Gáspár Heltai (Kaspar Helth), Transylvanian writer in German (born c. 1490)
  - Paulus Manutius, Venetian printer (born 1512)
  - Antonio Minturno, Italian poet and critic (born 1500)
  - Cornelio Musso, Italian orator and writer (born 1511)
  - Ioannes Sommerus, Saxon theologian (born 1542)
