= 1556 in literature =

List of years in literature	(table)
- … 1546; 1547; 1548; 1549; 1550; 1551; 1552; 1553; 1554; 1555; 1556; 1557; 1558; 1559; 1560; 1561; 1562; 1563; 1564; 1565; 1566 …
- Art; Archaeology; Architecture; Literature; Music; Philosophy; Science; +...

This article contains information about the literary events and publications of 1556.

== Events ==
- Unknown dates
  - The first printing press in India is introduced by Jesuits at Saint Paul's College, Goa.
  - The first written evidence of Yakshagana dance-drama is found on an inscription at the Lakshminarayana Temple, Hosaholalu in India.
  - Augustus, Elector of Saxony, establishes a royal state library in Dresden, predecessor of the Saxon State and University Library Dresden.

== New books ==
=== Prose ===
- Georg Bauer – De re metallica
- John Ponet – A Short Treasure of Politic Power

=== Poetry ===
- Pierre de Ronsard – Les Hymnes

== Births ==
- March 7 – Guillaume du Vair, French lawyer and philosopher (died 1621)
- April 27 – François Béroalde de Verville, French novelist and poet (died 1626)
- July 25 (baptised) – George Peele, English dramatist and poet (died 1596)
- August 10 – Philipp Nicolai, German poet and composer (died 1608)
- November 15 – Jacques Davy Duperron, French poet, cardinal and politician (died 1618)
- November 25 (baptised) – John Heminges, English actor and editor of the First Folio (died 1630)
- Unknown date – John Paul Nazarius, Italian theologian (died 1645)

== Deaths ==
- April 26 – Valentin Friedland, German scholar and teacher (born 1490)
- May 7 – Hieronymus Andreae, German printer and publisher (date of birth unknown)
- July 31 – Ignatius of Loyola, Spanish theologian, founder of the Jesuits (born 1491)
- October 21 – Pietro Aretino, Italian satirist (born 1492)
- October 31 – Johannes Sleidanus, Luxembourgeois historian (born 1506)
- November 14 – Giovanni della Casa, Florentine poet (born 1503)
- December 23 – Nicholas Udall, English dramatist (born 1504)
- Unknown dates
  - Fuzûlî, Ottoman poet and philosopher (born c.1483)
  - Oddur Gottskálksson, Icelandic translator (born 1514/1515)
