= 1511 in literature =

List of years in literature	(table)
- … 1501; 1502; 1503; 1504; 1505; 1506; 1507; 1508; 1509; 1510; 1511; 1512; 1513; 1514; 1515; 1516; 1517; 1518; 1519; 1520; 1521 …
- Art; Archaeology; Architecture; Literature; Music; Philosophy; Science; +...

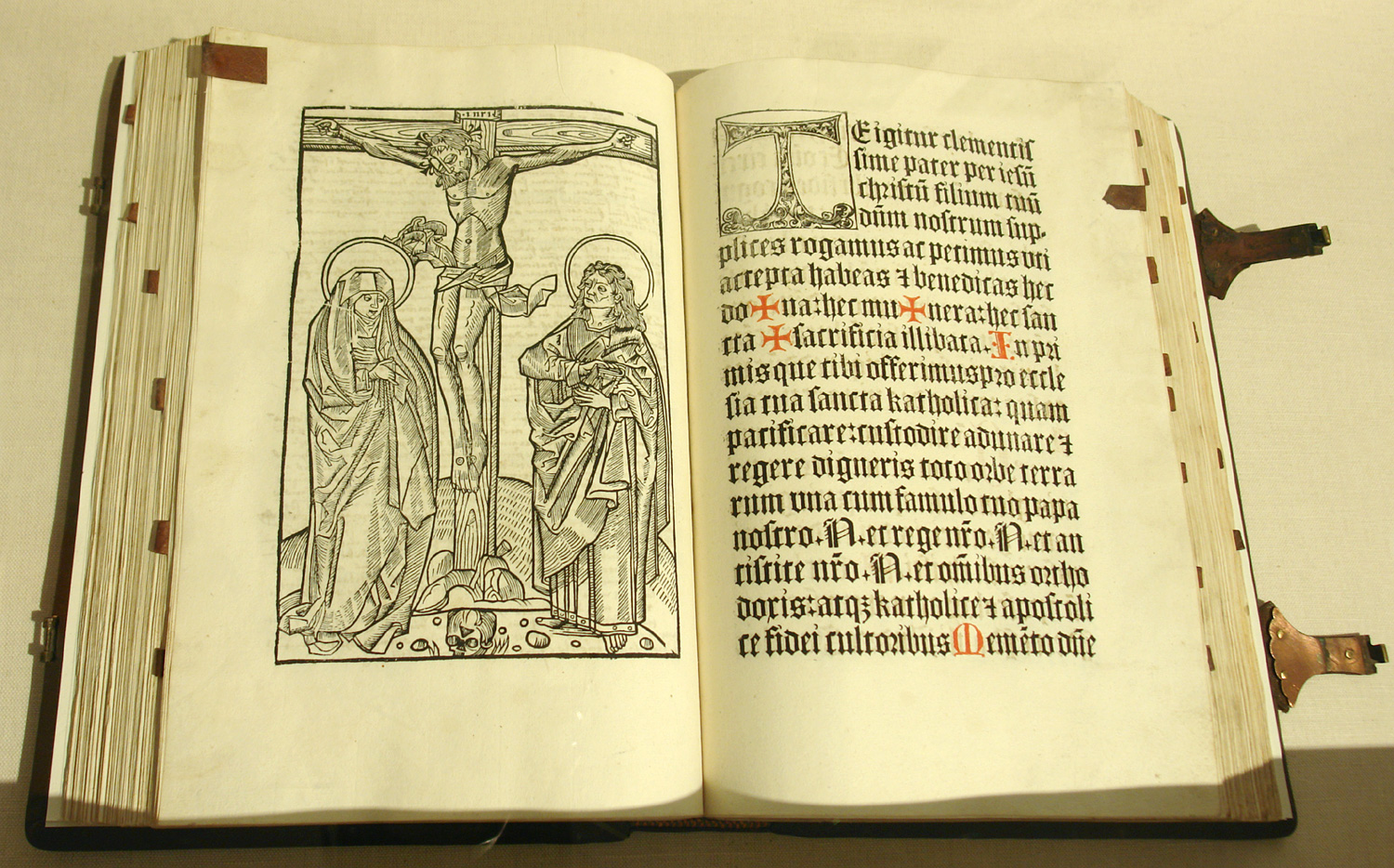
Bremen Cathedral Museum: Missale secundum ritum Bremense, printed by Renatus Beck, Strasbourg 1511. The missal is the oldest book in the collection of today's cathedral library.

This article contains information about the literary events and publications of 1511.

== Events ==
- probable – Ein kurtzweilig Lesen von Dyl Ulenspiegel, geboren uß dem Land zu Brunßwick, wie er sein Leben volbracht hat... is published by the printer Hans Grüninger in Strasbourg in Early New High German, either this year or in 1510. This is the first appearance of the trickster Till Eulenspiegel in print.

== New books ==
=== Prose ===
- The Demaũdes Joyous (joke book published by Wynkyn de Worde in English)
- Desiderius Erasmus – The Praise of Folly (Stultitiae Laus), written 1509

=== Poetry ===
- Jean Lemaire de Belges – La Concorde des deux langages
- John Lydgate (died c. 1451) – The Governance of Kings ("Secrets of the Old Philisoffres", translated from Aristotle's Secreta secretorum)
- Cancionero general (anthology of Spanish poetry published by Hernando del Castillo)

== Births ==
- November 15 – Johannes Secundus, Dutch poet writing in Latin (died 1536)

== Deaths ==
- unknown dates
  - Matthias Ringmann, German cartographer and humanist poet (born 1482)
  - Johannes Tinctoris (Jean de Vaerwere), Low Countries' composer, poet and writer on music, author of Diffinitorium musices, the first dictionary of musical terms (born c. 1435)
