= 1575 in literature =

List of years in literature	(table)
- … 1565; 1566; 1567; 1568; 1569; 1570; 1571; 1572; 1573; 1574; 1575; 1576; 1577; 1578; 1579; 1580; 1581; 1582; 1583; 1584; 1585 …
- Art; Archaeology; Architecture; Literature; Music; Philosophy; Science; +...

This article contains information about the literary events and publications of 1575.

== Events ==
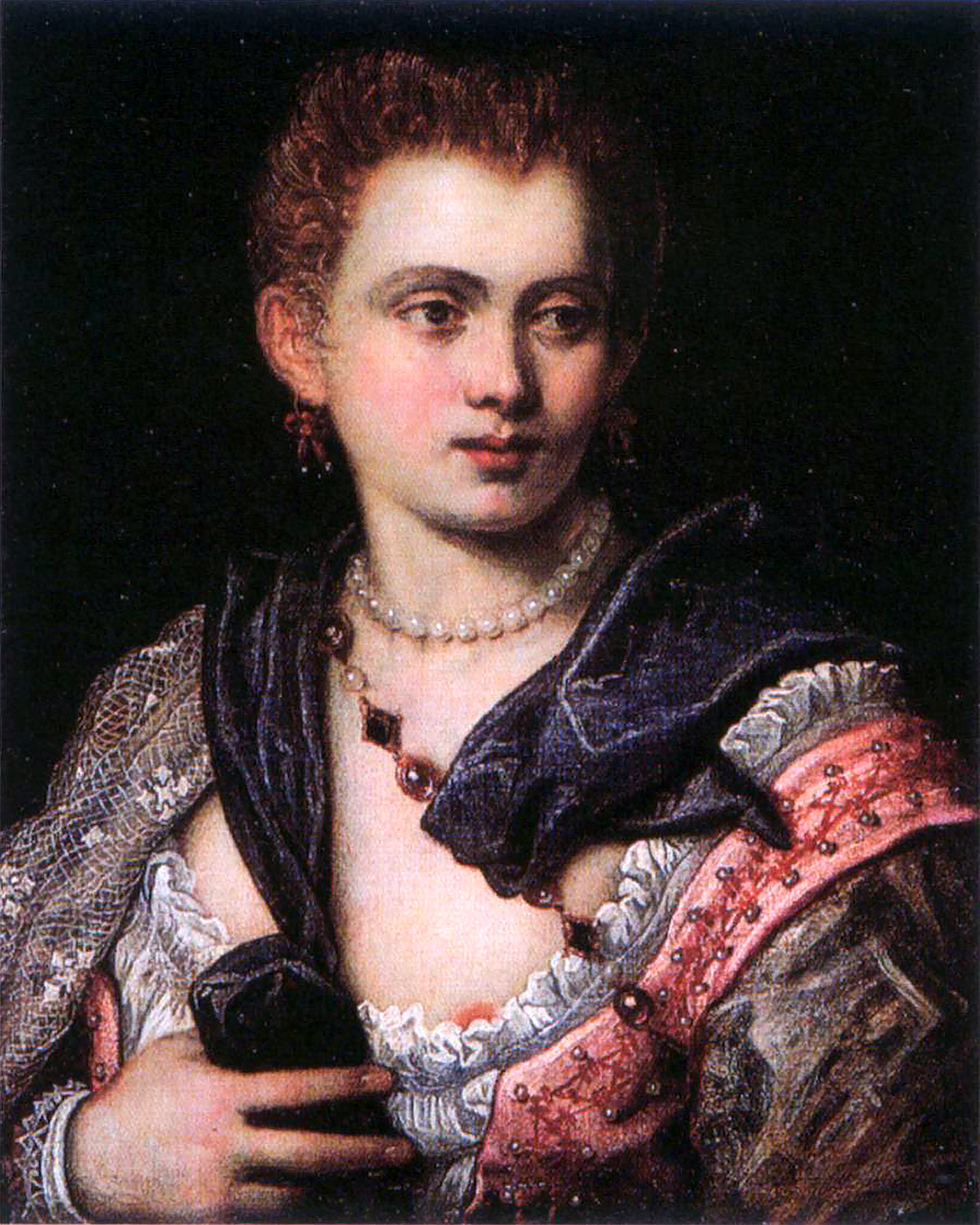
Venetian poet and courtesan Veronica Franco painted in the style of Tintoretto c.1575

- July – Sir Philip Sidney meets Penelope Devereux, the inspiration for his Astrophel and Stella.
- September 26 – Miguel de Cervantes is captured by Barbary pirates.
- unknown date
  - The first primer in the Estonian language is published.
  - First printed version of Don Juan Manuel's Tales of Count Lucanor appears. It was originally written in 1335.

== New books ==
=== Prose ===
- Anonymous – Arbatel de magia veterum
- Ulpian Fulwell – The Flower of Fame (appendices in verse)

=== Drama ===
- George Gascoigne – The Glass of Government

=== Poetry ===
- Veronica Franco – Terze rime

== Births ==
- April – Jakob Böhme, German theologian (died 1624)
- August 14 – Robert Hayman, Newfoundland poet (died 1624)
- August 15 – Bartol Kašić, Croatian linguist (died 1650)
- Unknown dates
  - David Calderwood, Scottish historian (died 1650)
  - John Cotta, English physician and writer (died 1650)
  - Giovanni Stefano Menochio, Italian Jesuit scholar (died 1655)
  - Cyril Tourneur, English dramatist (died 1626)
  - William Vaughan, Welsh writer and colonist (died 1641)

== Deaths ==
- March 11 – Matthias Flacius, Croatian theologian writing in Latin (born 1520)
- June 9 – Paulus Aemilius, Hebrew bibliographer and publisher
- July 14 – Richard Taverner, English Bible translator (born c. 1505)
- August 14 – Diego Hurtado de Mendoza, Spanish novelist and poet (born 1503)
- September 17 – Heinrich Bullinger, Swiss theologian (born 1504)
- December 1 – Diogo de Paiva de Andrada, Portuguese theologian (born 1528)
- December 18 – Marcin Bielski, Polish chronicler and poet (born 1495)
- unknown dates
  - Sir William Stevenson, English poet (born 1530)
  - Isabel de Josa, Catalan writer (born 1508)
