= 1568 in literature =

List of years in literature	(table)
- … 1558; 1559; 1560; 1561; 1562; 1563; 1564; 1565; 1566; 1567; 1568; 1569; 1570; 1571; 1572; 1573; 1574; 1575; 1576; 1577; 1578 …
- Art; Archaeology; Architecture; Literature; Music; Philosophy; Science; +...

This article contains information about the literary events and publications of 1568.

== Events ==
- October – The Bishops' Bible (inscribed The Holie Bible) is published as a translation into English made under the authority of the Church of England.

== New books ==
=== Prose ===
- Wawrzyniec Grzymała Goślicki – De optimo senatore
- Petar Hektorović – Ribanje i ribarsko prigovaranje (Discourse on Fishing and Fishermen)
- Hans Sachs and Jost Amman (illustrations) – Das Ständebuch (Book of Trades)
- William Turner
  - Of Sage
  - A New Boke on the Natures and Properties of all Wines
- Giorgio Vasari – Le Vite delle più eccellenti pittori, scultori, ed architettori (Lives of the Most Excellent Painters, Sculptors, and Architects; revised edition)
- Christopher Watson (translator) – The hystories of the most famous and worthy chronographer Polybius

=== Children ===
- Niels Bredal – The Child's Mirror (in Danish)

=== Drama ===
- Ulpian Fulwell – Like Will to Like
- William Wager – The Longer Thou Livest, The More Foole Thou Art

=== Poetry ===
- François d'Amboise – Élégie sur le trépas d'Anne de Montmorency
- See also 1568 in poetry

== Births ==
- January 20 – Daniel Cramer, German Lutheran theologian (died 1637)
- February 11 – Honoré d'Urfé, French novelist (died 1625)
- March 30 – Henry Wotton, English diplomat and author (died 1639)
- July 7 – Richard Burbage, English actor and theater owner (died 1619)
- September 5 – Tommaso Campanella, Italian philosopher and poet (died 1639)
- Unknown date – Richard Baker, English chronicler (died 1645)

== Deaths ==
- April 7 – Onofrio Panvinio, Italian historian (born 1529)
- September 14 – Jan van Casembroot, Flemish humanist poet (executed, born c. 1525)
- December 23 – Roger Ascham, English didact (born c. 1515)
- Unknown dates
  - Antoine Héroet, French poet
  - Garcia de Orta, Portuguese Jewish physician, naturalist, and medical writer (born 1501/2)
  - Dirk Philips, Frisian Anabaptist theologian (born 1504)
