= Edward Ferrers =

Edward Ferrers may refer to:

- Edward Ferrers (dramatist) (died 1564), English dramatist
- Edward Ferrers (MP died 1639) (c. 1573–1639), MP for Tewkesbury, 1610–1611
- Edward Bromfield Ferrers, Commander of the Ceylon Defence Force
- Edward Ferrers (died 1535), MP for Warwickshire
- Edward Ferrers (died 1564), MP for Warwick
- George Ferrers (c. 1510–1579), or Edward Ferrers, courtier and writer
