= 1536 in literature =

This article contains information about the literary events and publications of 1536.

== Events ==
- unknown dates
  - Petar Zoranić writes the first Croatian novel, the pastoral-allegorical Planine ("Mountains"); it is first published posthumously in Venice in 1569.
  - The first Helvetic Confession is drawn up, in Latin, by Heinrich Bullinger and Leo Jud of Zürich, Kaspar Megander of Bern, Oswald Myconius and Simon Grynaeus of Basel, Martin Bucer and Wolfgang Capito of Strasbourg, with other representatives from Schaffhausen, St Gall, Mülhausen and Biel.

== New books ==
- John Calvin – Institutes of the Christian Religion (in Latin)
- Sir Thomas Elyot – The Castel of Helth
- Wessel Gansfort – Sum of Christianity (English translation)
- Paracelsus – Die große Wundarzney

== Poetry ==
- Aonio Paleario – De immortalitate animarum

== Births ==
- February 2 – Piotr Skarga (Piotr Powęski), Polish hagiographer (died 1612 )
- May 13 – Jacobus Pamelius, Flemish theologian (died 1587)

== Deaths ==
- March 1 – Bernardo Accolti, Italian poet
- c. July – John Rastell, English printer and author (born c. 1475)
- July 12 – Erasmus, Dutch-born Renaissance humanist scholar (born 1466)
- September 25 – Johannes Secundus, Dutch poet writing in Latin (born 1511)
- October 14 – Garcilaso de la Vega, Spanish soldier and poet (born c.1501)
- date unknown – Merten de Keyser, French printer and publisher working in Antwerp
