= 1650 in literature =

This article contains information about the literary events and publications of 1650.

== Events ==
- February 22 – Parliament appoints a commission for the propagation and preaching of the gospel in Wales, advised by Vavasor Powell. The Act for the better propagation and preaching of the Gospel in Wales is passed by Parliament, resulting in the ejection of dissident clergymen and creating English-language schools.
- November – Blaise Pascal and his family return to Paris, after an 18-month retreat to Clermont-Ferrand.
- unknown dates
  - Despite the official prohibition against stage plays in England, theatrical manager and promoter William Beeston finances repairs to the Cockpit Theatre and attempts to assemble and train a company of young actors. His effort is unsuccessful.
  - Under this year's Blasphemy Act, English radical Jacob Bauthumley is arrested, convicted and has his tongue pierced on account of his book The Light and Dark Sides of God.
  - Robert Baron publishes his plagiarized work Pocula Castalia, stealing mainly from the minor poems of John Milton issued in 1645.
  - At about this date Agneta Horn writes her autobiography, Agneta Horns leverne, in Swedish; it will not be discovered until 1885.

== New books ==
=== Prose ===
- Elias Ashmole (translating Arthur Dee's book from Latin to English)– Fasciculus Chemicus
- Richard Flecknoe – The Idea of His Highness Oliver ...
- Thomas Fuller - A Pisgah-Sight of Palestine and the confines thereof; with the history of the Old and New Testaments acted thereon
- Jonas Moore – Moores Arithmetick
- Robert Parker - An exposition of the powring out of the fourth vial mentioned in the sixteenth of the Revelation by Master Robert Parker... (posthumous)
- Vavasor Powell - Christ and Moses Excellency
- Francisco de Quevedo – La hora de todos y la fortuna con seso
- George Walker – Anglo-Tyrannus

=== Drama ===
- François le Métel de Boisrobert – La Jalouse d'elle-même
- Abraham Cowley – The Guardian
- Francisco de Rojas Zorrilla – Del rey abajo, ninguno

== Poetry ==
- Anne Bradstreet – The Tenth Muse Lately Sprung Up in America
- Andrew Marvell – An Horatian Ode upon Cromwell's Return from Ireland
- Francisco de Trillo y Figueroa – Panegírico y natalicio al marqués de Montalbán
- Henry Vaughan – Silex scintillans (part 1)

== Births ==
- June 14 – Carlo Alessandro Guidi, Italian lyric poet (died 1712)
- July – Charles Leslie, Irish theologian (died 1722)
- September 23 – Bishop Jeremy Collier, English theologian and theatre critic (died 1726)
- Unknown dates
  - Madame d'Aulnoy, French writer of fairy tales (died 1705)
  - Henry Scougal, Scottish theologian (died 1678)

== Deaths ==
- February 11 – René Descartes, French philosopher (born 1596)
- April 22 – Stephanius, Danish royal historiographer (born 1599)
- May 27 – Anthony Ascham, English political theorist (born c. 1614)
- June – Jean Rotrou, French poet and dramatist (born 1609)
- June 30 – Niccolò Cabeo, Italian philosopher (born 1586)
- August 25 – Richard Crashaw, English poet (born c. 1613)
- September 17 – Constantino Cajetan, Italian scholar and book collector (born 1560)
- October 25 – Franciscus Quaresmius, Milanese Franciscan writer (born 1583)
- November 13 – Thomas May, English poet and historian (born 1595)
- December 28 – Bartol Kašić, Croatian linguist and grammarian (born 1575)
- Unknown dates
  - Balthazar Baro, French poet, dramatist and romance-writer (born 1596)
  - İbrahim Peçevi, Ottoman historian (born 1572)
  - Tukaram, Hindu poet
