= 1564 in literature =

This article contains information about the literary events and publications of 1564.

== Events ==
- January – János Zsámboky (Johannes Sambucus) completes the preface to his Emblemata.
- February 6 – John Calvin, in the throes of his final illness, preaches his last sermon, in Geneva.
- March 1 – Ivan Fyodorov with Pyotr Mstislavets prints the Acts and Epistles of the Apostles (an Apostolos), the first printed work in the Russian language that can be dated, at the Moscow Print Yard.
- unknown dates
  - A revised edition of the Index Librorum Prohibitorum, authorised by the Council of Trent, is printed in Venice.
  - A chained library (librije) with access for the public is attached to the church of St. Walburgis in Zutphen, Netherlands. It will still be extant with its original fittings in the 21st century.

== New books ==
=== Prose ===
- William Allen - Certain Brief Reasons concerning the Catholick Faith
- John Dee – Monas Hieroglyphica
- Magdeburger Centurien (Magdeburg Centuries), volumes VII and VIII
- Girolamo Maggi – Miscellanorum, seu Variarum Lectionum
- Johann Weyer - De scorbuto epitome

=== Drama ===
- Vishnu Varamballi – Virata Parva (earliest copy)

=== Poetry ===
- See 1564 in poetry

== Births ==
- February 26 (baptised) – Christopher Marlowe, English dramatist and poet (died 1593)
- March 9 – David Fabricius, German theologian (died 1617)
- March 20 – Thomas Morton, English polemicist and bishop (died 1659)
- April 26 (baptism, traditional date of birth April 23) – William Shakespeare, English dramatist and poet (died 1616)
- Unknown dates
  - Jean D'Espagnet, French lawyer, politician and author (died c. 1637)
  - Kryštof Harant, Czech nobleman, traveller, humanist, soldier, writer and composer (died 1621)
  - Henry Reynolds, English poet, schoolmaster and literary critic (died 1632)
  - Juan de Aguilar Villaquirán, Spanish writer and translator (died 1618)
- Probable birth year – Henry Chettle, English dramatist and pamphleteer (died c. 1607)

== Deaths ==
- March 5 – Friedrich Staphylus, German theologian (born 1512)
- March 27 – Lütfi Pasha, Albanian-born Ottoman statesman, juridical scholar and poet of slave origin (b. c. 1488)
- April – Pierre Belon, French naturalist and travel writer (murdered, born 1517)
- April 1 – Christoph Froschauer, Swiss printer (plague, born c. 1490)
- April 9 – Georg Hartmann, German humanist engineer, author and printer (born 1489)
- May 2 – Cardinal Rodolfo Pio da Carpi, Italian humanist and patron of the arts (born 1500)
- May 27 – John Calvin, French-born theologian (born 1509)
- August 11 – Edward Ferrers, credited as an English dramatist (unknown date of birth)
- September 26 – Theodor Bibliander, German theologian and publisher (plague, born c. 1505)
  - Argula von Grumbach, German Protestant reformer (b. 1490)
