= 1625 in literature =

This article contains information about the literary events and publications of 1625.

== Events ==
- January 1 – The King's Men act Henry IV, Part 1 (described as The First Part of Sir John Falstaff ) at Whitehall Palace.
- January 9 – Ben Jonson's masque The Fortunate Isles and Their Union (designed by Inigo Jones) is played before the English Court in London, becoming the last of the Jacobean era.
- February 12 – John Milton enters Christ's College, Cambridge, aged 16.
- March 27 – On the death of King James VI of Scotland and I of England and Ireland, patron of the King James Bible and essayist, he is succeeded by his son, the Prince of Wales. At the same time, theatres are closed because of an outbreak of plague and do not reopen until December.
- April – Sir Richard Baker's Oxfordshire property is seized as a result of debts.
- August 2–September 26 – Playwright Cyril Tourneur becomes secretary to the Council of War. On October 8 he joins the catastrophic Cádiz expedition in another secretarial post under Sir Edward Cecil and on December 11 is put ashore from the returning fleet at Kinsale in Ireland, terminally ill.
- December – After the closure of the London public theatres for most of the year due to an outbreak of bubonic plague, a new company, Queen Henrietta's Men, is formed under the patronage of the new queen (whom Charles I had married in May 1625), and gives its first performances at the Cockpit Theatre. It replaces the dormant Queen Elizabeth's Men.

== New books ==
=== Prose ===
- Andrea Alciato - Rerum Patriae, seu Historiae Mediolanensis, Libri IV
- Francis Bacon – Complete Essays
- Alonso de Castillo Solórzano – Tardes entretenidas
- Hugo Grotius – De jure belli ac pacis
- Musaeum Hermeticum
- Samuel Purchas – Hakluytus Posthumus, or Purchas his Pilgrimes
- Ludovico Zuccolo – La Repubblica d' Evandria

=== Drama ===
- John Fletcher and Philip Massinger – The Elder Brother
- Alexandre Hardy – Mariamne (published)
- Ben Jonson
  - The Staple of News
  - The Fortunate Isles and Their Union
- Honorat de Bueil, seigneur de Racan – Les bergeries
- James Shirley – Love Tricks, or the School of Complement
- Joost van den Vondel – Palamedes

=== Poetry ===
- Honoré d'Urfé – Sylvanire

== Births ==
- May 25
  - John Davies, Welsh translator into English (died 1693)
  - Ann, Lady Fanshawe, English memoirist (died 1680)
- June 23 – John Fell, English academic and bishop (died 1686)
- August 20 – Thomas Corneille, French dramatist (died 1709)
- unknown date – François Bernier, French travel writer and physician (died 1688)

== Deaths ==
- January 29 – Jacob Gretser, German Jesuit writer (born 1562)
- March 25 – Giambattista Marino, Italian epic poet (born 1569)
- March 27 – King James VI of Scotland and I of England and Ireland, Scottish literary patron (born 1566)
- June 1 – Honoré d'Urfé, French novelist and miscellanist (born 1568)
- August 29 (burial) – John Fletcher, English dramatist (born 1579)
- September – Thomas Lodge, English dramatist and physician (born c. 1558)
- September 6 – Thomas Dempster, Scottish historian (born 1579)
- September 20 – Heinrich Meibom, German poet and historian (born 1555)
- c. October – John Florio, English linguist and lexicographer (born 1553)
- November 27 – John Cameron, Scottish theologian (born c. 1579)
