= 1645 in literature =

List of years in literature	(table)
- … 1635; 1636; 1637; 1638; 1639; 1640; 1641; 1642; 1643; 1644; 1645; 1646; 1647; 1648; 1649; 1650; 1651; 1652; 1653; 1654; 1655 …
- Art; Archaeology; Architecture; Literature; Music; Philosophy; Science; +...

This article contains information about the literary events and publications of 1645.

== Events ==
- December – William Cavendish, later Duke of Newcastle, marries Margaret Lucas, whom he has met while himself in exile in France.
- unknown dates
  - With the London theatres closed by the Puritan regime during the English Civil War, closet drama grows in prominence. Henry Burkhead's Cola's Fury, or Lirenda's Misery is written in this genre and the sisters Jane Cavendish and Elizabeth Egerton probably complete their The Concealed Fansyes while besieged.

== New books ==
=== Prose ===
- Edward Herbert, 1st Baron Herbert of Cherbury
  - De Causis Errorum (On the Causes of Errors)
  - De Religione Laici (On the Religion of the Laity)
- John Milton
  - Colasterion
  - Tetrachordon
- Elizabeth Richardson, Baroness Cramond – A Lady's Legacy to her Daughters
- Alexander Ross
  - Medicus Medicatus
  - The Philosophical Touchstone
- Francisco Manuel de Melo – Guerra de Cataluña
- Horacio Carochi – Arte de la lengua mexicana
- Daniello Bartoli – L'huomo di lettere
- Hermann Busenbaum – Medulla theologiae moralis

=== Drama ===
- Luis Quiñones de Benavente – Jocoseria. Burlas veras, o reprensión moral y festiva de los desórdenes públicos
- Molière – Le Médecin volant
- Paul Scarron – Jodelet

=== Poetry ===
- John Milton – Poems of Mr. John Milton, Both English and Latin, compos'd at several times (dated this year, published early 1646)
- Sheikh Muhammad – Yoga-samgrama
- Edmund Waller – Poems

== Births ==
- August 14 – Carlos de Sigüenza y Góngora, Mexican priest, poet, geographer, and historian (died 1700)
- August 16 or 17 – Jean de La Bruyère, French essayist (died 1696)
- Unknown date – Edmund Bohun, English historian, publicist and political writer (died 1699)

== Deaths ==
- April 17 – Daniel Featley, English Calvinist theologian (born 1582)
- August 28 – Hugo Grotius, Dutch polymath (born 1583)
- August 31 – Francesco Bracciolini, Italian poet (born 1566)
- September 8 – Francisco de Quevedo, Spanish nobleman, politician and poet (born 1580)
- Unknown dates
  - Feng Menglong (馮夢龍), Chinese vernacular poet and author (born 1574)
  - William Lithgow, Scottish travel writer (born 1582)
  - John Paul Nazarius, Italian Dominican theologian (born 1556)
