= Robert Baron (poet) =

English poet and dramatist

Robert Baron (born c. 1630) was an English poet and dramatist. He was a very successful plagiarist, his thefts passing unrecognised for more than a century after his death.

== Life ==
According to Gerard Langbaine, Baron was born in 1630, and educated at Caius College, Cambridge, although there is no evidence that he took a degree. After 1650, Baron disappeared, and nothing more was heard concerning him.

== Works ==
Baron's first printed work, "Eροτοπαιγνιον [Erotopaignion], or the Cyprian Academy," is dated from "my chambers in Gray's Inn, 1 April 1647." It is dedicated to James Howell, the well-known author of "Epistolæ Ho-Elianæ," who was perhaps his uncle. Howell in turn prefixed some verses to Baron's Pocula Castalia, published in 1801. Whole passages of the "Cyprian Academy" and of Baron's other works are taken, scarcely altered, from the 1645 Poems of John Milton, who was little-known at that time. An exposure of the plagiarism is given in Thomas Warton's edition of Milton's minor poems, and is amplified in the sixth volume of the booksellers' edition of Milton's works, published in 1801.

Baron's best known work is a tragedy, entitled Mirza, said on the title-page to have been really acted in Persia in the last age. In an address to the reader, Baron acknowledges that the story is the same as that of Sir John Denham's Sophy, but adds: "I had finished three compleat acts of this tragedy before I saw that, nor was I then discouraged from proceeding." It is without date, but is dedicated to the king, whence probably it was not later than 1648. Denham's Sophy, meanwhile, first saw the light in 1642. Warton says that Mirza is a copy of Ben Jonson's Catiline, which seems not quite just. John Genest gives an analysis of the story. There are one or two good and eminently dramatic lines in Mirza, which as yet have not been traced to any other writer. More than one hundred pages of annotation are supplied by the author, thus swelling the book out to two hundred and sixty-four pages.

Pocula Castalia was published in 1650. In 1649 appeared "Apologie for Paris for rejecting of Juno and Pallas and presenting of Ate's Golden Ball to Venus." Gerard Langbaine, who anticipates Warton's assertion with regard to the resemblance between Mirza and Catiline, quotes passages from both which have a certain measure of resemblance, but scarcely support a charge stronger than imitation. He also states that Baron "is the first author taken notice of by Phillips in his Theatrum Poetarum, or his transcriber, Mr. Winstanley, in his Lives of the English Poets; and though neither of them give any other account of our author but what they collected from my former catalogue, printed 1680, yet, through a mistake in the method of that catalogue, they have ascrib'd many anonymous plays to the foregoing writers, which belonged not to them." The complaint is justified, since many attributions to Baron are mistaken.
