= Johannes Tolhopff =

Johannes Tolhopff (c.1445—1450 – 26 April 1503) was a German astrologist, who worked for Mathias Corvinus, king of Hungary.

== Biography ==
Tolhopff was born in Kemnath and educated in Leipzig, where later he became a professor. His most influential teacher was his astronomy professor in 1466-1467, Regiomontanus. In 1471 he moved to the newly founded university to Ingolstadt where between 1473 and 1475 he was the Dean of the institution.

He was the astrologist of Mathias Corvinus after his professor, Regiomontanus.

He offered one of his greatest works, called Stellarium to the ruler of Hungary. It became part of the Bibliotheca Corviniana. Mathias made him a noble man. In Later on he left Hungary and moved to Regensburg, where he died in 1503.

== Sources ==
- Gazda István: Kuriózumok a magyar művelődés történetéből, Kossuth Könyvkiadó, 1990
