= Basilio Zanchi =

Italian humanist and scholar (1501–1558)

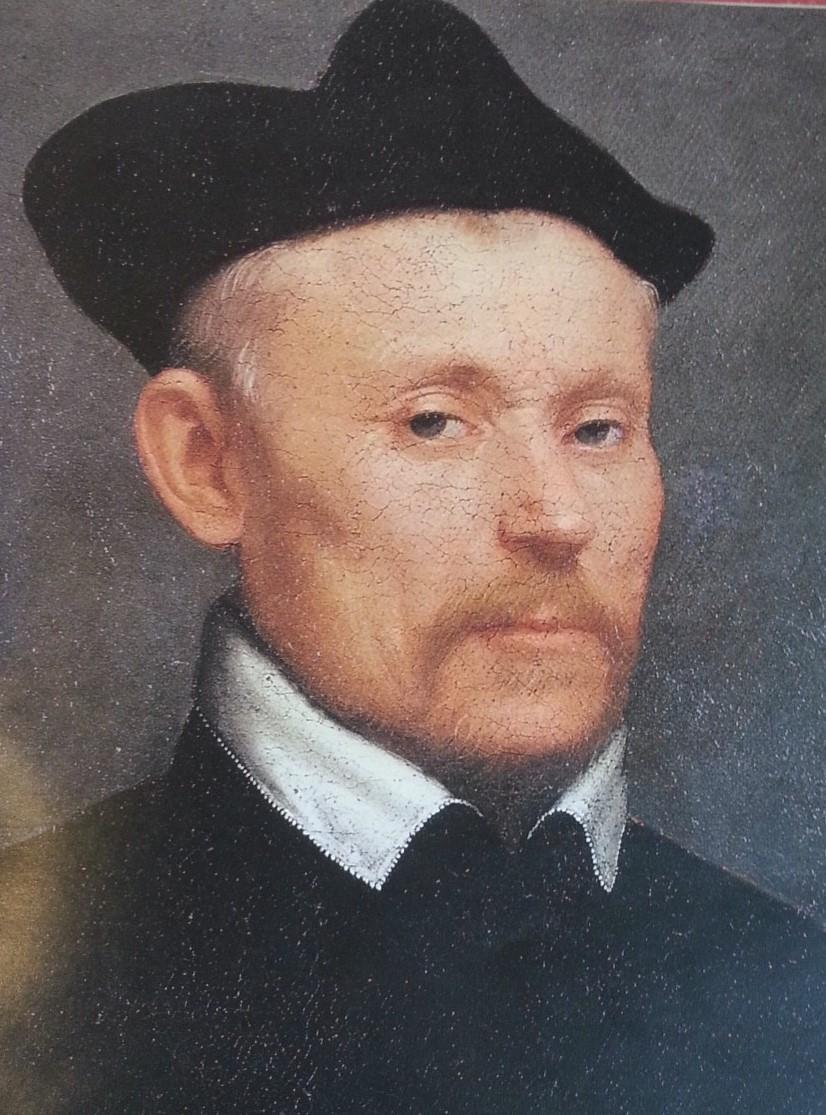
- Giovanni Battista Moroni. Portrait of Basilio Zanchi
- Born: 1501; Bergamo
- Died: 1558 (aged 56–57); Rome
- Occupation: Librarian, Renaissance humanist
- Relatives: Giovanni Crisostomo Zanchi

Basilio Zanchi (c. 1501 – 1558) was a 16th-century Italian humanist and scholar.

Zanchi was born in Bergamo. He wrote his poetry in Latin and was a canon in Letran and later a Vatican librarian.

He was imprisoned in Rome because he disobeyed the Pope Paul VI, probably because he accepted some Protestantism theories. He died at Castel Sant'Angelo.

== Works ==
- De Horto Sophiæ, 1540
- Poematum libri VIII, 1550
- Verborum latinorum ex variis auctoribus Epitome, 1541
- Dictionarium poeticum, 1542
- In divinos libros Notationes, 1556.

== Sources ==
- Bouillet, Marie-Nicolas; Chassang, Alexis, eds. (1878). "Basile Zanchi". Dictionnaire Bouillet (in French).
- Basilio Zanchi entry (in Italian) by Luigi Fassò in the Enciclopedia Treccani, 1937
