= Juan de Aguilar Villaquirán =

Spanish writer and translator

Juan de Aguilar Villaquirán (1564–1618) was a Spanish writer and translator born in Toledo, Spain. He was the son of the doctor Escalona Alonso Hernández de Aguilar.
