= 1553 in literature =

This article contains information about the literary events and publications of 1553.

== Events ==
- Early – William Baldwin writes Beware the Cat (first published 1561), an early example of extended fiction (and specifically of horror fiction) in English and including an account of a printing house with which the author is familiar.
- unknown dates
  - The xiii Bukes of Eneados of the famose Poete Virgill appears in London as the first published complete translation of any major work of classical antiquity into one of the English languages, based posthumously on Gavin Douglas's Eneados, a translation of Virgil's Aeneid from Latin into Middle Scots completed in 1513.
  - Construction of the Biblioteca Marciana in Venice is completed to the design of Jacopo Sansovino.

== New books ==
=== Prose ===
- Francesco Patrizi – La Città felice (The Happy City)
- Guillaume Rouillé – Promptuarium Iconum Insigniorum

=== Drama ===
- António Ferreira – Bristo
- Approximate year
  - Nicholas Udall – Respublica (probable author)
  - Mr. S. – Gammer Gurton's Needle

=== Poetry ===
- See 1553 in poetry

== Births ==
- March 29 – Vitsentzos Kornaros, Cretan poet (died 1613 or 1614)
- October 8 – Jacques Auguste de Thou, French historian (died 1617)
- c. December – John Chamberlain, English correspondent (died 1628)
- Unknown dates
  - John Florio, English lexicographer (died 1625)
  - Richard Hakluyt, English travel writer (died 1616)
  - George Wyatt, English biographer of Anne Boleyn (died 1624)

== Deaths ==
- March 17 – Girolamo Fracastoro, Italian scholar and poet (born 1478) (executed)
- April 9 – François Rabelais, French writer and satirist (born c. 1494)
- May 28 – Johannes Aal, Swiss theologian and dramatist (born c. 1500)
- October 27 – Michael Servetus, Spanish theologian and humanist (born 1511) (executed)
- December 14 – Hanibal Lucić, Croatian poet and playwright (born c. 1485)
- unknown date – Yamazaki Sōkan, Japanese poet (born 1465)
