= Primer of Claude of France =

16th century manuscript

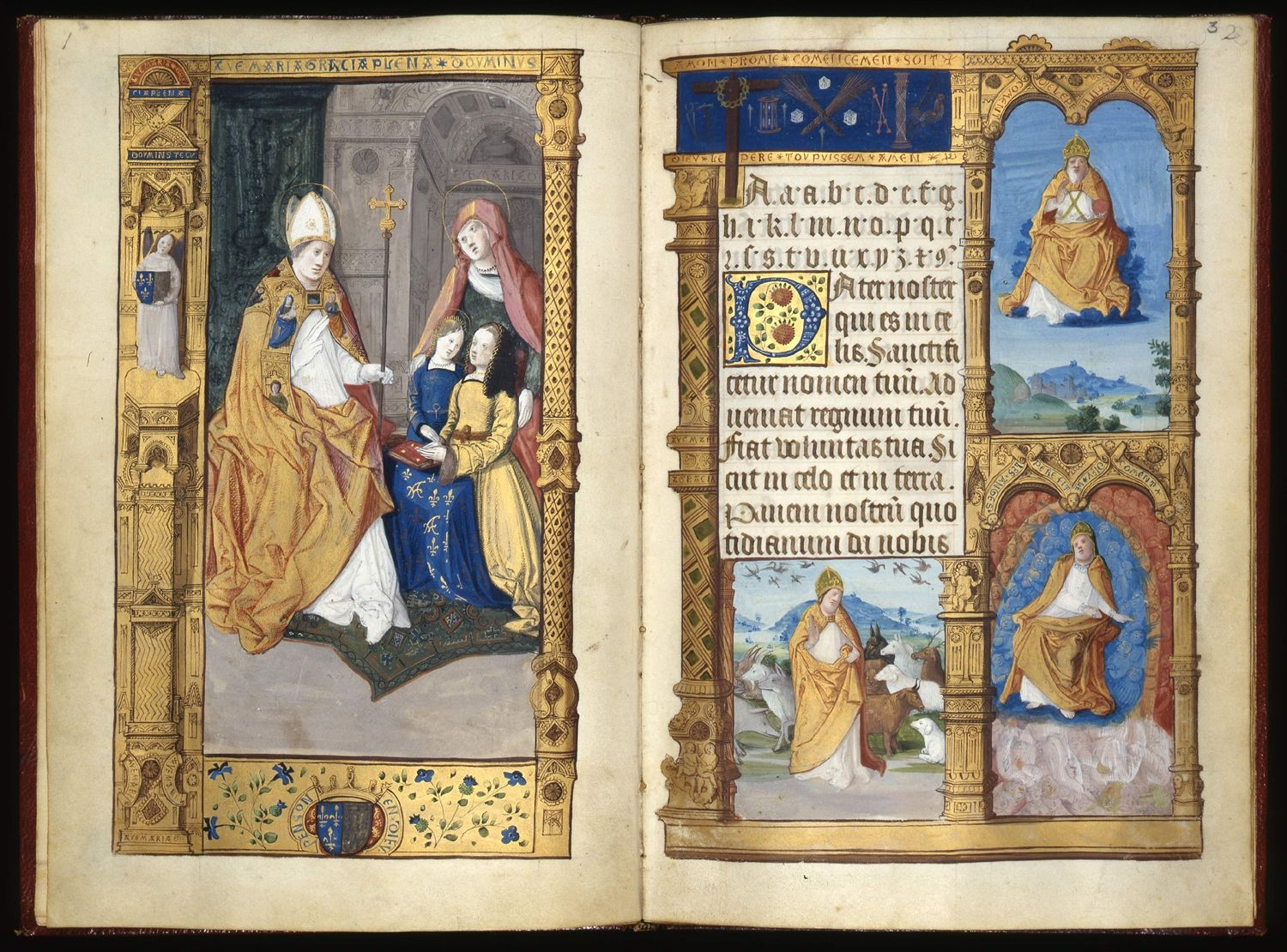
Folio 2v (left) shows Saint Anne presenting a young Virgin Mary and Anne of Brittany to her patron saint Claude. Folio 3r (right) depicts God creating Heaven and Earth, angels, animals and birds. The dark blue panel (upper left) shows the Instruments of Christ's Passion, below is an alphabet which is followed by the Pater Noster.

The Primer of Claude of France was the first book owned by the French princess Claude of France, eldest daughter of Louis XII of France and Anne of Brittany. Commissioned by Anne for Claude and produced in c. 1505, it is a rare surviving example of a manuscript designed for a medieval child.

The book measures 26 cm by 17.5 cm, and its 14 pages contain the text of the canonical hours shortened and simplified as a devotional elementary reading book or primer, along with two full-page miniature paintings – the first showing Claude kneeling before her patron saint Claudius of Besançon, with Saint Anne and the Virgin Mary in the right background, the second showing St Claudius presenting Claude to Saint Anne and the Virgin Mary – and 37 smaller miniatures. It is now held by the Fitzwilliam Museum in Cambridge as MS 159.

The "loose brushwork and relatively pale palette" and use of gilded frames of gothic architecture are typical of the Master of Antoine de Roche, who is tentatively identified with Guido Mazzoni of Modena (d. 1518).

== See also ==
- Grandes Heures of Anne of Brittany
