= Exercicio quotidiano =

The Exercicio quotidiano (older Spanish for "daily exercise"; modern spelling Ejercicio cotidiano, pronounced [exeɾˈsisjo kotiˈðjano]) is a Nahuatl-language Christian religious manuscript, consisting of daily meditations with Latin passages taken from the New Testament.

The manuscript was originally composed in 1574, and is attributed to the Franciscan missionary Bernardino de Sahagún. However, it is unlikely that he wrote it personally, as by this time he had hand tremors that made it difficult for him to write. The extant manuscript of the Exercicio, currently in the Newberry Library, Chicago, Illinois, is not the original but a copy made by the 17th century Nahua scribe Chimalpahin, who may have altered the text somewhat.

The Exercicio has been translated into both Spanish and English by Arthur J. O. Anderson. The Spanish version was published in 1993 in Adiciones, apéndice a la postilla y ejercicio cotidiano (ISBN 968-36-2364-6), while the English version was published in 1997 in volume 2 of the Codex Chimalpahin series (ISBN 0-8061-2950-6).
