= 1559 in literature =

This article contains information about the literary events and publications of 1559.

== Events ==
- April – The Act of Uniformity sets the order of prayer in accordance with a new version of the Book of Common Prayer.
- Before August – Pope Paul IV promulgates the Pauline Index, an early version of the Index Librorum Prohibitorum.

== New books ==
=== Prose ===
- Andrea Alciato - De formula Romani Imperii
- Jacques Amyot (translator)
  - Daphnis et Chloë, from Longus' Daphnis and Chloe
  - Vies des hommes illustres, from Plutarch's Parallel Lives (begins)
- Joachim du Bellay – Discours au roi
- Realdo Colombo – De Re Anatomica
- Jorge de Montemayor – Diana
- Die Magdeburger Centurien (Magdeburg Centuries, first three volumes, publication continues up to 1574)

=== Drama ===
- Jasper Heywood – Translation of Seneca the Younger's Troas

=== Poetry ===
- See 1559 in poetry

== Births ==
- February 18 – Isaac Casaubon, Genevan classicist and church historian (died 1614)
- October 12 – Jacques Sirmond, Jesuit scholar (died 1651)
- December – Lupercio Leonardo de Argensola, dramatist and poet (died 1613)
- unknown dates
  - Luis Cabrera de Córdoba, Spanish historian (died 1623)
  - Christopher Holywood, Jesuit writer (died 1626)
  - John Penry, Protestant pamphleteer and martyr (died 1593)

== Deaths ==
- January – Steven Mierdman, printer (born c. 1510)
- May 19 – Pierre Doré, theologian (born c. 1500)
- August 15 – Luigi Lippomano, hagiographer (born 1500)
- August 25 – Nicholas Tacitus Zegers, Bible exegete (born c. 1495)
- September 7 – Robert Estienne, printer (born 1503)
- Probable year of death – Sebastián Fox Morcillo, philosopher
