= Edward Ferrers (dramatist) =

Edward Ferrers (died 1564) is described by Anthony Wood as a distinguished English dramatist during the reign of King Edward VI. This characterisation is no longer accepted.

Wood suggests, without advancing any proof, that he was educated at Oxford. His name does not appear on the register. We know that one Edward Ferrers of Baddesley Clinton, Warwickshire, died 11 August 1564. He was the son of Henry Ferrers (d. 1526), married in 1548 Bridget, daughter of William, lord Windsor, and was father of Henry Ferrers. the antiquary. He was buried in Tarbick Church, Worcestershire. Another Edward Ferrers was one of the band of gentlemen pensioners at Elizabeth I's court on 1 June 1565, when he was assessed in a subsidy roll as owner of forty shillings worth of land in the parish of St. Dunstan and ward of Farringdon, London. But there is no evidence that either of these men was a dramatist.

Wood perpetuated the mistakes of Richard Puttenham in his Arte of English Poesie (1589), and of Francis Meres in his Palladis Tamia (1598), who both attributed to an Edward Ferrers or Ferris literary work which should have been placed to the credit of George Ferrers. Joseph Ritson, while correcting Wood's main errors, nevertheless maintained that there was probably a dramatist named Edward Ferrers as well as the poet George Ferrers no evidence outside their testimony to show that Edward Ferrers as an author had any existence.
