= Constantine Lascaris =

Greek grammarian and scholar (1434–1501)

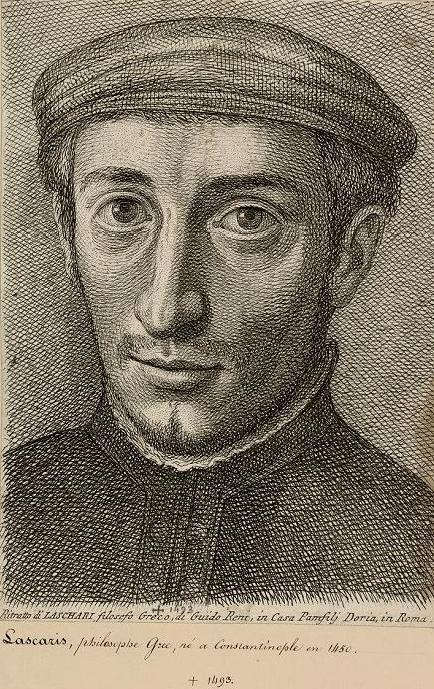
Constantine Lascaris as depicted by Paolo Fidanza (18th century).

Constantine Lascaris (Greek: Κωνσταντῖνος Λάσκαρις Kostantinos Láskaris; 1434 – 15 August 1501) was a Greek scholar and grammarian, one of the promoters of the revival of Greek learning in Italy during the Renaissance, born in Constantinople.

== Life ==
Constantine Lascaris was born in Constantinople, where he was educated by the scholar John Argyropoulos, Gemistus Pletho's friend and pupil. After the fall of Constantinople in 1453, he took refuge in Rhodes and then in Italy, where Francesco Sforza, Duke of Milan, appointed him Greek tutor to his daughter Hippolyta. Here was published his Grammatica Graeca, sive compendium octo orationis partium, remarkable as being probably the first book entirely in Greek issued from the printing press, in 1476.

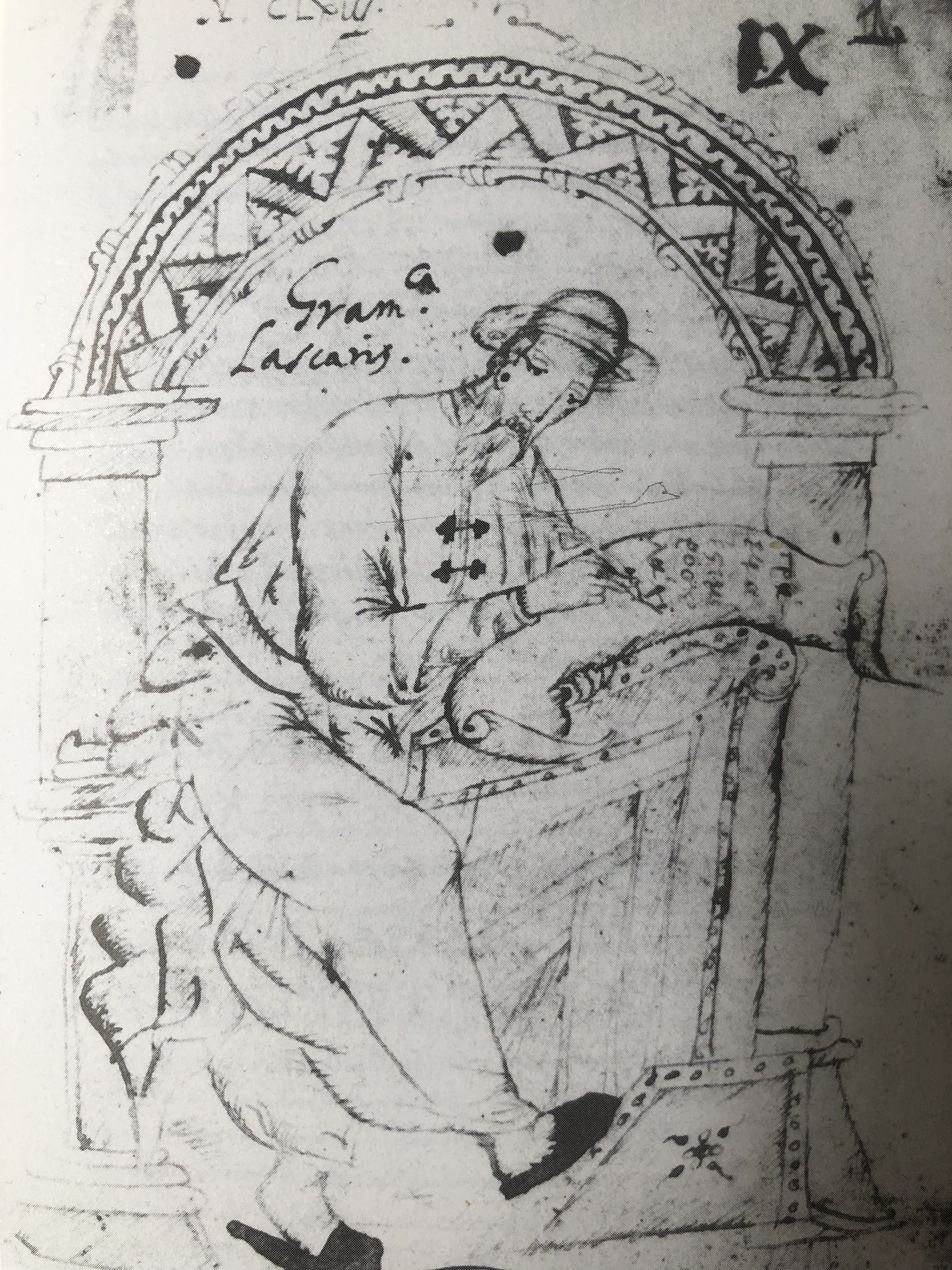
Constantine Lascaris writing his Grammatica as depicted by Pierre de Nolhac. (1887)

After leaving Milan in 1465, Lascaris taught in Rome and in Naples, to which he had been summoned by Ferdinand I to deliver a course of lectures on Greece. In the following year, on the invitation of the inhabitants, and especially of Ludovico Saccano, he settled in Messina (Sicily). On the recommendation of Cardinal Bessarion, he was appointed to succeed Andronikos Galaziotes to teach Greek to the Basilian monks of the island. He continued to work in Messina until his death, teaching many pupils who came on purpose to Sicily, from all over Italy, to learn grammar and Greek culture from him.

Among his numerous pupils in Milan was Giorgio Valla and, in Messina, Pietro Bembo, Angelo Gabrieli, Urbano Valeriani, Cola Bruno, Bernardino Rizzo, Francesco Faraone, Antonio Maurolico (the father of Francesco Maurolico), Francesco Giannelli and Cristóbal Escobar. Lascaris bequeathed his library of valuable manuscripts of philosophy, science and magic to the Senate of Messina; the collection, after the Messina revolt (1674-1678), was confiscated and carried to Spain and is now in the Spanish National Library in Madrid. In the second half of the sixteenth century his tomb in Messina was totally destroyed during the repression of the Counter-Reformation. He was a typical Renaissance humanist, with polymathic interests, but especially in Neoplatonism combined with Pythagoreanism (which was dear to many contemporary Byzantine scholars). Through his pupils Antonio Maurolico, Francesco Faraone and Giacomo Notese-Genovese his knowledge reached the scientist Francesco Maurolico.

Lascaris died in Messina in 1501.

== Work ==
The Grammatica, which has often been reprinted (including the famous Manuzio's edition of 1494–1495 with the Golden Verses of Pythagoras), is the most valuable work produced by Lascaris. In 1499 at Messina he published the Vitae illustrium philosophorum siculorum et calabrorum, with the first Renaissance biography of Pythagoras. Some of his letters are given by Johannes Iriarte in the Regiae Bibliothecae Matritensis codices Graeci manuscripti (Madrid, 1769). His name was later known to readers in the romance of Abel-François Villemain, Lascaris, ou les Grecs du quinzieme siècle (1825). See also John Edwin Sandys, Hist. Class. Schol., ed. 2, vol. ii (1908), pp. 76 foll.

== See also ==
- Greek scholars in the Renaissance
