= 1513 in literature =

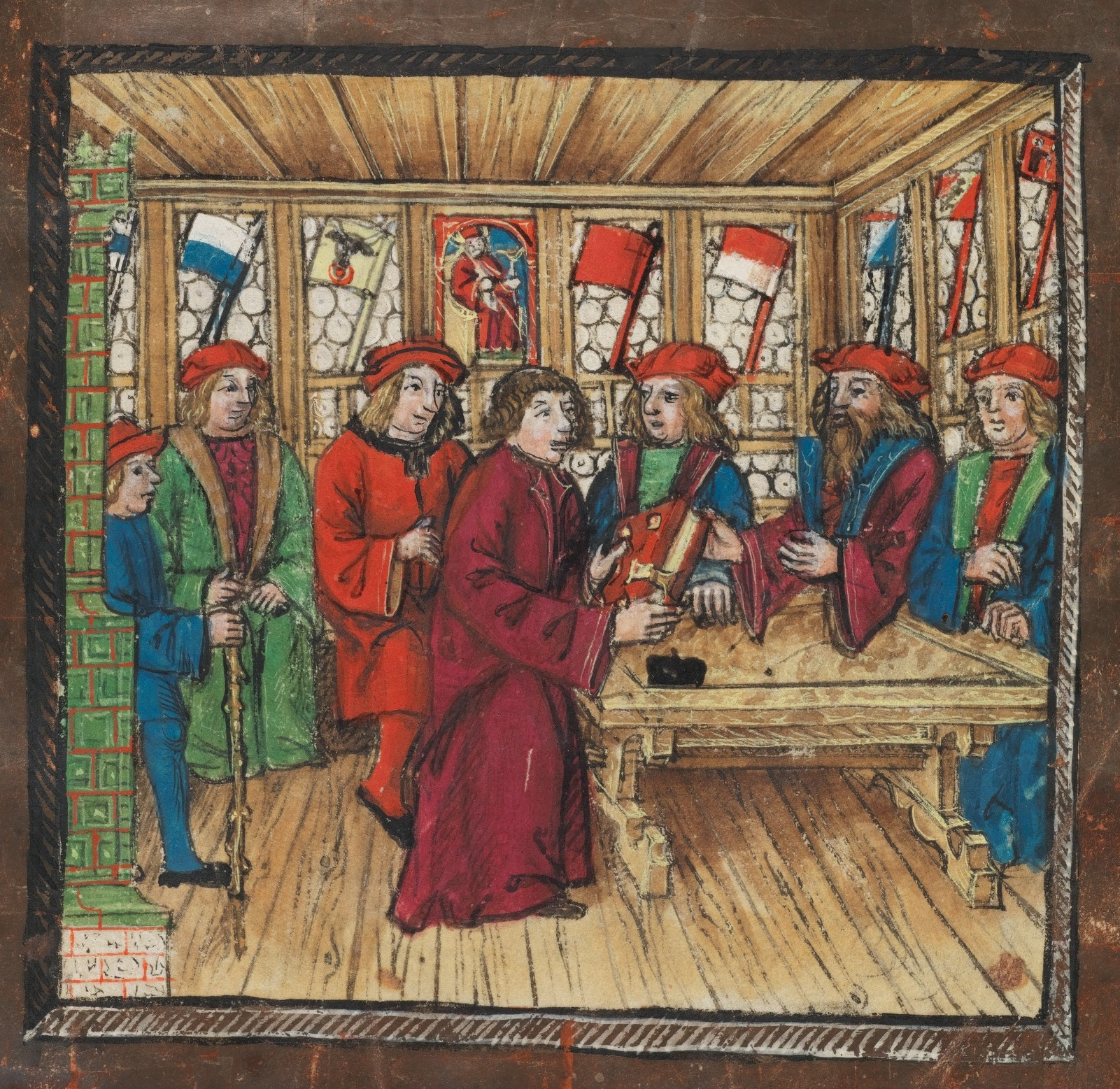
Diebold Schilling the Younger presents his illustrated chronicle to the Council of Lucerne, 15 January 1513

This article contains information about the literary events and publications of 1513.

== Events ==
unknown dates

  - The Aldine Press editiones principes of Lycophron, Lysias, Pindar and Plato is published by Aldus Manutius in Venice. Aldus this year also publishes Strozii poëtae pater et filius, the collected poems of Tito Vespasiano Strozzi (died c. 1505) and his son Ercole Strozzi (murdered 1508).
  - Niccolò Machiavelli is banished from Florence by the House of Medici and writes The Prince as De Principatibus (On Principalities) in Tuscany this summer.
  - Johannes Potken publishes the first Ge'ez (liturgical Ethiopian) text, Psalterium David et Cantica aliqua, at Rome.
  - Gavin Douglas completes the Eneados, the first translation of Virgil's Aeneid (or any major poem of classical antiquity) into any of the Germanic languages – in this case, the Scots dialect of English. A Latin/English parallel text version of Ovid's Ars Amatoria made by "Walter" is also published this year by Wynkyn de Worde in London as The flores of Ouide de arte amandi with theyr englysshe afore them.
- Approximate year – John Skelton is appointed poet laureate by Henry VIII of England.

== New books ==
=== Prose ===
- Hakob Meghapart – Parzatumar (Armenian: Պատարագատետր)

=== Drama ===
- Juan del Encina – Plácida y Victoriano

=== Poetry ===
- John Lydgate (anonymously) – Troy Book (verse paraphrase written 1412–20)
- Mallanarya of Gubbi – Bhava Chintaratna
- John Skelton (anonymously) – A Ballade of the Scottysshe Kynge

== Births ==
- February 8 – Daniele Barbaro, Venetian writer, translator and cardinal (died 1570)
- October 30 – Jacques Amyot, French writer and translator (died 1593)
- December 23 – Thomas Smith, English scholar, diplomat and poet (died 1577)

== Deaths ==
- January – Hans Folz, German Meistersinger (born c. 1437)
- unknown dates
  - Henry Bradshaw, English monk and poet (born c. 1450)
  - Robert Fabyan, English chronicler and sheriff
  - Hua Sui, Chinese pioneer of metal movable type printing (born 1439)
