= John Paul Nazarius =

Italian Dominican theologian

John Paul Nazarius or Giovanni Paolo Nazari (December 1556 – 14 February 1645) was an Italian Dominican theologian.

== Biography ==
He was born at Cremona. He entered the order at an early age in his native town and from the beginning was noted for his spirituality and love of study. It is most probable that he studied philosophy and theology at the University of Bologna. He taught with great success in various schools of his order in Italy.

In 1592 he was sent by Pope Clement VIII and the General of the Dominicans, Ippolito Maria Beccaria, to accompany the Apostolic Nuncio to Prague to combat the prevailing heresies. There he spent three years teaching in the Studium Generale of the province, lecturing on theology in the university, preaching and defending Catholicism against the innovators. Returning to Italy in 1596 he became regent of studies in the convent at Milan.

In 1597 the pope appointed him to defend in a public disputation at Chiavenna the Catholic doctrine of the Holy Sacrifice of the Mass against Calvinistic preachers. The resulting victory put Nazarius in popular demand throughout the country. In 1620 the citizens of Milan chose him as ambassador to the Royal Court of Philip III of Spain to adjust certain matters of Importance to Milan; in May, 1622 he represented as definitor the ecclesiastical province of Lombardy at the Dominican general chapter held at Milan.

He spent the close of his life at Bologna where he occupied himself with teaching and writing, and died there in 1641.

== Writings ==
Among Nazarius's major writings are:

- Commentaria et Controversiae in primam partem Summae S. Thomae (Bologna, 1620)
- Commentaria et Controversiae in tertiam partem Summae S. Thomae (Bologna, 1625)
- Opuscula varia theologica et philosophica (Bologna, 1630)
- De SS. Patrum et doctorum Ecclesiae auctoritate in doctrina theologica (Bologna, 1633)
