= 1557 in literature =

This article contains information about the literary events and publications of 1557.

== Events ==
- May 4 – The Stationers' Company in the City of London, a printers' guild, receives a Royal Charter.
- June 5 – The London publisher Richard Tottel produces Tottel's Miscellany (Songes and Sonettes, written by the ryght honorable Lorde Henry Haward late Earle of Surrey, and others), the first printed anthology of English poetry, edited by himself and including first publication of original poems by Henry Howard, Earl of Surrey (beheaded 1547) and Sir Thomas Wyatt (died 1542)
- June 10 – The New Testament of the Geneva Bible, a Protestant Bible translation into English, supervised by William Whittingham and printed in Roman type, is published in Geneva.

== New books ==
=== Prose ===
- Thomas North – The Diall of Princes (translation from French version of Antonio de Guevara's Reloj de Principes, chiefly from Marcus Aurelius's Meditations)
- Pierre de La Primaudaye - Académie française, divisée en dix-huit journées [traitant] de l'institution des mœurs, et de ce qui concerne le bien et heureusement vivre en tous états et conditions, par les préceptes de la doctrine et les exemples de la vie des anciens sages et hommes illustres
- Ludwig Rabus - Historien der Heyligen (completed)
- Robert Recorde – The Whetstone of Witte
- Hans Staden – Warhaftige Historia und beschreibung eyner Landtschafft der Wilden Nacketen, Grimmigen Menschfresser-Leuthen in der Newenwelt America gelegen (True history and description of wild, ferocious man-eaters in the New World of America)
- Peregrinaggio di tre giovani figliuoli del re di Serendippo, a version of The Three Princes of Serendip published by Michele Tramezzino, allegedly after an Italian translation by Cristoforo Armeno

=== Drama ===
- Lodovico Dolce – Medea

=== Poetry ===
- Giovanni Battista Giraldi – Ercole
- Tottel's Miscellany

== Births ==
- February 15 – Alfonso Fontanelli, Italian composer and writer (died 1622)
- Unknown date – Jean de Sponde, Basque French poet (died 1595)

== Deaths ==
- April 9 – Mikael Agricola, Finnish scholar (born c. 1510)
- August 1 – Olaus Magnus, Swedish ecclesiastic and writer (born 1490)
- September 13 – John Cheke, English classical scholar and statesman (born 1514)
- October 20 – Jean Salmon Macrin, French poet (born 1490)
- Unknown dates
  - Gonzalo Fernández de Oviedo y Valdés, Spanish historian (born 1478 in literature)
  - Nicolas de Herberay des Essarts, French translator (birth year unknown)
