= 1510 in literature =

This article contains information about the literary events and publications of 1510.

== Events ==
- c. January – Desiderius Erasmus begins his period of residence in Cambridge (England).
- April 10 – Henry Cornelius Agrippa addresses the dedication of De occulta philosophia libri tres to Johannes Trithemius.
- Aberdeen Breviary publication completed in Edinburgh, the first full-length book printed in Scotland and the last production of the Chepman and Myllar Press.

== New books ==
=== Prose ===
- Paolo Cortesi – De Cardinalatu
- Dinim de shehitah i bedikah (The Rules of Ritual Slaughter and Inspection of Animals) in Constantinople, the earliest known Judaeo-Spanish text, published in Constantinople.
- Garci Rodríguez de Montalvo (died c. 1505) – Las sergas de Esplandián (The Adventures of Esplandián)
- Ruiz Paez de Ribera – Florisando
- probable – Thomas More: The Life of Johan Picus Erle of Myrandula

=== Poetry ===
- Jean Marot – Voyage de Gênes
- Approximate year – Stephen Hawes: The Example of Vertu, published by Wynkyn de Worde
- Between 1510 and 1513 – The Friar and the Boy (fabliau published in English)

== Births ==
- unknown dates
  - Satomura Shōkyū (里村昌休), Japanese master of the linked verse renga (died 1552)
  - Luigi Tansillo, Italian Marinist Petrarchan poet (died 1568)
- probable
  - Arnoldus Arlenius, Dutch humanist philosopher and poet (died 1582)
  - Hélisenne de Crenne (probably Marguerite Briet), French novelist and translator (died after 1552)
  - Sebestyén Tinódi Lantos, Hungarian lyricist, epic poet, political historian and minstrel (died 1556)
  - Martynas Mažvydas, Lithuanian religious writer (died 1563)
  - Thomas Phaer, Welsh lawyer, paediatrician and translator (died 1560)
  - Lope de Rueda, Spanish playwright and author (died 1565)
  - Robert Wedderburn, Scottish poet (died 1555/60)

== Deaths ==
- May 1 – Johannes Nauclerus, Swabian historian (born c. 1425)
- August 23 – Ulrich Gering, printer
- September (14, 15 or 16) – Saint Catherine of Genoa, mystic (born 1447)
- November 11 – Bohuslav Hasištejnský z Lobkovic, Bohemian humanist writer and noble (born 1461)
- unknown date – Pothana, Telugu poet (born 1450)
