= 1552 in literature =

This article contains information about the literary events and publications of 1552.

== Events ==
- June – Sir David Lyndsay's Middle Scots satirical morality play A Satire of the Three Estates first performed publicly in full, at Cupar in Fife.
- unknown dates
  - Giachem Bifrun produces the first printed book in the Swiss Romansh language (Putèr), Christiauna fuorma, a catechism.
  - Belgrade printing house is established.
  - Ralph Roister Doister, the first known comedy in the English, is written by London schoolmaster Nicholas Udall for his pupils to perform.

== New books ==
=== Prose ===
- Book of Common Prayer (revised)
- Bartolomé de las Casas – A Short Account of the Destruction of the Indies (Brevísima relación de la destrucción de las Indias) (written 1542)
- François Rabelais – Le Quart Livre
- Gerónimo de Santa Fe (posthumously) – Hebræomastix
- Libellus de Medicinalibus Indorum Herbis (Little Book of the Medicinal Herbs of the Indians), composed in Nahuatl by Martín de la Cruz and translated into Latin by Juan Badiano.

=== Drama ===
- David Lyndsay – A Satire of the Three Estates (first public performance)
- Hans Sachs – Der Bauer im Fegefeuer

=== Poetry ===
- See 1552 in poetry

== Births ==
- February 8 – Agrippa d'Aubigné, French Protestant poet (died 1630)
- unknown dates
  - Jean Bertaut, French poet (died 1611)
  - Philemon Holland, English translator and schoolmaster (died 1637)
  - Edmund Spenser, English poet (died 1599)
- probable – Cvijeta Zuzorić, Croatian poet (died 1648)

== Deaths ==
- June 10 – Alexander Barclay, probably Scottish-born English writer, cleric and translator (born c. 1476)
- October 17 – Andreas Osiander, German theologian (born 1498)
- December 11 – Paolo Giovio, Italian historian and biographer (born 1483)
- December 30 – Francisco de Enzinas, Spanish-born Netherlandish scholar and humanist (born c. 1518)
