= 1500 in literature =

This article contains information about the literary events and publications of 1500.

== Events ==
- December 31 – Figurae bibliae by Antonius Rampegollis is printed in Venice by Georgius Arrivabenus. This is generally accepted as the last of the end of incunables.
- unknown date – John Skelton, tutor to Prince Henry (second son of King Henry VII of England, is referred to as "unum Britannicarum literarum lumen ac decus" in De Laudibus Britanniae, a Latin ode by Desiderius Erasmus, .

== New books ==
=== Prose ===
- This is the Boke of Cokery (first known printed cookbook in English)
- Hieronymus Brunschwygk – Liber de arte distillandi de simplicibus (Simple book on the art of distillation)
- Desiderius Erasmus – Adagia (Paris)
- Johannes Trithemius – Steganographia (approximate year)

=== Drama ===
- The Wakefield Master – Second Shepherds' Play (approximate year)

=== Poetry ===
- Beves of Hamtoun (approximate publication date, written c. 1300)
- Geoffrey Chaucer (anonymously) – Mars and Venus (approximate date of publication)

== Births ==
- April 12 – Joachim Camerarius (the Elder), German classical scholar (died 1574)
- April 23
  - Alexander Ales, Scottish-born religious controversialist (died 1565)
  - Johann Stumpf, Swiss historical and topographical writer (died 1576)
- December 6 – Nicolaus Mameranus, Luxembourg soldier and Latin-language historian and poet (died c. 1567)
- unknown dates
  - Jeanne de la Font, French poet and culture patron (died 1553)
  - Charles Dumoulin, French jurist (died 1566)
- probable
  - Johannes Aal, Swiss theologian and composer (died 1553)
  - Erasmus Alberus, German humanist, reformer and poet (died 1553)
  - Shlomo Halevi Alkabetz, Greek kabbalist and poet (died 1580)
  - Francisco de Moraes, Portuguese writer (died 1572)
  - Hayâlî, Ottoman Turkish poet (died 1557)
  - Nikolaus Herman, German hymnist (died 1561)
  - Pier Angelo Manzolli (Marcello Palingenio Stellato), Neapolitan Christian humanist poet (died before 1551)
  - Ludovico Pasquali, Dalmatian Italian poet (died 1551)
  - Wu Cheng'en, Chinese novelist (died 1582)

== Deaths ==
- April 10 – Michael Tarchaniota Marullus, Greek scholar, poet and soldier (born c. 1453; drowned)
- June 23 – Lodovico Lazzarelli, Italian poet, philosopher, courtier and magician (born 1447)
- August 9 – Janus Plousiadenos, Greek Renaissance scholar and hymn-writer (born c. 1429)
- August 10 – Serafino dell'Aquila, Petrarchan poet (born 1466)
- October 1 – John Alcock, bishop, politician and writer (born c.1430)
- probable – Stefano Infessura, Italian humanist writer (born c. 1435)
- possible – Ieuan ap Huw Cae Llwyd, Welsh poet
