= 1577 in literature =

This article contains information about the literary events and publications of 1577.

== Events ==
- The Curtain Theatre is built in London.
- December 4 – John of the Cross, while imprisoned in Toledo, Spain, composes his Spiritual Canticle.

== New books ==
=== Prose ===
- Certain Selected Histories for Christian Recreations (translation of Gesta Romanorum)
- Richard Eden – The History of Travayle in the West and East Indies
- John Frampton – Ioyfull newes out of the newe founde worlde, wherein is declared the rare and singular vertues of diuerse and sundrie hearbes, trees, oyles, plantes, and stones, with their applications, as well for phisicke as chirurgerie, translated from the 1565 Spanish edition of Nicolás Monardes' Historia medicinal de las cosas que se traen de nuestras Indias Occidentales
- Thomas Hill – The Gardener's Labyrinth
- Raphael Holinshed – The Chronicles of England, Scotland and Irelande
- Marcin Kromer – Polonia sive de situ, populis, moribus, magistratibus et Republica regni Polonici libri duo
- Piotr Skarga – Żywoty świętych starego i nowego zakonu
- Teresa of Ávila – Camino de Perfección
- Johann Weyer
  - De praestigiis daemonum
  - De lamiis liber item de commentitiis jejuniis
  - De ira morbo

=== Drama ===
- Arthur Golding – Abraham's Sacrifice published (translated from Theodore Beza's French play)

=== Poetry ===
- See 1577 in poetry

== Births ==
- February 8 – Robert Burton, English scholar and author (died 1640)
- March/April – Gerhard Johann Vossius, Dutch theologian (died 1649)
- November 10 – Jacob Cats, Dutch poet (died 1660)
- November 20 (baptized) – Samuel Purchas, English travel writer (died 1626)
- unknown dates
  - Richard Sibbes, English theologian (died 1635)
  - Gabriel Sionita, Lebanese-born Maronite Bible translator (died 1648)
  - Samuel Ward, English Puritan preacher and writer (died 1640)

== Deaths ==
- March 6 – Remy Belleau, French poet (born 1528)
- April 21 – Girolamo Parabosco, Italian poet and musician (born c. 1524)
- May 5 – Viglius, Frisian statesman and writer (born 1507)
- October 7 – George Gascoigne, English poet (born c. 1535)
- Unknown dates
  - Richard Jugge, English printer (date of birth unknown)
  - Ralph Robinson, English writer and translator (born 1520 in literature)
