= 1512 in literature =

This article contains information about the literary events and publications of 1512.

== Events ==
- unknown dates
  - Urbatagirk (Armenian: Ուրբաթագիրք, "The Book of Friday"), the first printed book in the Armenian language, is printed in Venice by Hakob Meghapart.
  - The concept of the masque is brought to Britain by King Henry VIII of England.

== New books ==
=== Prose ===
- Desiderius Erasmus – Copia: Foundations of the Abundant Style (De Utraque Verborum ac Rerum Copia)
- Henry Medwall – Fulgens and Lucrece
- Huldrych Zwingli – De Gestis inter Gallos et Helvetios relatio
- Il-yeon – The Samguk Yusa (Korean)

=== Poetry ===
- Hieronymus Angerianus – Erotopaegnion
- Stephen Hawes – The Comfort of Lovers
- Thomas Murner
  - Schelmenzunft (Guild of Rogues)
  - Narrenbeschwörung (Muster of Fools)

Uncertain date

- Syr Degore (written pre-1325)

== Births ==
- Thomas Sébillet, French writer on poetry (died 1589)
- Unknown dates
  - Thomas Beccon, English Protestant reformer and writer (died 1567)
  - Cristóvão Falcão, Portuguese poet (died c. 1557)

== Deaths ==
- October 14 – Dietrich Gresemund, German humanist writer (born 1477)
- Unknown date – Enveri, Ottoman Turkish historian and poet
