= 1506 in literature =

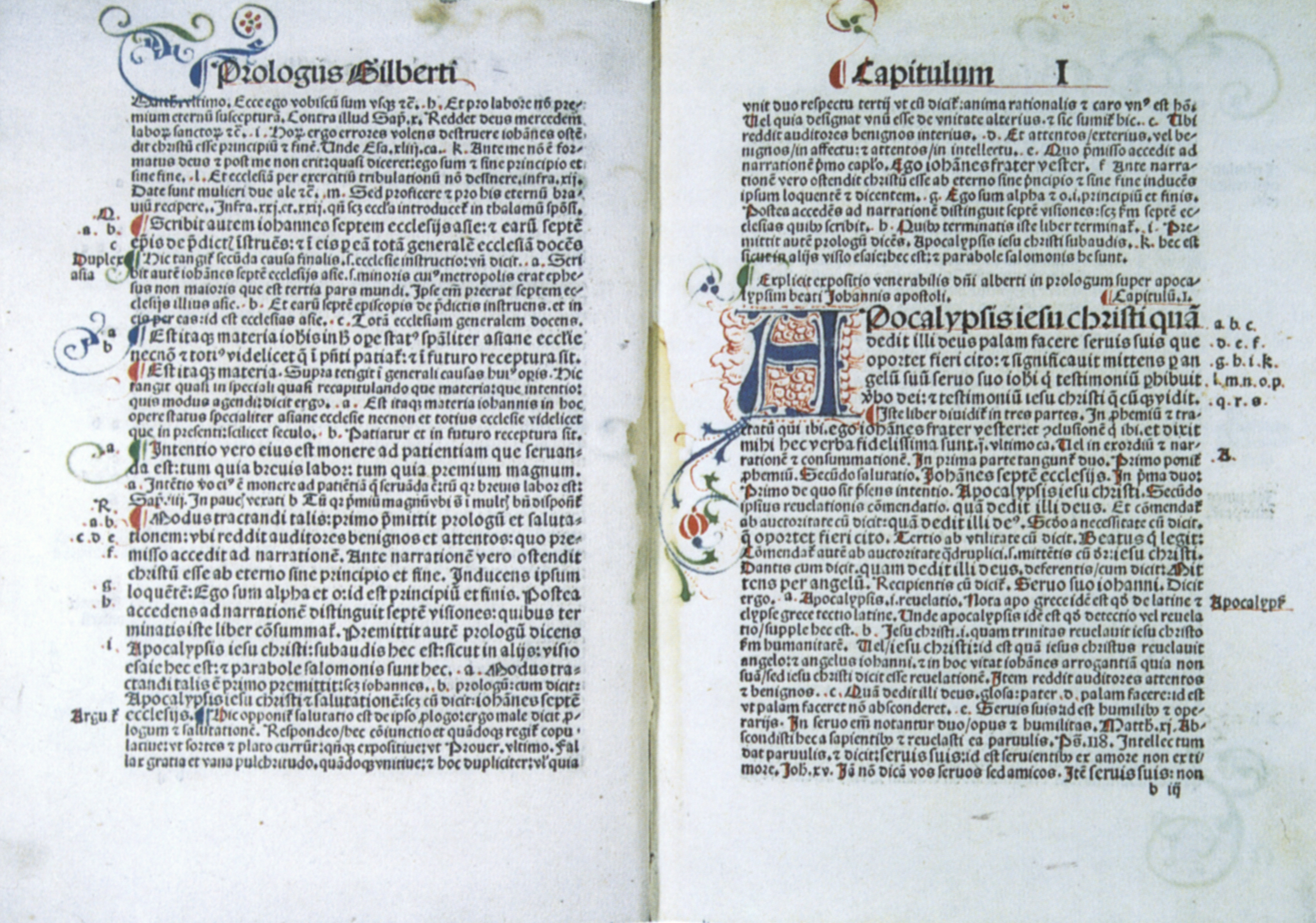
Albertus Magnus: Postillatio in Apocalypse, Basel, Jacob de Pfortzen, 1506

This article contains information about the literary events and publications of 1506.

== Events ==
- unknown date – Italian poet Ludovico Ariosto begins writing Orlando Furioso (earliest version published in 1516; first complete version published 1532).

== New books ==
=== Poetry ===
- Publio Fausto Andrelini – Eclogues
- William Dunbar – The Dance of the Sevin Deidly Synnis
- Stephen Hawes – The Passtyme of Pleasure
- Niccolò Machiavelli – The First Decade (Decennale primo)

== Births ==
- February 1 (approximate) – George Buchanan, Scottish humanist historian, scholar and poet (died 1582)
- August 12 – Franciscus Sonnius, Dutch counter-Reformation theologian (died 1576)
- October – Louis de Blois, Flemish mystical writer (died 1566)
- December 8 – Veit Dietrich, German theologian, writer and reformer (died 1549)
- Unknown dates
  - Abderrahman El Majdoub, North African poet, Sufi and mystic
  - Michael Helding (Sidonius), Roman Catholic bishop, scholar, writer and humanist (died 1561)
- probable
  - Richard Grafton, English chronicler and King's Printer (died 1573)
  - Hwang Jini, Korean woman kisaeng and poet (died c. 1560)

== Deaths ==
- February 16 – Jakub of Gostynin, Polish philosopher (born c.1454)
- May 2 – Johannes von Soest, German composer, theorist and poet (born 1448)
- unknown date – Mihri Hatun, Ottoman Anatolian female poet
