= 1502 in literature =

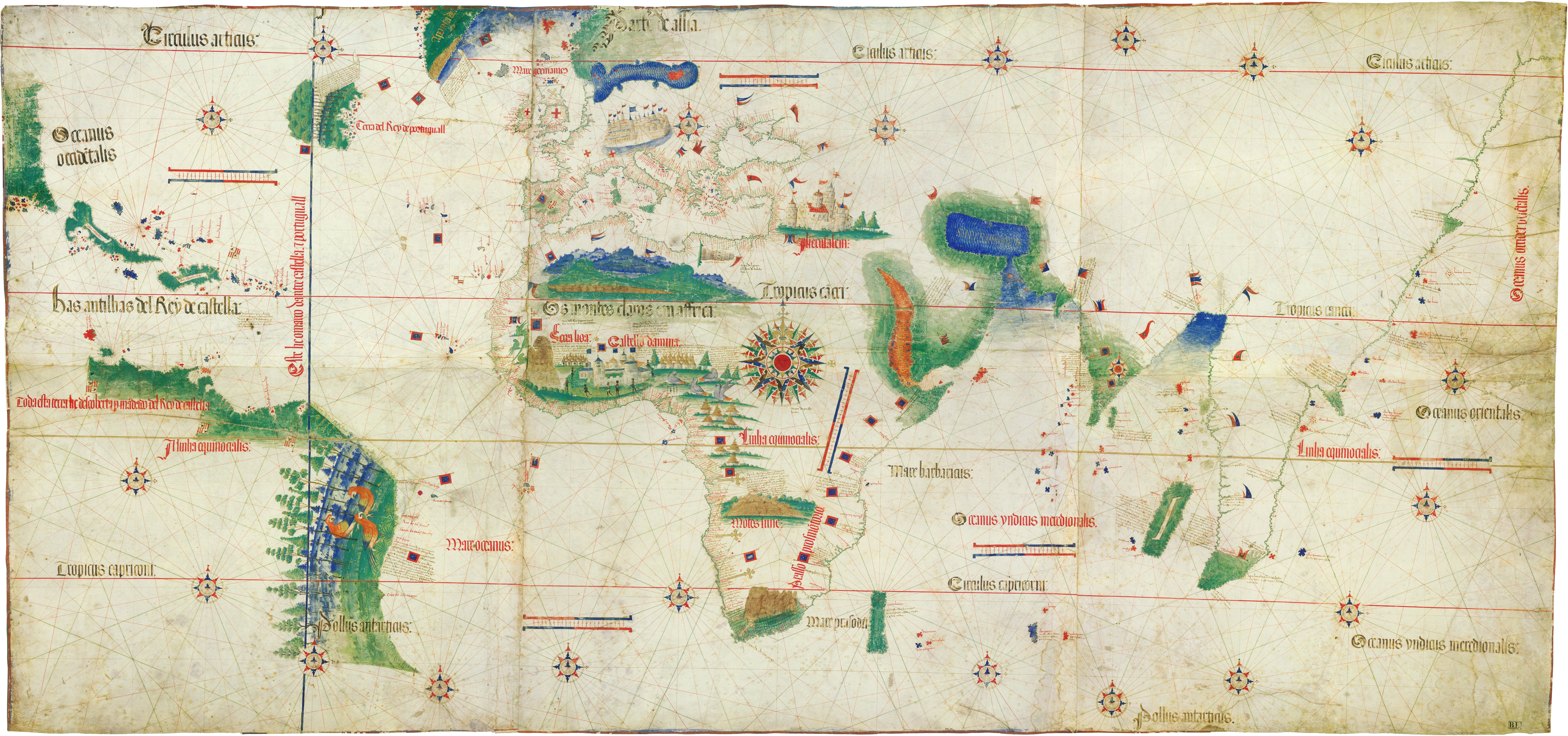
The Cantino planisphere (1502)

This article contains information about the literary events and publications of 1502.

== Events ==
- June – England's Poet Laureate John Skelton is believed to have been tried, in a case brought by the London Prior of St Bartholomew's, and subsequently imprisoned, possibly at the instigation of Cardinal Wolsey.
- unknown dates
  - Aldine Press editions of Dante's Divine Comedy, Herodotus' Histories (in Greek and Italian parallel text) and Sophocles are published in Venice.
  - The English poet Stephen Hawes is appointed Groom of the Chamber to King Henry VII of England.
  - Cantino planisphere (map of Portuguese discoveries)

== New books ==
=== Prose ===
- Niccolò Machiavelli – Discourse about the Provision of Money (Discorso sopra la provisione del danaro)
- Shin Maha Thilawuntha – Yazawin Kyaw

=== Drama ===
- Gil Vicente – Monólogo do Vaqueiro ("Monologue of the Cowboy")

=== Poetry ===
- Pietro Bembo – Terzerime (published by Aldus Manutius)
- Conradus Celtis – Quatuor libri amorum secundum quatuor latera germanie
- Baptista Mantuanus – Sylvae
- Jacopo Sannazaro – Arcadia (pirated edition)

== Births ==
- Guillaume Bigot, French writer, doctor, humanist and poet in French and Latin (died 1550)
- probable – Benedetto Varchi, Florentine humanist, historian and poet in Latin (died 1565)

== Deaths ==
- February – Olivier de la Marche, French poet and chronicler (born 1426)
- March 14 – Felix Fabri (Felix Faber), Swiss Dominican theologian and travel writer (born c. 1441)
- unknown dates
  - Jalaladdin Davani, Iranian philosopher, theologian, jurist and poet (born 1426)
  - Henry Medwall, English dramatist (born c. 1462)
  - Octavien de Saint-Gelais, French churchman, poet and translator (born 1468)
  - Sōgi (宗祇), Japanese Zen monk and renga poet (born 1421)
- probable
  - Gwerful Mechain, Welsh erotic poet (born c. 1460)
  - Bonino Mombrizio, Milanese lawyer, bureaucrat, philologist, humanist, editor of ancient writings and poet in Latin (born 1424)
