= Stephen Hawes =

English poet

Stephen Hawes (c. 1474 – 1523) was an English poet of the Tudor period.

== Life ==
He was probably born in Suffolk when the surname was common. If his own statement of his age may be trusted, he was born about 1474. He was educated at Oxford and travelled in England, Scotland and France. On his return his various accomplishments, especially his most excellent vein in poetry, procured him a place at court. He was Groom of the Chamber to Henry VII as early as 1502. According to Anthony Wood, he could repeat by heart the works of most of the English poets, especially the poems of John Lydgate, whom he called his master. He was still living in 1521, when it is stated in Henry VIII's household accounts that £6, 13s. 4d. was paid to Mr Hawes for his play; he died before 1530, when Thomas Field, in his Conversation between a Lover and a Jay, wrote "Yong Steven Hawse, whose soule God pardon, Treated of love so clerkly and well".

Some critics, notably C. S. Lewis, have treated Hawes dismissively: "faculty was what he lacked; there was more and better poetry in him than he could express", referring to his "broken-backed metre and dull excursions into the seven liberal arts". But his metre is not consistently broken-backed: from time to time (though not very often) one encounters lines that would not have disgraced either Chaucer before him or Spenser after him: "The fragraunt fumes / dyde well encense out // All mysty vapours / of perturbacyon // ore lyker was / her habytacyon // Vnto a place / whiche is celestyall // Than to a terrayne / mancyon fatall" or "By her propre hande / soft as ony sylke // With due obeysaunce / I dyde her than take // Her skynne was whyte / as whalles bone or mylke // My thoughtes was rauysshed / I myght not aslake // My brennynge hert / she the fyre dyde make // These daunces truely / musyke hath me tought // To lute or daunce / but it auayled nought" and so on, where, so long as one pronounces at least some of the final e's, the metre seems to work quite well.

Novelist Hilda Lamb made Hawes a character of her novel The Willing Heart published in 1958, where he is fictionally portrayed as an illegitimate son of King Richard III's. No contemporary documents support this assumption.

== Works ==
His major work is The History of Graunde Amour and la Bel Pucel, conteining the knowledge of the Seven Sciences and the Course of Mans Life in this Worlde or The Passetyme of Pleasure, printed by Wynkyn de Worde in 1509, but finished three years earlier. It was also printed with slightly varying titles by the same printer in 1517, by J. Wayland in 1554, by Richard Tottel and by John Waley in 1555. Tottel's edition was edited by T. Wright and reprinted by the Percy Society in 1846.

The Passetyme of Pleasure is a long allegorical poem in seven-lined stanzas of man's life in this world. It is divided into sections after the manner of Le Morte d'Arthur and borrows the machinery of romance. Its main motive is the education of the knight, Graunde Amour, based, according to William John Courthope (History of English Poetry, vol. I. 382), on the Marriage of Mercury and Philology, by Martianus Capella, and the details of the description prove Hawes to have been acquainted with medieval systems of philosophy. At the suggestion of Fame, and accompanied by her two greyhounds, Grace and Governance, Graunde Amour starts out in quest of La Bel Pucel. He first visits the Tower of Doctrine or Science where he acquaints himself with the arts of grammar, logic, rhetoric and arithmetic. After a long disputation with the lady in the Tower of Music he returns to his studies, and after sojourns at the Tower of Geometry, the Tower of Doctrine, the Castle of Chivalry, etc., he arrives at the Castle of La Bel Pucel, where he is met by Peace, Mercy, Justice, Reason and Memory. His happy marriage does not end the story, which goes on to tell of the oncoming of Age, with the concomitant evils of Avarice and Cunning. The admonition of Death brings Contrition and Conscience, and it is only when Remembraunce has delivered an epitaph chiefly dealing with the Seven Deadly Sins, and Fame has enrolled Graunde Amours name with the knights of antiquity, that we are allowed to part with the hero. This long imaginative poem was widely read and esteemed, and certainly exercised an influence on the genius of Edmund Spenser.

Hawes's poetry sought to revive the earlier medieval romances and allegorical poems which he much admired. Other works of Hawes include The Conversyon of Swerers (1509) and A Joyfidi Medytenon to all Englonde, a coronation poem (1509).
