= 1504 in literature =

This article contains information about the literary events and publications of 1504.

== Events ==
- Unknown dates
  - Walloon poet Jean Lemaire de Belges joins the court of Margaret of Austria, Duchess of Savoy.
  - Aldus Manutius publishes his edition of Demosthenes in Venice.

== New books ==
=== Prose ===
- Pomponius Gauricus – De sculptura et pictura antiquorum
- Jacopo Sannazaro – Arcadia (romance)

=== Drama ===
- Beunans Meriasek (in Cornish)

=== Poetry ===
- Pierre Gringore – Les Abus du monde
- Thomas More – Fortune Verses (c. 1504)
- Jacopo Sannazaro - Arcadia

== Births ==
- October 29 – Shin Saimdang, Korean calligrapher and poet (died 1551)
- November – Giovanni Battista Giraldi ("Cinthio"), Italian novelist and poet (died 1573)
- c. December – Nicholas Udall, English schoolmaster playwright (died 1556)
- unknown date – Ranabai, Hindu mystical poet (died 1570)

== Deaths ==
- August 28 – John Paston, English gentleman, author and recipient of some of the Paston Letters (born 1444)
- September 24 – Bartolomeo della Rocca ("Cocles"), Italian astrologer (born 1467)
- unknown dates
  - Petrus Haedus (Pietro Cavretto), Italian priest and writer (born 1427)
  - Garci Rodríguez de Montalvo, Castilian author (born c. 1450)
