= 1508 in literature =

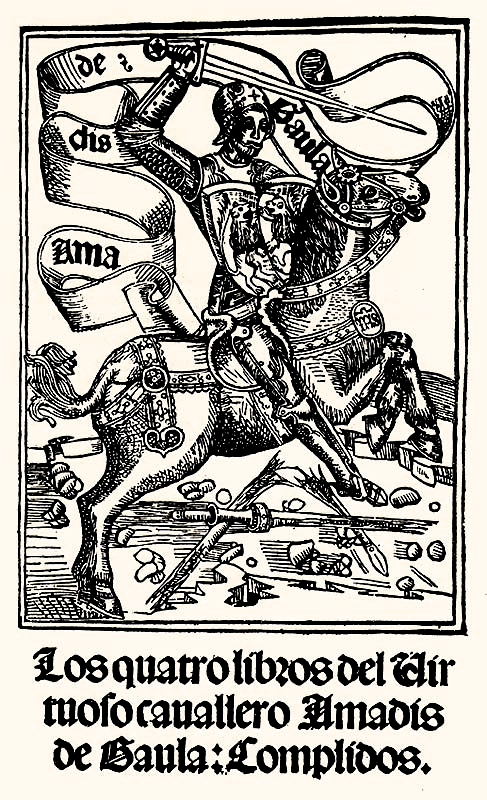
Title page of the earliest known edition of Amadís de Gaula, 1508, in the British Library. The text was written in the fifteenth century.

This article contains information about the literary events and publications of 1508.

== Events ==
- April 4 – John Lydgate's poem The Complaint of the Black Knight becomes the first book printed in Scotland, from the Chepman and Myllar Press in Edinburgh.
- unknown date
  - The earliest known printed edition of the chivalric romance Amadis de Gaula, as edited and expanded by Garci Rodríguez de Montalvo (died c. 1505), is published in Castilian at Zaragoza.
  - Elia Levita completes writing the Bovo-Bukh in Yiddish.
  - Estimated date of Manuscript D of Leonardo da Vinci's treatise on painting.

== New books ==
=== Prose ===
- Desiderius Erasmus – Adagiorum chiliades (2nd ed., Venice)
- Johannes Trithemius – De septem secundeis

=== Drama ===
- Ludovico Ariosto – La Cassaria
- The World and the Child (possible date)

=== Poetry ===
- William Dunbar
  - The Flyting of Dunbar and Kennedy, and Other Poems
  - The Goldyn Targe

== Births ==
- April 3 – Jean Daurat (or Dorat), French poet and scholar, member of La Pléiade (died 1588)
- April 23 – Georg Sabinus, German poet, diplomat and academic (died 1560)
- June 13 – Alessandro Piccolomini, Italian humanist philosopher, translator and playwright (died 1579)
- December 21 – Thomas Naogeorgus, German Protestant reformer and Latin-language playwright (died 1563)
- Unknown dates
  - Marin Držić, Croatian dramatist, author and poet (died 1567)
  - Isabel de Josa, Catalan writer (died 1575)
  - Primož Trubar, Slovene Protestant reformer, pioneer of Slovenian written language (died 1586)

== Deaths ==
- February 4 – Conrad Celtes, German and Latin-language poet (born 1459)
- May 13 – Martial d'Auvergne, French poet (born 1420)
- June 6 – Ercole Strozzi, Italian poet, murdered (born 1471)
- August 27 – Hieronymus Münzer, co-author of the Nuremberg Chronicle (born 1437/47)
