= 15th century in literature =

This article is a list of literary events and publications in the 15th century.

== Events ==
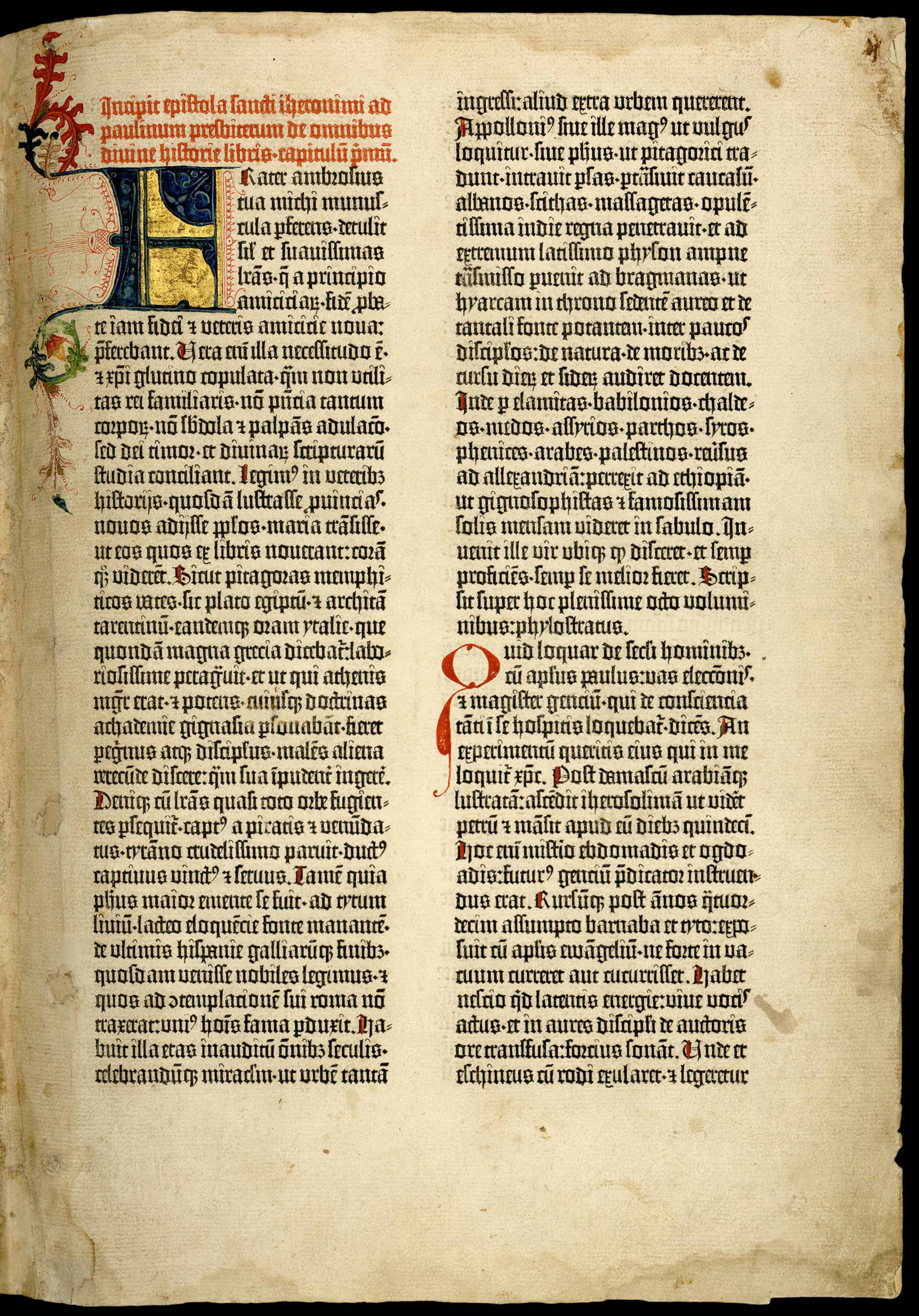
Page of the Gutenberg Bible

- 1403: July 12 – A guild of stationers is founded in the City of London. As the Worshipful Company of Stationers and Newspaper Makers (the "Stationers' Company"), it continues to be a Livery Company in the 21st century.
- 1403–08 – The Yongle Encyclopedia is written in China.
- c. 1408–11 – An Leabhar Breac is probably compiled by Murchadh Ó Cuindlis at Duniry in Ireland.
- c. 1410 – John, Duke of Berry, commissions the Très Riches Heures du Duc de Berry, illustrated by the Limbourg brothers between c. 1412 and 1416.
- 1424 – The first French royal library is transferred by the English regent of France, John of Lancaster, 1st Duke of Bedford, to England.
- 1425 – At about this date the first Guildhall Library (probably for theology) is established in the City of London under the will of Richard Whittington.
- 1434 – Japanese Noh actor and playwright Zeami Motokiyo is exiled to Sado Island by the Shōgun.
- 1438: 28 April – Completion of Margery Kempe's The Book of Margery Kempe, the first known English autobiography, begins (by dictation) at Bishop's Lynn in England; it will not be published in full until 1940.
- 1442 – Enea Piccolomini, the future Pope Pius II, arrives at the court of Frederick III, Holy Roman Emperor, in Vienna, who names him imperial poet.
- 1443 – King Sejong the Great establishes Hangul as the native alphabet of Korean. It is first described in the Hunminjeongeum published on 9 October 1446
- 1444: 15 June – Cosimo de' Medici founds a public library at San Marco, Florence, based on the collection of Niccolò de' Niccoli.
- 1448 – Pope Nicholas V founds the Vatican Library in Rome.
- 1450 – Johannes Gutenberg has set up his movable type printing press as a commercial operation in Mainz by this date and a German poem has been printed.
- 1451
  - 1 August – A manuscript of Dante's Divine Comedy is sold in London.
  - Sir Thomas Malory of Newbold Revel in Warwickshire, England, presumed author of the chivalric tales of Le Morte d'Arthur, is imprisoned for most of the following decade on multiple charges including violent robbery and rape.
- 1452 – Completion of the Malatestiana Library (Biblioteca Malatestiana) in Cesena (in the Emilia-Romagna region of Italy, commissioned by the city's ruler Malatesta Novello), the first European public library, in the sense of belonging to the commune and open to all citizens.
- 1452–3 – Johannes Gutenberg in Mainz probably prints the Sibyllenbuch, a poem of about 74 pages, of which only a fragment survives, making it the earliest known remnant of any European book printed using movable type.
- 1453 – Pageant of Coriolan staged in the piazza of Milan Cathedral.
- 1455
  - 23 February – Johannes Gutenberg completes printing of the Gutenberg Bible in Mainz, the first major book printed with movable type in the West, using a textualis blackletter typeface.
  - 5 June – French poet François Villon is implicated in a murder.
- 1457
  - 14 August – The Mainz Psalter, the second major book printed with movable type in the West, the first to be wholly finished mechanically (including colour) and the first to carry a printed date, is printed by Johann Fust and Peter Schoeffer for the Elector of Mainz.
  - The Central Library of Astan Quds Razavi in Persia is known to be in existence.
- 1460 – From about this date, Matthias Corvinus, King of Hungary, begins to form the Bibliotheca Corviniana, Europe's largest secular library.
- 1461 – Albrecht Pfister is pioneering movable type book printing in German and the addition of woodcut illustrations in Bamberg, producing a collection of Ulrich Boner's fables, Der Edelstein, the first book printed with illustrations. Soon after this he prints the first known Biblia pauperum (picture Bible).

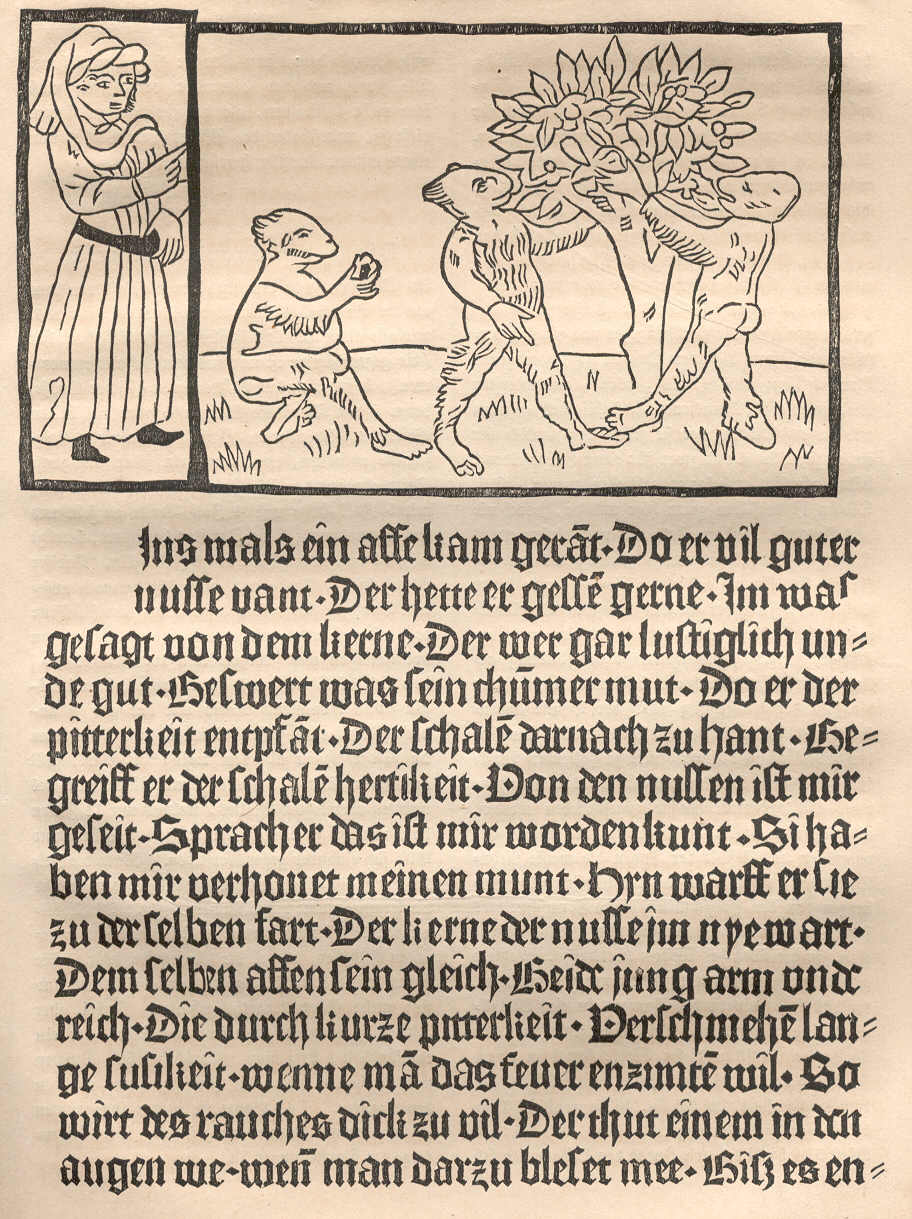
First incunable with printed illustrations, Ulrich Boner's Der Edelstein printed by Albrecht Pfister at Bamberg in 1461

- 1462: 10 September – Robert Henryson enrols as a teacher in the recently founded University of Glasgow in Scotland.
- 1462: 8 November – First known sentence written in Albanian, a Formula e pagëzimit (baptismal formula) by Archbishop Pal Engjëlli.
- 1463: 5 January – François Villon is reprieved from hanging in Paris but never heard of again.
- 1465 – Having established the Subiaco Press at Subiaco in the Papal States in 1464, German printers Arnold Pannartz and Konrad Sweynheim produce an edition of Donatus (lost), a Cicero, De Oratore (September 1465) and Lactantius' De divinis institutionibus (October 1465), followed by Augustine's De civitate Dei in 1467, the first books to be printed in Italy, using a form of Roman type.
- 1467 – German printers Arnold Pannartz and Konrad Sweynheim move from Subiaco to Rome where the Massimo family place a house at their disposal and they publish an edition of Cicero's letters that gives its name to the typographic unit of measurement the cicero.
- 1468
  - 31 May – The Byzantine scholar Cardinal Basilios Bessarion donates his library to the Republic of Venice, the foundation of the Biblioteca Marciana.
  - The printers Johann and Wendelin of Speyer settle in Venice; their first book published here, Cicero's Epistolae ad familiares, appears in 1469.
- 1470
  - Johann Heynlin prints the first book in Paris, the Epistolae Gasparini of Gasparinus de Bergamo (d. c. 1431), a guide to writing Latin prose.
  - Nicolas Jenson's edition of Eusebius, published in Venice, is the first book to use a roman type based on the principles of typography rather than manuscript.
  - Sermo ad populo predicabilis, a sermon printed in Cologne, is the first book to incorporate printed page numbers.
- 1473
  - First book printed in Hungary, Chronica Hungarorum, the "Buda Chronicle".
  - First known printing in Poland, Almanach cracoviense ad annum 1474, a wall calendar.
- 1474
  - First book printed in Spain, Obres e trobes en lahors de la Verge María, the anthology of a religious poetry contest held this year in Valencia.
  - Approximate date – Georgius Purbachius (Georg von Peuerbach)'s Theoricae nouae planetarum is published in Nuremberg, an early example of the application of color printing to an academic text.
- 1475
  - February – Pope Sixtus IV appoints the humanist Bartolomeo Platina as Prefect of the newly-re-established Vatican Library (Biblioteca Apostolica Vaticana) in Rome after Platina has presented him with the manuscript of his Lives of the Popes.
  - Rashi's commentary on the Torah is the first dated book to be printed in Hebrew, in Reggio di Calabria.
  - (or 1473–74?) – Recuyell of the Historyes of Troye is the first book to be printed in English, by William Caxton in Bruges using his own translation made in 1471.
- 1476
  - 30 January – Constantine Lascaris's Erotemata ("Questions", also known as Grammatica Graeca) is the first book to be printed entirely in Greek (in Milan).
  - William Caxton sets up the first printing press in England, at Westminster. This year he prints improving pamphlets: Stans Puer ad Mensam (John Lydgate's translation of Robert Grosseteste's treatise on table manners, printed together with Salve Regina); The Churl and the Bird and The Horse, the Goose and the Sheep (both by Lydgate); and a parallel text edition of Cato with translation by Benjamin Burgh.
  - First performance of one of Terence's plays since antiquity, Andria in Florence.
- 1477
  - The first printed edition of Ptolemy's Geography (in Latin translation as Cosmographia) with maps, published in Bologna, is the first printed book with engraved illustrations and also the first with maps by a known artist, the plates having been engraved by Taddeo Crivelli of Ferrara (book wrongly dated 1462).
  - 18 November – Caxton prints Earl Rivers' translation of Dictes or Sayengis of the Philosophres, the first full-length book printed in England on a printing press.

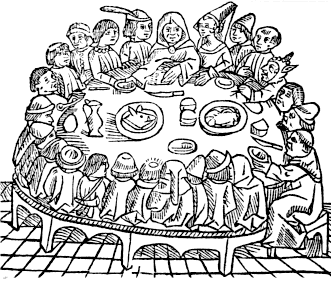
The Pilgrims diverting each other with tales; woodcut from Caxton's 1486 edition of Canterbury Tales

- 1478 – In England
  - William Caxton publishes the first printed copy of The Canterbury Tales (left unfinished at Chaucer's death in 1400).
  - The Ranworth Antiphoner is presented to St Helen's Church, Ranworth.
  - 17 December – First book printed in Oxford.
- 1479
  - The St Albans Press, the third printing press in England, is set up in the Abbey Gateway, St. Albans.
  - Robert Ricart begins writing The Maire of Bristowe is Kalendar in Bristol, England.
- 1480s (approximate date) – Scottish makar Robert Henryson writes The Morall Fabillis of Esope the Phrygian.
- 1482: 25 January – Probable first printing of the Torah (in Hebrew with vowels and marks of cantillation printed), with paraphrases in Aramaic and Rashi's commentary, printed in Bologna.
- 1483: 22 February – First known book printed in Croatian, the Missale Romanum Glagolitice (Misal po zakonu rimskoga dvora), a missal printed in Glagolitic script, edited in Istria and printed in either Venice or in Croatia at Kosinj.
- 1484: 22 June – First known book printed by a woman, Anna Rügerin, an edition of Eike of Repgow's compendium of customary law, the Sachsenspiegel, produced in Augsburg.
- 1485 – The play Elckerlijc wins first prize in the Rederijker contest in Antwerp.
- 1488 – Duke Humfrey's Library at the University of Oxford receives its first books.
- 1490
  - Chinese scholar Hua Sui invents bronze-metal movable type printing in China.
  - Publication in Valencia of the prose chivalric romance Tirant lo Blanch completed by Martí Joan de Galba from the work of the knight Joanot Martorell (d. c. 1468), written in Valencian and a pioneering example of the novel in modern Europe.
- 1491 (probable date) – Death of English publisher William Caxton; he is said to have completed his translation of a Vitae Patrum on the last day of his life.
- 1492: 16 January – Antonio de Nebrija publishes Gramática de la lengua castellana, the first grammar text for Castilian Spanish, in Salamanca, which he introduces to the Catholic Monarchs, Isabella I of Castile and Ferdinand II of Aragon, newly restored to power in Andalusia, as "a tool of empire".
- 1494: 17 August – Blaž Baromić completes the first work of his printing press in Senj, Croatia, a glagolithic missal, the second edition of the Missale Romanum.
- 1495: February–March – An edition of Constantine Lascaris's Erotemata in Greek with a parallel Latin translation (Grammatica Graeca) by Johannes Crastonis is the first book to be published by Aldus Manutius, in Venice, using typefaces cut by Francesco Griffo.
- 1495–1498 – Aldus Manutius publishes the Aldine Press edition of Aristotle in Venice.
- 1496: February – Francesco Griffo cuts the first old-style serif (or humanist) typeface (known from the 20th century as Bembo) for the Aldine Press edition of Pietro Bembo's narrative Petri Bembi de Aetna Angelum Chabrielem liber ("De Aetna", a description of a journey to Mount Etna) published in Venice, Aldus Manutius' first printing in the Latin alphabet and a work which includes early adoption of the semicolon (dated 1495 according to the more veneto).
- 1497
  - 7 February (Shrove Tuesday) – Followers of Girolamo Savonarola burn thousands of "immoral" objects, including books, at the Bonfire of the Vanities in Florence, an episode repeatedly revisited in literature.
  - Possible date – First performance of the earliest known full-length secular play wholly in English, Fulgens and Lucrece by Henry Medwall, the first English vernacular playwright known by name, perhaps at Lambeth Palace in London.
- 1499: Late – Contents of the library of the Madrasah of Granada are publicly burned.

== New works and first printings of older works ==
- 1400
  - Alliterative Morte Arthure
  - Shivaganaprasadi Mahadevaiah – Shunyasampadane
- c. 1400–1410
  - Nicholas Love – The Mirror of the Blessed Life of Jesus Christ (translation and adaptation into Middle English of the Meditations on the Life of Christ)
- 1402
  - Christine de Pizan – Dit de la Rose
- 1402–1403
  - Christine de Pizan – Le livre du chemin de long estude
- 1405
  - Christine de Pizan
    - L'Avision de Christine
    - The Book of the City of Ladies (Le livre de la Cité des dames)
    - The Treasure of the City of Ladies (Le trésor de la Cité des dames; also known as The Book of the Three Virtues)
- c. 1410
  - Mahathera Bodhiramsi – Cāmadevivaṃsa (Thai: ตำนานจามเทวีวงศ์)
- 1411
  - Thomas Occleve – The Regement of Princes
- 1413
  - Edward of Norwich, 2nd Duke of York – The Master of Game
- 1418
  - Domenico Bandini of Arezzo – Fons memorabilium universi
- 1420s?
  - The Awntyrs off Arthure
- 1420
  - John Lydgate – Siege of Thebes (poem)
  - Approximate date: Andrew of Wyntoun – Orygynale Cronykil of Scotland
- 1423
  - Jordi de Sant Jordi – "Presoner"
- 1424
  - Bhaskara – Jivandhara Charite
- 1425
  - Sharafuddin Ali Yazdi – Zafar Nama (history of Timur)
- 1427
  - Thomas à Kempis – The Imitation of Christ (De Imitatione Christi) (approximate date of completion)
- 1429
  - Leone Battista Alberti – Amator
  - Radoslav Gospels
  - (?) Kashefi – Anvār-e Soheylī (Persian: انوار سهیلی, "The Lights of Canopus"), a translation of the Panchatantra
- 1430
  - Kallumathada Prabhudeva – Ganabhasita Ratnamale
- 1434
  - Treatise on the Barbarian Kingdoms on the Western Oceans (China)
  - Approximate date: John Lydgate – The Life of St. Edmund, King and Martyr
- 1435
  - Leon Battista Alberti – Della Pittura
- 1436
  - The Marvels discovered by the boat bound for the Galaxy (China)
- 1438
  - The Buik of Alexander
  - Gilte Legende, a translation into Middle English
- 1439
  - Kalyanakirti – Jnanachandrabhyudaya
- 1440
  - Santikirtimuni – Santinathacharite
  - Lorenzo Valla – De falso credita et ementita Constantini Donatione declamatio
  - Zhu Quan – Cha Pu (Tea Manual)
  - Approximate date: Geoffrey the Grammarian (probable compiler) – Promptorium parvulorum
- 1444
  - Aeneas Sylvius Piccolomini – The Tale of Two Lovers
- 1447
  - Walter Bower – Scotichronicon (completed)
- 1448
  - Vijayanna – Dvadasanuprekshe
- 1450
  - Reginald Pecock – Represser of over-much weeting [blaming] of the Clergie
  - Approximate date: Ballads "A Gest of Robyn Hode" and "Robin Hood and the Monk"
- 1453
  - Antoine de la Sale – Petit Jehan de Saintre
- 1455
  - Padmanābha – Kanhadade Prabandha
- Pre-1460
  - Ausiàs March – Poems
  - Turpines Story (Middle English translation of the Historia Caroli Magni)
- 1461
  - François Villon – Grand Testament
- 1464
  - The Deeds of Sir Gillion de Trazegnies in the Middle East
  - A Short English Chronicle (Cronycullys of Englonde)
- 1467
  - Cardinal Juan de Torquemada – Meditationes, seu Contemplationes devotissimae ("Meditations, or the Contemplations of the Most Devout"), the first book printed in Italy to include woodcut illustrations
- 1469/70
  - Giovanni Boccaccio – The Decameron (completed 1353)
- c. 1470–85
  - Pietru Caxaro – Il Cantilena, oldest known Maltese text
- 1471
  - Marsilio Ficino (translator) – De potestate et sapientia Dei, a translation from the Hermetica
- 1472
  - Dante Alighieri – Divine Comedy (written c. 1308–21), first printed 11 April in Foligno, Italy, by Johann Numeister and Evangelista Angelini da Trevi
  - Johannes de Sacrobosco – De sphaera mundi (written c. 1230), the first printed astronomical book
  - Paul of Venice (died 1429) – Logica Parva
  - Roberto Valturio – De re militari, the first book with technical illustrations
  - Approximate date: Thomas à Kempis (died 1471) – The Imitation of Christ (De Imitatione Christi) (first printing)
- 1472 or 1473
  - Johannes Tinctoris – Proportionale musices (Proportions in Music)
  - Zainuddin – Rasul Bijay (Victory of the Messenger) in Bengali
- 1473
  - Avicenna – The Canon of Medicine
  - Richard de Bury – The Philobiblon (first printing; written 1345)
  - Sir John Fortescue – The Governaunce of England (first published 1714)
  - Approximate date: Missale Speciale (Constance Missal)
- 1474
  - Obres e trobes en lahors de la Verge María, first literary book printed in Spain (40 poems in Catalan/Valencian, 4 in Spanish, 1 in Italian)
  - Werner Rolevinck – Fasciculus temporum
- 1475
  - (or 1473–74?) – Recuyell of the Historyes of Troye, the first book printed in English, by William Caxton, in his own translation, in Bruges
- c. 1475?
  - The Squire of Low Degree
- 1476
  - Caxton's first edition of Geoffrey Chaucer's Canterbury Tales
  - Masuccio Salernitano (died 1475) – Il Novellino
- 1477
  - Earl Rivers (translator) – Dictes or Sayengis of the Philosophres (printed by William Caxton in Westminster)
  - William Caxton (translation from the French of Raoul Le Fèvre) – History of Jason (printed by Caxton)
  - Bible in duytsche (Delft Bible)
  - The Travels of Marco Polo (first printing; written c. 1299)
  - Approximate date: Blind Harry – The Wallace (The Actes and Deidis of the Illustre and Vallyeant Campioun Schir William Wallace, Middle Scots poem)
- 1478
  - Bíblia Valenciana (Valencian Bible), the first printed bible in Catalan/Valencian, translated by Bonifaci Ferrer
- 1479
  - Rodolphus Agricola – De inventione dialectica
- 1480
  - Pierre Le Baud – Compillation des cronicques et ystoires des Bretons (approximate date of completion)
  - John of Capua – Directorium Humanae Vitae, a translation of the Panchatantra
- 1481
  - The boke intituled Eracles, and also of Godefrey of Boloyne the whiche speketh of the conquest of the holy londe of Iherusalem, a translation by William Caxton from Estoire d'Eracles, the French version of William of Tyre's Historia
  - Mirrour of the Worlde, a translation of 1480 by William Caxton from Vincent of Beauvais's Speculum Maius, the first book printed in England to include woodcut illustrations
  - The Historie of Reynart the Foxe (first English translation)
  - Approximate date: 'Pseudo-Apuleius' – Herbarium Apuleii Platonici, the first printed illustrated herbal
- 1482
  - Mosen Diego de Valera – Crónica abreviada de España ("Crónica Valeriana")
  - Euclid – Elements (in Latin)
  - Hans Tucher der Ältere – Beschreibung der Reyß ins Heylig Land
- 1483
  - The Book of the Knight of the Tower, a translation by William Caxton
  - The Golden Legend, a translation by William Caxton; as the most printed incunable across Europe, this reaches its 9th edition in English by 1527
  - Giacomo Filippo Foresti – Supplementum chronicarum
  - Das Der Buch Beyspiele, a translation of the Panchatantra
  - Theophrastus – Historia Plantarum (first Latin version of Περὶ φυτῶν ἱστορία translated by Theodore Gaza)
- 1484
  - Aesop's Fables, a translation (from French) by William Caxton
  - Plato – Opera Platonis (complete works), a translation by Marsilio Ficino
- 1485
  - Leon Battista Alberti (died 1472) – De Re Aedificatoria (written 1443–52), the first printed work on architecture
  - Joseph Albo – Sefer ha-Ikkarim (written before 1444)
  - Bommarasa of Terakanambi – Sanatkumara Charite
  - Sir Thomas Malory – Le Morte d'Arthur
- 1486
  - Bernhard von Breydenbach – Peregrinatio in Terram Sanctam, with illustrations taken from life by the printer Erhard Reuwich
  - The Boke of Seynt Albans, with a contribution attributed to Juliana Berners
  - Giovanni Pico della Mirandola – De hominis dignitate
- 1487
  - Niccolò da Correggio – Fabula di Cefalo
  - Heinrich Kramer with James Sprenger – Malleus Maleficarum, a witch-hunting manual
- 1488–1489
  - Homer – Iliad (Ἰλιάς), Odyssey (Ὀδύσσεια) and Homeric Hymns edited by Demetrios Chalkokondyles and Bernardus Nerlius
- 1489
  - Marsilio Ficino – De vita libri tres (Three Books on Life)
- 1490
  - John Ireland – The Meroure of Wyssdome
  - Joanot Martorell and Martí Joan de Galba – Tirant lo Blanch
- c. 1490s
  - Jacomijne Costers – Visioen en exempel
- 1491
  - Johannes de Ketham (ed.) – Fasciculus Medicinae (first printed book to contain anatomical illustrations)
- 1492
  - John of Gaddesden – Rosa Medicinæ (first printing; written 1307)
- 1493
  - 15 June: Hartmann Schedel – Nuremberg Chronicle
  - Giuliano Dati – Lettera delle isole novamente trovata, a translation into verse of a letter from Christopher Columbus to Ferdinand of Spain regarding Columbus' first exploratory voyage across the Atlantic in 1492
  - Isocrates – Orationes, edited by Demetrios Chalkokondyles
  - The Seven Sages of Rome, midland English version of the Seven Wise Masters story cycle (printed by Richard Pynson)
- 1494
  - Sebastian Brant – Ship of Fools (Daß Narrenschyff)
  - Fra Luca Pacioli – Summa de arithmetica
- 1496
  - Isaac Abrabanel – Ma'yene ha-Yeshu'ah
  - Juan del Encina – Cancionero
- 1497
  - Mīr-Khvānd – Rawżat aṣ-ṣafāʾ
  - Luis Ramírez de Lucena – Repetición de Amores y Arte de Ajedrez (on chess)
- 1497–1504
  - Pietro Bembo – Gli Asolani (three volumes on courtly love, first printed 1505)
- 1498
  - Annio da Viterbo – Commentaria super opera diversorum auctorum de antiquitatibus loquentium ("Antiquities", forgeries)
  - Polydore Vergil – Adagia
- 1499
  - Francesco Colonna (attrib.) – Hypnerotomachia Poliphili
  - Pierre Desrey – Genealogie de Godefroi de Buillon
  - Thomas of Erfurt (mistakenly ascribed to Duns Scotus) – De Modis Significandi (first printing; written in early 14th century)
  - Niccolò Machiavelli – Discorso sopra le cose di Pisa
  - Fernando de Rojas – Comedia de Calisto y Melibea, better known as La Celestina
  - Polydore Vergil – De inventoribus rerum
  - Jehan Lagadec (ed.) – Catholicon, the first French dictionary (trilingual with Breton and Latin; compiled in 1464)
- Undated
  - Krittibas Ojha (translator, died 1461) – Krittivasi Ramayan
  - Kim Si-sŭp (1435–93) – Kŭmo sinhwa (金鰲新話, "Tales of Mount Kŭmo" or New stories of the Golden Turtle)
  - At least two of the Middle English versions of Ipomadon
  - Suda, edited by Demetrios Chalkokondyles
  - Voynich manuscript (undeciphered, carbon dated to early 15th century)

=== Drama ===
- c. 1463–1475
  - Probable date of composition of the "N-Town Plays" in The Midlands of England
- 1470
  - Approximate date of composition of Elckerlijc, attributed to Peter van Diest (first printed 1495)
  - Probable date of composition of Mankind
- 1492
  - Juan del Encina – Triunfo de la fama
- 1493
  - Ludovico Ariosto – La tragedia di Tisbe
- c.1497
  - Henry Medwall – Fulgens and Lucrece
- Approximate date of composition
  - The Castle of Perseverance
  - The Somonyng of Everyman

== Births ==
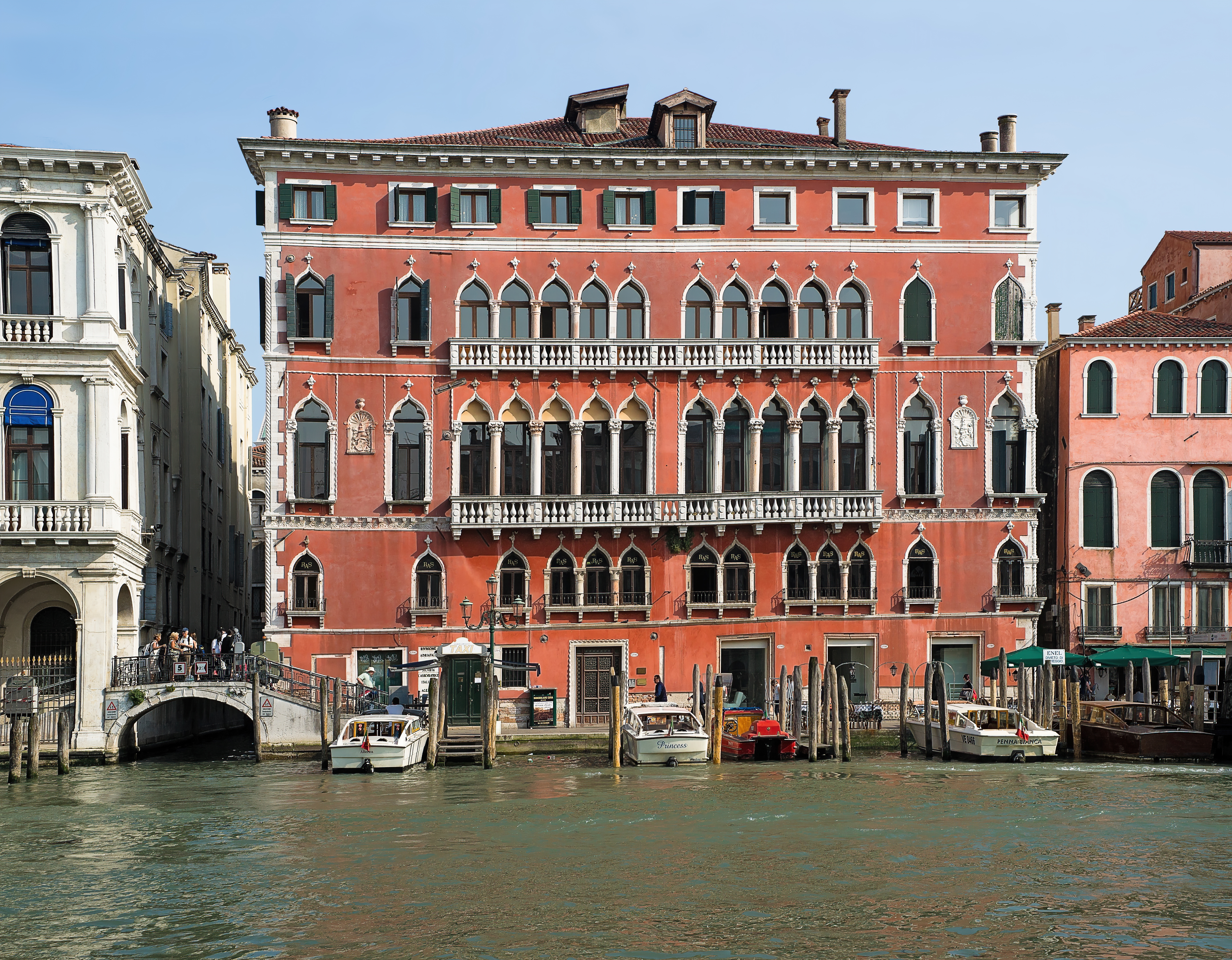
Palazzo Bembo on the Grand Canal (Venice), birthplace of Pietro Bembo

- Early 15th c. – Henry Lovelich, English poet and translator from London
- 1405: 18 October – Aeneas Sylvius Piccolomini, Italian erotic poet and novelist, later Pope Pius II (died 1464)
- 1406 – Matteo Palmieri, Florentine humanist and historian (died 1475)
- 1410 – Masuccio Salernitano, born Tommaso Guardati, Italian writer (died 1475)
- 1413 – Giosafat Barbaro, Venetian travel writer (died 1494)
- c. 1426 – Bhalan, Indian Gujarati-language poet (died c. 1500)
- 1432 – Ōta Dōkan (太田 道灌, Ōta Sukenaga), Japanese samurai warrior-poet and Buddhist monk (died 1486)
- 1434: 29 August – Janus Pannonius, Hungarian/Croatian poet and bishop writing in Latin (died 1472)
- c. 1435 – Johannes Tinctoris (Jehan le Teinturier), Low Countries' writer on music and musician (died 1511)
- 1441: 9 February – Ali-Shir Nava'i, Chagatai Turkic-language Timurid poet and scholar (died 1501)
- c. 1441 – Felix Fabri (Felix Faber), Swiss Dominican theologian and travel writer (died 1502)
- 1449 – Aldus Manutius, Italian publisher (died 1515)
- c. 1451 – Richard Methley, English Dominican writer and translator (died 1527 or 1528)
- 1453 – Ermolao Barbaro, Italian scholar (died 1493)
- c. 1460 – John Skelton, English poet (died 1529)
- 1462: 8 September – Henry Medwall, English playwright and ecclesiastical lawyer (died c. 1501/2?)
- 1465 – Yamazaki Sōkan (山崎宗鑑, Shina Norishige), Japanese poet (died 1553)
- 1470: 20 May – Pietro Bembo, Venetian-born scholar, poet and cardinal (died 1547)
- c. 1473 – Jean Lemaire de Belges, Walloon French poet and historian (died c. 1525)
- 1475 – Ludovico Vicentino degli Arrighi, Italian calligrapher and type designer (died 1527)
- 1483: 6 March – Francesco Guicciardini, Italian historian and statesman
- 1483: 19 April – Paolo Giovio, Italian contemporary historian, bishop and scientist (died 1552)
- 1485 – Hanibal Lucić, Croatian poet and playwright (died 1553)
- 1486: 28 July – Pieter Gillis, Flemish humanist, printer and Antwerp city official (died 1533)
- 1488: c. 24 August – Ferdinand Columbus, Spanish bibliophile (died 1539)
- 1488: (estimated) – Otto Brunfels, German botanist and theologian (died 1534)
- 1490: Gáspár Heltai (Kaspar Helth), Transylvanian writer in German (died 1574)
- 1492: 11 April – Marguerite de Navarre, princess of France, queen consort, writer, religious reformer and patron of the arts (died 1549)
- 1494: November (probable) – François Rabelais, French writer (died 1553)
- 1496: 23 November – Clément Marot, French poet (died 1544)
- 1497 – Edward Hall, English historian, politician and lawyer (died 1547)

== Deaths ==
- 1400 – Jan of Jenštejn, archbishop of Prague, writer, composer and poet (born 1348)
- 1406: 19 March – Ibn Khaldun, North African historiographer and philosopher (born 1332)
- c. 1416 – Julian of Norwich, English religious writer and mystic (born c. 1342)
- 1426 – Thomas Hoccleve, English poet and clerk (born c. 1368)
- c. 1426 – John Audelay, English poet and priest (year of birth unknown)
- c. 1430 – Christine de Pizan, French poet and author of conduct books (born 1364)
- c. 1440 – Margery Kempe, English mystic and autobiographer (born c. 1373)
- c. 1443 – Zeami Motokiyo (世阿弥 元清), Japanese Noh actor and playwright (born c. 1363)
- 1448 – Zhu Quan (朱|權), Prince of Ning, Chinese military commander, feudal lord, historian and playwright (born 1378)
- c. 1451 – John Lydgate, English poet and monk (born c. 1370)
- 1454 – Francesco Barbaro, Italian humanist and politician (born 1390)
- 1458 – Íñigo López de Mendoza, 1st Marquis of Santillana, Castilian politician and poet (born 1398)
- 1459 - Ausiàs March, Valencian poet and knight (born 1400)
- 1464:
  - 14 August – Pope Pius II
  - John Capgrave, English historian and scholastic theologian (born 1393)
- 1468 – Joanot Martorell, Valencian novelist and knight (born 1413)
- 1471 – Sir Thomas Malory, presumed English writer (year of birth unknown)
- 1472: 27 March – Janus Pannonius, Hungarian/Croatian poet and bishop writing in Latin (born 1434)
- 1475 – Matteo Palmieri, Florentine historian and humanist (born 1406)
- c. 1483 – Richard Holland, Scottish cleric and poet
- 1486 – Margareta Clausdotter, Swedish chronicler and nun
- c. 1490 – Lewys Glyn Cothi, Welsh poet (born 1420)
- 1492 – Jami, Persian poet and scholar (born 1414)
- 1493 – Ermolao Barbaro, Italian scholar (born 1453)
- 1494 – Giosafat Barbaro, Italian travel writer, diplomat and explorer (born 1413)
- 1496: 28 August – Kanutus Johannis, Swedish Franciscan friar, writer and book collector

== See also ==
- 15th century in poetry
- 14th century in literature
- 16th century in literature
- List of years in literature
