= 1610 in literature =

List of years in literature	(table)
- … 1600; 1601; 1602; 1603; 1604; 1605; 1606; 1607; 1608; 1609; 1610; 1611; 1612; 1613; 1614; 1615; 1616; 1617; 1618; 1619; 1620 …
- Art; Archaeology; Architecture; Literature; Music; Philosophy; Science; +...

This article contains information about the literary events and publications of 1610.

== Events ==
- June 5 – The masque Tethys' Festival by Samuel Daniel is performed at Whitehall Palace to celebrate the investiture of Henry Frederick, Prince of Wales.
- September 7 – Lope de Vega buys a house in Madrid.
- December 12 – Sir Thomas Bodley makes an agreement with the Stationers' Company of London to put a copy of every book registered with it into his new Bodleian Library in the University of Oxford.
- unknown dates
  - The Douay–Rheims Bible (The Holie Bible Faithfully Translated into English), a translation of the Bible from the Latin Vulgate into English made by members of the English College, Douai, is published under the Catholic Church.
  - At the Dominican Order's printing press at Abucay Church in the Philippines, Tomas Pinpin prints Father Francisco Blancas de San Jose's Arte y Reglas de la Lengua Tagala and his assistant Diego Talaghay prints Pinpin's own Librong Pagaaralan nang mga Tagalog nang Uicang Castilla, the first book written by a native Filipino in the local Tagalog language. It encourages his countrymen to learn Spanish.
  - Henry Savile begins publication at Eton College at his own expense of Tou en hagiois patros hemon Ioannou Archiepiskopou Konstantinoupoleos tou Chrysostomou ton heuriskomenon, his edition of the works of St John Chrysostom, a notable work of English scholarship.

== New books ==
=== Prose ===
- Jean Beguin – Tyrocinium Chymicum
- Edmund Bunny – Of Divorce for adulterie and Marrying againe; that there is no sufficient warrant so to do
- William Camden – Britannia, in an enlarged translation by Philemon Holland into English
- Foxe's Book of Martyrs, fourth edition
- John Healey – St. Augustine of the Citie of God, a translation of St. Augustine's De Civitate Dei into English
- Charles Loyseau – Traité des ordres et simples dignités

=== Drama ===
- Samuel Daniel – Tethys' Festival or the Queenes Wake (masque)
- Lope de Vega
  - La buena guarda
  - El divino africano
  - La hermosa Ester
- John Fletcher – The Faithful Shepherdess (published)
- Ben Jonson
  - The Alchemist
  - The Speeches at Prince Henry's Barriers
- John Marston – Histriomastix (published)
- John Mason – The Turk (published)
- William Shakespeare – Cymbeline
- Joost van den Vondel – Het Pascha

=== Poetry ===
- Giles Fletcher the younger – Christ's Victory and Triumph

== Births ==
- January 10 – Louis Maimbourg, French historian (died 1686)
- January 15 (baptised) – Sidney Godolphin, English poet, politician and soldier (killed in action 1643)
- April 1 – Charles de Saint-Évremond, French soldier, critic and essayist (died 1703)
- July 4 – Paul Scarron, French poet, dramatist and novelist (died 1660)
- July 18 – Antonio de Solís y Ribadeneyra, Spanish dramatist and historian (died 1686)
- July 28 (baptised) – Henry Glapthorne, English dramatist (died c. 1643)
- December 18 – Charles du Fresne, sieur du Cange, French philologist and historian (died 1688)
- Unknown dates
  - Richard Bulstrode, English author and soldier (died 1711)
  - Edmund Chilmead, English writer and translator (died 1654)
  - Reinhold Curicke, German historian of the Hanseatic League (died 1667)
  - Jeremias de Dekker, Dutch poet (died 1666)
  - Jin Shengtan, born Jin Renrui, Chinese editor, writer and critic (died 1661)
  - Li Yu (李漁), Chinese comic writer (died 1680)
  - François Eudes de Mézeray, French historian (died 1683)
  - Madeleine Patin, French moralist writer (died 1682)

== Deaths ==
- July – Richard Knolles, English historian (born c. 1545)
- August 27 – Anne Bacon, English translator (born c. 1528)
- September 22 – Jan Moretus, Flemish printer (born 1543)
- November 21 – Benet Canfield, English mystical writer (born 1562)
- November 23 – Bernard de Girard Haillan, French historian (born c. 1535)
- November 28 – Lorenzo Scupoli, Italian theologian (born c. 1530)
- unknown dates
  - Adam Berg, German printer and publisher (born 1540)
  - Georgios Chortatzis, Greek verse dramatist (born c. 1545)
  - Nikola Vitov Gučetić, Ragusan philosopher and science writer (born 1549)
  - Yuan Hongdao (袁宏道), Chinese poet (born 1568)
- probable
  - Peter Bales, English inventor of shorthand (born 1547)
  - Philip Stubbs, English pamphleteer (born c. 1555)
