= 1622 in literature =

List of years in literature	(table)
- … 1612; 1613; 1614; 1615; 1616; 1617; 1618; 1619; 1620; 1621; 1622; 1623; 1624; 1625; 1626; 1627; 1628; 1629; 1630; 1631; 1632 …
- Art; Archaeology; Architecture; Literature; Music; Philosophy; Science; +...

This article contains information about the literary events and publications of 1622.

== Events ==
- January 6 (probably) – The Banqueting House, Whitehall, London, is opened with a performance of Ben Jonson's The Masque of Augurs designed by the building's architect, Inigo Jones.
- March 12 – Teresa of Ávila (died 1582), devotional writer, is canonized by Pope Gregory XV.
- June – Lucas Holstenius arrives in Britain to gather material for his Geographi Minores.
- November 19 – English writer and politician Sir Percy Herbert, created a baronet three days earlier, marries Elizabeth Craven, daughter of William Craven, a former Lord Mayor of London.
- unknown dates
  - Shakespeare's drama Othello is first published in the first quarto edition by Thomas Walkley in London, posthumously and nearly twenty years after the probable date of its first performance. New editions of four other Shakespeare plays in quarto are also issued this year, publishers being presumably aware of the imminent publication of the First Folio.
  - James Mabbe publishes an English translation of Mateo Alemán's novel Guzmán de Alfarache (1599).

== New books ==
=== Prose ===
- Juan Ruiz de Alarcón – El tejedor de Segovia
- Francis Bacon – The Historie of the Raigne of King Henry the Seventh
- Jacob Boehme – De Signatura Rerum
- Elizabeth Knyvet Clinton, Countess of Lincoln – The Countess of Lincoln's Nursery
- Marie de Gournay – Egalité des Hommes et des Femmes (Equality of Men and Women)
- Richard Hawkins – Voiage into the South Sea
- Henry Peacham – The Compleat Gentleman

=== Drama ===
- Giambattista Andreini – The Centaur (publication in Paris)
- Thomas Dekker and Philip Massinger – The Virgin Martyr (published)
- John Fletcher and Massinger (and Francis Beaumont?) – Beggars' Bush (acted at Court)
- Fletcher and Massinger – The Spanish Curate
- Ben Jonson – The Masque of Augurs
- Thomas Middleton and William Rowley – The Changeling
- Thomas Middleton and John Webster – Anything for a Quiet Life (published)
- William Rowley(? and another?) – The Birth of Merlin

=== Poetry ===
- Gervase Markham and William Sampson – Herod and Antipater
- Thomas May – The Heir
- John Taylor – The Water Cormorant His Complaint
- George Wither – Faire-Virtue, The Mistresse of Phil Arete

=== Non-fiction ===
- Francis Bacon – History of the Reign of King Henry VII

== Births ==
- January 15 – Molière (Jean-Baptiste Poquelin), French dramatist (died 1673)
- February 24 – Johannes Clauberg, German philosopher and theologian (died 1655)
- March 28 – Ermes di Colorêt, Italian nobleman and writer (died 1692)
- April 11 – Jan van Vliet, Dutch philologist (died 1666)
- April 17 – Henry Vaughan (died 1695), Welsh poet writing in English, and Thomas Vaughan, Welsh philosopher (died 1666, twins)
- September 22 – Jacques Savary, French commercial economist (died 1690)
- December 24 (baptised) – Francesc Fontanella, Catalan poet and dramatist (died c. 1680)
- Unknown date – Gilbert Mabbot, English journalist and licenser of the press 1647–49 (died c. 1670)

== Deaths ==
- April 14 – Antoine de Gaudier, French theologian (born 1572)
- June 4 – Péter Révay, Hungarian nobleman, poet and historian (born 1568)
- August 21 – Juan de Tassis y Peralta, 2nd Count of Villamediana, Spanish poet (murdered, born 1582)
- October – Sir George Buck, English antiquary and historian (born 1560)
- October 11 – Conrad Vetter, German polemicist (born 1547)
- November 4 – Francisco Rodrigues Lobo, Portuguese poet and bucolic writer (born 1580)
- December 19 – Benedetto Justiniani, Italian theologian (born 1550)
- Probable year of death
  - Henry Ainsworth, English scholar and cleric (born 1571)
  - Robert Carliell, English didactic poet (date of birth unknown)
  - John Owen, Welsh writer of Latin epigrams (born 1564)
