= 1612 in literature =

List of years in literature	(table)
- … 1602; 1603; 1604; 1605; 1606; 1607; 1608; 1609; 1610; 1611; 1612; 1613; 1614; 1615; 1616; 1617; 1618; 1619; 1620; 1621; 1622 …
- Art; Archaeology; Architecture; Literature; Music; Philosophy; Science; +...

This article contains information about the literary events and publications of 1612.

== Events ==
- January 6 – Ben Jonson's masque Love Restored is performed.
- January 12 – The King's Men and Queen Anne's Men unite for the first of two English Court performances in January, with Thomas Heywood's The Silver Age
- January 13 – The King's Men perform Heywood's The Rape of Lucrece.
- February 2 – Queen Anne's Men return to court to play Greene's Tu Quoque.
- May 11 – Shakespeare testifies in the Bellott v. Mountjoy lawsuit which involves his London landlord.
- November 6 – Henry Frederick, Prince of Wales, eldest son and heir to King James I of England, dies of typhoid fever. His coterie of followers, which included literary figures like Ben Jonson and John Selden, are forced to seek other patrons.
- unknown dates
  - Thomas Shelton publishes The History of the Valorous and Wittie Knight-Errant Don-Quixote of the Mancha, the first translation of Cervantes' novel Don Quixote (first part) into English (or any other language).
  - The Accademia della Crusca publishes the first dictionary of the Italian language.
  - "Printers Bible": Some copies of the King James Version of the Bible printed in England this year contain an erratum with Psalm 119:161 reading "printers" (rather than "princes") "have persecuted me without a cause."

== New books ==
- Traiano Boccalini – Ragguagli di Parnasso
- John Brinsley – Ludus literarius; or The Grammar Schoole
- John Davies – Discoverie of the True Causes why Ireland was never entirely subdued
- John Davies of Hereford – The Picture of a Happy Man
- Edward Grimeston
  - The Generall Historie of Spaine (translated from French)
  - The General History of the Magnificent State of Venice
- Thomas Heywood – An Apology for Actors
- Antonius Magirus – Koock-boeck ofte Familieren kevken-boeck
- William Strachey - The Historie of Travaile Into Virginia Britannia
- Francisco de Quevedo – La cuna y la sepultura

== New drama ==
- George Chapman – The Widow's Tears published
- Robert Daborne – A Christian Turn'd Turk published
- Nathan Field – A Woman is a Weathercock published
- Ben Jonson – Love Restored (masque)
- John Webster – The White Devil published

== Poetry ==
- Michael Drayton – Poly-Olbion
- Luis de Góngora – Fábula de Polifemo y Galatea (Fable of Polyphemus and Galatea)
- Expanded edition of The Passionate Pilgrim
- George Wither – Elegy on the death of Henry Frederick, Prince of Wales

== Births ==
- February 6 – Antoine Arnauld, French theologian and philosopher (died 1694)
- February 7 – Thomas Killigrew, English dramatist (died 1683)
- February 8 – Samuel Butler, English poet and satirist (died 1680)
- March 4 (bapt.) – Jan Vos, Dutch poet and dramatist (died 1667)
- March 20 – Anne Bradstreet, née Dudley, English-born American poet (died 1672)
- unknown date – Edward King, English poet (died 1637)
- probable – John Rushworth, English lawyer and historian (died 1690)

== Deaths ==
- February – John Gerard (John Gerarde), English botanist and author of herbal (born c. 1545)
- March 16 – Thomas Holland, English theologian and Bible translator (born 1539)
- April 11 – Emanuel van Meteren, Flemish historian (born 1535)
- June 1 – Carlos Félix, 6-year-old son of Lope de Vega.
- July 29 – Jacques Bongars, French diplomat and scholar (born 1554)
- August 4 – Hugh Broughton, English Biblical scholar (born 1549)
- September – Giovanni de' Bardi, Italian music theorist and critic (born 1534)
- September 24 – Johannes Lippius, German theologian, philosopher, composer, and music theorist (born 1585)
- September 27 – Piotr Skarga (Piotr Powęski), Polish hagiographer (born 1536)
- October 7 – Giovanni Battista Guarini, Italian poet (born 1538)
- November 20 – Sir John Harington, English courtier, writer and inventor of flush toilet (born 1560)
