= 1619 in literature =

| List of years in literature | (table) |
- … 1609; 1610; 1611; 1612; 1613; 1614; 1615; 1616; 1617; 1618; 1619; 1620; 1621; 1622; 1623; 1624; 1625; 1626; 1627; 1628; 1629 …
- Art; Archaeology; Architecture; Literature; Music; Philosophy; Science; +...

This article contains information about the literary events and publications of 1619.

== Events ==
- March – After the death of Richard Burbage, his place as leading actor of the King's Men in London is filled by Joseph Taylor.
- April – Ben Jonson visits the Scottish poet William Drummond of Hawthornden.
- c. October – After the death of Samuel Daniel in Somerset, his place as Poet Laureate of the Kingdom of England is filled by Ben Jonson.
- unknown dates
  - René Descartes has a dream that helps him develop his ideas on analytical geometry.
  - William Jaggard and Thomas Pavier publish in London the so-called False Folio, a collection of Shakespearean and pseudo-Shakespearean plays mostly with false imprints and dates.

== New books ==
=== Prose ===
- Johannes Valentinus Andreae
  - Reipublicae Christianopolitanae descriptio
  - Turris Babel
- Jacob Boehme – De Tribus Principiis (On the Three Principles of Divine Being)
- Philipp Clüver
  - Sardinia et Corsica Antiqua
  - Siciliae Antique libri duo
- Robert Fludd – Utriusque Cosmi...Historia, Tomi Secundi (The History of the Two Worlds, Volume 2)
- Johannes Kepler – Harmonices Mundi (an attack on Fludd's Neoplatonist cosmology)
- John Pitseus – De Illustribus Angliae scriptoribus
- Samuel Purchas – Purchas his Pilgrim or Microcosmus, or the Historie of Man. Relating the Wonders of his Generation, Vanities in his Degeneration, Necessities of his Regenerations
- Paolo Sarpi – History of the Council of Trent
- John Taylor – A Kicksey Winsey, or, A Lerry Come-Twang
- William Whately – A Bride-Bvsh; or a Direction for Married Persons. Plainely describing the Dvties common to both, and peculiar to each of them

=== Drama ===
- Anonymous – Two Wise Men and All the Rest Fools (published)
- Beaumont and Fletcher (published)
  - A King and No King
  - The Maid's Tragedy
- Gerbrand Adriaensz Bredero
  - De klucht van de koe
  - Stommen ridder
- Lope de Vega – Fuente Ovejuna (published)
- John Fletcher – The Humorous Lieutenant
- John Fletcher and Philip Massinger – Sir John van Olden Barnavelt
- Philip Massinger and Nathan Field – The Fatal Dowry (approximate date)
- Thomas Middleton – The Masque of Heroes

=== Poetry ===
- Robert Carliell – Britaine's glorie, or An allegoricall dreame... (a defence of the new Church of England)
- George Wither – Fidelia

== Births ==
- March 6 – Cyrano de Bergerac, French soldier and poet (died 1655)
- June 24 – Rijcklof van Goens, Governor-General of the Dutch East Indies 1678–81 and travel writer (died 1682)
- November 7 – Gédéon Tallemant des Réaux, French biographer (died 1692)
- December 28 – Antoine Furetière, French satirist (died 1688)
- unknown dates
  - Morgan Llwyd, Welsh preacher, poet and writer (died 1659)
  - Shalom Shabazi, Jewish Yemeni poet (died 1720)
- probable
  - William Chamberlayne, English poet, playwright, physician and Royalist soldier (died 1703)
  - Alice Curwen, English autobiographer and Quaker (died 1679)
  - Henry (Heinrich) Oldenburg, German-born editor, correspondent and Royal Society secretary (died 1677)

== Deaths ==
- February 9 – Lucilio Vanini, Italian philosopher (born 1585)
- February 12 – Pierre de Larivey, Italian-born French dramatist (born 1549)
- March 13 – Richard Burbage, English actor and theatre proprietor (born c. 1567)
- July 12 – Olivier de Serres, French writer on agriculture and horticulture (born 1539)
- October 14 – Samuel Daniel, English Poet Laureate and historian (born 1562)
- October 18 – Petrus Gudelinus, Dutch jurist (born 1550)
- October 19 – Fujiwara Seika, Japanese philosopher (born 1561)

probable

  - Ginés Pérez de Hita, Spanish novelist and poet (born c. 1544)
  - Pierre de La Primaudaye, French Protestant writer (born 1546)
