= 1603 in literature =

List of years in literature	(table)
- … 1593; 1594; 1595; 1596; 1597; 1598; 1599; 1600; 1601; 1602; 1603; 1604; 1605; 1606; 1607; 1608; 1609; 1610; 1611; 1612; 1613 …
- Art; Archaeology; Architecture; Literature; Music; Philosophy; Science; +...

This article presents lists of the literary events and publications in 1603.

== Events ==
- Early in the year – Thomas Middleton marries Magdalen (Mary) Marbeck in London.
- February/March – Thomas Heywood's domestic tragedy A Woman Killed with Kindness is performed by Worcester's Men at The Rose in London.
- March 19 – Performances in the London theaters are suspended due to the terminal illness of Queen Elizabeth I of England.
- March 24 – Queen Elizabeth I of England dies at Richmond Palace, ending the Elizabethan era begun in 1558, and is succeeded by her cousin King James VI of Scotland, where he has ruled since 1567, thus uniting the crowns of Scotland and England. Ben Jonson and Thomas Dekker collaborate on a pageant to welcome the new king and Thomas Middleton writes a speech of welcome to him.
- c. April – An outbreak of bubonic plague closes the London public theaters for a year.
- May 11 – Chronicler Richard Baker is knighted by James I.
- May 19 – The London acting company previously known as the Lord Chamberlain's Men comes under the patronage of the new monarch and is chartered as the King's Men. The principals are named as Lawrence Fletcher, William Shakespeare, Richard Burbage, Augustine Phillips, John Heminges, Henry Condell, William Sly, Robert Armin and Richard Cowley.
- August 17 – The Accademia dei Lincei, the oldest scientific academy in the world, is founded in Rome by Federico Cesi.
- October – Last known reference to Henry Chettle.
- November 17 – Sir Walter Ralegh goes on trial for treason in the converted Great Hall of Winchester Castle. He is found guilty but his life is spared by the King at this time and he is returned to imprisonment in the Tower of London.
- December 2 – As You Like It may have been performed at Wilton House before King James I.

Uncertain dates

- Elizabeth Melville, later Lady Colville of Culros, publishes her poem Ane Godlie Dreame in the Scots language in Edinburgh, as the first Scottish woman to see her work in print. She publishes the English translation, A Godly Dreame, in 1604.
- Jacobus Arminius becomes professor of theology at Leiden.
- An early legal deposit law requires a copy of every book printed in Venice to be placed in its Biblioteca Marciana.
- Johannes Huser of Waldkirch publishes a collected edition of Paracelsus's works.
- Frederick de Houtman publishes a grammar and dictionary of the Malay and Malagasy languages.
- Japanese female entertainer Izumo no Okuni originates kabuki dance drama in Kyoto.

== New books ==
=== Prose ===
- Johann Bayer – Uranometria
- John Davies of Hereford – Microcosmos
- Thomas Dekker
  - The Wonderful Year
  - (with Thomas Middleton) News from Gravesend
- John Florio – Essayes on Morall, Politike, and Millitarie Discourses of Lo. Michaell de Montaigne, a translation of Montaigne's Essais
- Samuel Harsnett – A Declaration of Egregious Popish Impostures
- Christopher Heydon – A Defence of Judiciall Astrologie
- Philemon Holland – The Philosophie, commonly called, the Morals, a translation of Plutarch's Moralia

=== Drama ===
- Anonymous – Philotus
- Thomas Heywood – A Woman Killed with Kindness
- Ben Jonson – Sejanus: His Fall and The Entertainment at Althorp
- John Marston – The Malcontent (first performed)
- William Percy – The Faery Pastoral, or, Forest of Elves (possible date)
- William Shakespeare – Hamlet published (first quarto, the "bad quarto")

=== Poetry ===
- Juan de la Cueva – La Conquista de Betica

== Births ==
- January 21 – Shackerley Marmion, English dramatist (died 1639)
- July 12 – Edward Benlowes, English poet (died 1676)
- August 9 – Johannes Cocceius, Dutch theologian (died 1669)
- August 16 – Adam Olearius, German scholar and librarian (died 1671)
- December 21 – Roger Williams, English-born American theologian (died 1684)

Uncertain dates

- Gabriel Bocángel, Spanish dramatist (died 1658)
- Valentin Conrart, French memoirist (died 1675)
- Gysbert Japiks, Frisian poet (died 1666)

Probable year

- George Abbot, English theologian and scholar (died 1648)

== Deaths ==
- February 18 – Claude Catherine de Clermont, French salon hostess (born 1543)
- February 19 – Juan Azor, Spanish philosopher (born 1535)
- April 25 – Gregory of Valencia, Spanish humanist philosopher (born 1550)
- June 27 – Jan Dymitr Solikowski, Polish writer and archbishop (born 1539)
- October/November – Will Kempe, English comic performer associated with works of Shakespeare
- November 16 – Pierre Charron, French theologian and philosopher (born 1541)
- November 30 – William Gilbert, English natural philosopher (born 1544)

Uncertain dates

- Sharaf Khan Bidlisi, Kurdish historian and poet
- Peter Short, English printer associated with works of Shakespeare
