= 1551 in literature =

List of years in literature	(table)
- … 1541; 1542; 1543; 1544; 1545; 1546; 1547; 1548; 1549; 1550; 1551; 1552; 1553; 1554; 1555; 1556; 1557; 1558; 1559; 1560; 1561 …
- Art; Archaeology; Architecture; Literature; Music; Philosophy; Science; +...

This article contains information about the literary events and publications of 1551.

== Events ==
- June 27 – Edict of Châteaubriant prohibits possessing any books listed on the University of Paris's Index, translating the Bible or works of the Church Fathers, importing books from Geneva or other places not under the Catholic Church's control, or printing or selling any religious books written in the last 40 years.
- unknown dates
  - Juan de Betanzos begins to write his "Narrative of the Incas".
  - An edition of the Book of Common Prayer printed by Humphrey Powell, de facto King's Printer in Dublin, becomes the first book printed in Ireland.
  - The first English language translation of Thomas More's Utopia (first published in Latin 1516), made by Ralph Robinson, is published in London.

== New books ==
=== Prose ===
- Bishop Mikael Agricola – Abckiria (second edition)
- John Calvin – De Scandalis
- Bartolomé de las Casas – Historia general de las Indias
- Andrzej Frycz Modrzewski – Commentariorum De Republica emendanda libri quinque (Five Books of Commentaries on the Improvement of Commonwealth)
- Stoglav (Стоглав, Book of One Hundred Chapters), collection of decisions of the Stoglavy Synod that regulated canon law etc. in the Tsardom of Russia, especially everyday life and mores of the clergy.

=== Drama ===
- Ludovico Ariosto (died 1533) – I suppositi (first publication in verse)
- Marin Držić – Dundo Maroje
- Hans Sachs – Das heiss Eisen
- Georg Wickram – Tobias

=== Poetry ===
- Lorenzo de Sepúlveda – Romances nueuamente sacados de historias antiguas de la crónica de España
- See also 1551 in poetry

== Births ==
- May 2 – William Camden, historian (died 1623)
- Unknown dates
  - Nikollë Bardhi, Albanian writer (died 1617)
  - Bhai Gurdas, Punjabi Sikh writer and preacher (died 1636)
  - Abdul-Haqq Dehlavi, Islamic scholar (died 1642)
  - Abu'l-Fazl ibn Mubarak, historian of the Mughal emperor Akbar (died 1602)

== Deaths ==
- January 17 – Pedro Mexía, Spanish Humanist philosopher and historian (born 1497)
- May 6 – Johannes Baptista Montanus, Italian medical writer (born 1498)
- May 17 – Shin Saimdang, Korean artist, calligraphist and poet (born 1504)
- Unknown date – Ludovico Pasquali, Dalmatian Italian poet (born c.1500)
