= 1537 in literature =

List of years in literature	(table)
- … 1527; 1528; 1529; 1530; 1531; 1532; 1533; 1534; 1535; 1536; 1537; 1538; 1539; 1540; 1541; 1542; 1543; 1544; 1545; 1546; 1547 …
- Art; Archaeology; Architecture; Literature; Music; Philosophy; Science; +...

This article contains information about the literary events and publications of 1537.

== Events ==
- February – The Institution of the Christian Man (also called The Bishops' Book), is written by a board of 46 divines and bishops headed by Thomas Cranmer. The purpose, like that of the Ten Articles of the previous year, is to implement the reforms of Henry VIII by separating from the Roman Catholic Church and reforming the Ecclesia Anglicana. "The work was a noble endeavor on the part of the bishops to promote unity, and to instruct the people in Church doctrine."
- December 28 – The Ordonnance de Montpellier initiates a legal deposit system for books in the Kingdom of France.
- Date unknown
  - Construction of the Biblioteca Marciana in Venice to the design of Jacopo Sansovino begins, continuing until 1560.
  - Paracelsus starts to write Astronomia Magna or the whole Philosophia Sagax of the Great and Little World.
  - Two complete Bible translations into English, both based on Tyndale's, appear:
    - Myles Coverdale's 1535 text is the first to be printed in England (by James Nicholson in Southwark, London).
    - The Matthew Bible edited by John Rogers under the pseudonym "Thomas Matthew", is printed in Antwerp.
  - The English scholar John Twyne publishes an edition of the late-medieval encyclopedic verse dialogue Sidrak and Bokkus, The history of kyng Boccus, Sydracke... translatyd by Hugo of Caumpeden, out of frenche into Englysshe.

== New books ==
=== Prose ===
- Francesco Guicciardini – La Historia d'Italia (History of Italy, to 1540)
- Martin Luther – Die Lügend von S. Johanne Chrysostomo

=== Drama ===
- Lazare de Baïf – translation of Sophocles' Electra
- Nicholas Udall (attrib.) – Thersites

== Births ==
- Unknown dates
  - Achille Gagliardi, Italian Jesuit writer (died 1607)
  - Jane Lumley, English translator from Greek and Latin (died 1578)
  - Thomas Preston, English dramatist and master of Trinity Hall, Cambridge (died 1598)
- Probable year – Bernardino de Escalante, Spanish priest, geographer and writer (died after 1605)

== Deaths ==
- May 10 – Andrzej Krzycki, Polish archbishop, humanist writer of Latin prose and Polish poetry (born 1482)
- September 24 – Jean Ruel, French physician and botanical writer (born 1474)
- Unknown date – Abdul Quddus Gangohi, Indian Sufi poet (born 1456)
