= 1531 in literature =

List of years in literature	(table)
- … 1521; 1522; 1523; 1524; 1525; 1526; 1527; 1528; 1529; 1530; 1531; 1532; 1533; 1534; 1535; 1536; 1537; 1538; 1539; 1540; 1541 …
- Art; Archaeology; Architecture; Literature; Music; Philosophy; Science; +...

This article contains information about the literary events and publications of 1531.

== Events ==
- unknown dates
  - The first emblem book appears, the Emblemata (Viri Clarissimi D. Andreae Alciati Iurisconsultiss. Mediol. Ad D. Chonradum Peutingerum Augustanum, Iurisconsultum Emblematum Liber), an unauthorized issue by the printer Heinrich Steyner in Augsburg, Bavaria, of Italian jurist Andrea Alciato's privately circulated Latin verses, accompanied by woodcuts.
  - Petrarch's poetry Trionfi (Triumphs) is first translated into French as Les Triomphes.

== New books ==
=== Prose ===
- Henry Cornelius Agrippa – De occulta philosophia libri tres, Book One
- Andrea Alciato – Emblemata
- Sir Thomas Elyot – The Boke Named the Governour (the first English work of moral philosophy)
- Niccolò Machiavelli (posthumous) – Discourses on Livy
- Paracelsus – Opus Paramirum (written in St. Gallen)
- Michael Servetus – De trinitatis erroribus (On the Errors of the Trinity)
- William Turner – A new herball, wherin are conteyned the names of herbes... (completed in 1568)

=== Drama ===
- Accademia degli Intronati – Gl' Ingannati

=== Poetry ===
- Marguerite de Navarre – Le Miroir de l'ame Pecheresse
- Approximate date – John Skelton – Colin Clout

== Births ==
- June 1 – János Zsámboky, Hungarian humanist scholar (died 1584)
- October 7 – Scipione Ammirato, Italian historian (died 1601)
- November 29 – Johannes Letzner, German historian (died 1613)
- Unknown date – Ercole Bottrigari, Italian poet, music theorist and publisher (died 1612)

== Deaths ==
- October 11 – Huldrych Zwingli, Swiss theologian (born 1484; killed in Second War of Kappel)
- probable – Fernán Pérez de Oliva, Spanish linguist (born c. 1492)
