= 1533 in literature =

List of years in literature	(table)
- … 1523; 1524; 1525; 1526; 1527; 1528; 1529; 1530; 1531; 1532; 1533; 1534; 1535; 1536; 1537; 1538; 1539; 1540; 1541; 1542; 1543 …
- Art; Archaeology; Architecture; Literature; Music; Philosophy; Science; +...

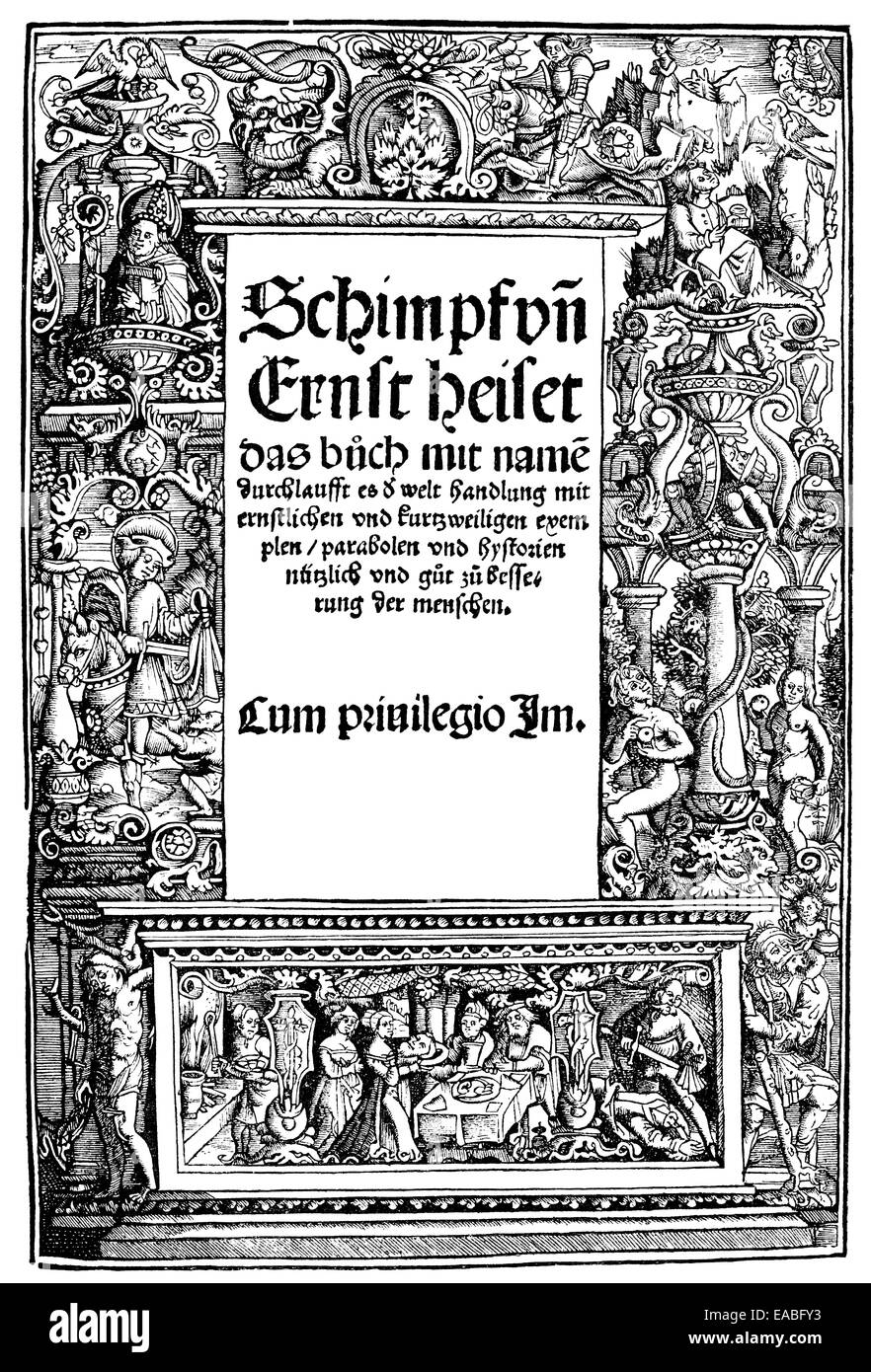

This article contains information about the literary events and publications of 1533.

== Events ==
- October – The censors of the Collège de Sorbonne stigmatize François Rabelais' Pantagruel as obscene.
- date unknown – French poet Maurice Sceve announces that he has found the tomb of "Laura", the woman who is the subject of so many poems by Petrarch, at the church of Santa Croce in Avignon, further strengthening French interest in the Italian poet.

== New books ==
=== Prose ===
- Henry Cornelius Agrippa – De occulta philosophia libri tres, Books 2 & 3
- Antoine Marcourt (as Pantople) – Le Livre des marchans
- Approximate year
  - Young Man of Arévalo
  - Brief Compendium of our Sacred Law and Sunna
  - Tafsira

=== Drama ===
- John Heywood
  - The Merry Play between Johan Johan the Husband, Tyb his Wife, and Sir Johan, the Priest (first published; written 1520)
  - The Mery Play between the Pardoner and the Frere, the Curate and Neybour Pratte (first published)
  - The Play of the Wether, a new and mery interlude of all maner of Wethers
  - The Play of Love

== Births ==
- January 2 – Johann Major, German poet and theologian (died 1600)
- January 3 – Jerónimo Bautista Lanuza, Spanish friar, bishop and homiletic writer (died 1624)
- June 6 – Bernardino Baldi, Italian mathematician, polymath and writer (died 1617)
- August 7 – Alonso de Ercilla, Spanish soldier and poet (died 1594)
- Unknown dates
  - Eknath, Marathi language religious poet in the Hindu tradition of India (died 1599)
  - Elazar ben Moshe Azikri, Jewish kabbalist, poet and writer (died 1600)
  - Andrea Rapicio, Italian poet writing in Latin (died 1573)
  - Sun Kehong (孫克弘), Chinese landscape painter, calligrapher and poet (died 1611)
  - (Or 1534) – Lucas Janszoon Waghenaer, Dutch cartographer (died 1606)

== Deaths ==
- July 6 – Ludovico Ariosto, Italian poet also writing Latin verse (born 1474)
- November 6 or 11 – Pieter Gillis, Flemish humanist, printer and Antwerp city official (born 1486)
- Unknown date – Giovanni Francesco Pico della Mirandola, Italian philosopher writing in Latin (born 1470)
