= 1542 in literature =

List of years in literature	(table)
- … 1532; 1533; 1534; 1535; 1536; 1537; 1538; 1539; 1540; 1541; 1542; 1543; 1544; 1545; 1546; 1547; 1548; 1549; 1550; 1551; 1552 …
- Art; Archaeology; Architecture; Literature; Music; Philosophy; Science; +...

This article contains information about the literary events and publications of 1542.

== Events ==
- The diary begun by Luca Landucci is completed by an unknown hand.
- The earliest written example of the Romani language appears.

== New books ==
=== Prose ===
- Paul Fagius – Liber Fidei seu Veritatis
- Edward Hall – The Union of the Two Noble and Illustrate Famelies of Lancastre & Yorke

=== Poetry ===
- See 1542 in poetry

== Births ==
- December – Catherine Des Roches, French poet and writer (died 1587)
- unknown date – John of the Cross (Juan de Yepes y Álvarez), Castilian poet and friar (died 1591)

== Deaths ==
- January 10 – Gerard Geldenhouwer, Dutch historian (born 1482)
- June 14 – Christoph von Scheurl, German humanist writer (born 1481)
- October 11 – Sir Thomas Wyatt, English poet (born 1503)
- unknown date – Lucas Fernández, Spanish dramatist and musician, who wrote in the Leonese language (born c. 1474)
