= 1555 in literature =

List of years in literature	(table)
- … 1545; 1546; 1547; 1548; 1549; 1550; 1551; 1552; 1553; 1554; 1555; 1556; 1557; 1558; 1559; 1560; 1561; 1562; 1563; 1564; 1565 …
- Art; Archaeology; Architecture; Literature; Music; Philosophy; Science; +...

This article contains information about the literary events and publications of 1555.

== Events ==
- unknown dates
  - The Portuguese humanist writer Achilles Statius relocates to Rome.
  - Roger Taverner is elected to the Parliament of England.
  - John Hooker becomes Chamberlain of Exeter.
  - The Facetious Nights of Straparola, a story collection by the Italian writer Giovanni Francesco Straparola originally published in 1550–1553, appears for the first time in a single volume.
  - The French humanist Christophe Plantin establishes the Plantin Press in Antwerp.

== New books ==
=== Prose ===
- Edmund Bonner – Homelies sette forth by Eddmune Byshop of London
- Gjon Buzuku – Meshari (first book published in the Albanian language).
- John Fisher (posthumously) – Treatyse concernynge the Fruytfull Sayings of Davyd
- Fracastoro – Naugerius
- Iacob Heraclid – De Marini quod Terovanum vocant atque Hedini expugnatione
- Alonso de Molina – Aquí comiença un vocabulario en la lengua castellana y mexicana
- Olaus Magnus – Historia de Gentibus Septentrionalibus
- Jacques Peletier du Mans – L'Art poétique (The Art of Poetry)
- Nicholas Ridley – A Brief Declaration of the Lorde's Supper
- William Turner – A New Book of Spiritual Physick
- Georg Wickram – Das Rollwagenbuchlein

=== Drama ===
- Étienne Jodelle – Didon se sacrifiant

=== Poetry ===
- Joachim du Bellay – Les Regrets

== Births ==
- June 11 – Lodovico Zacconi, Italian theologian and music writer (died 1627)
- December 27 – Johann Arndt, German theologian (died 1621)
- Unknown dates
  - Lancelot Andrewes, English scholar and bishop (died 1626)
  - Richard Carew, English translator and antiquary (died 1620)
  - John Doddridge, English antiquary, lawyer and writer (died 1628)
  - Moderata Fonte, Venetian writer and poet (died 1592)
  - François de Malherbe, French poet, critic and translator (died 1628)
  - Thomas Watson, English poet writing in English and Latin (died 1592)

== Deaths ==
- February 9 – Christian Egenolff, German printer and publisher (born 1502)
- April 18 – Polydore Vergil, English Tudor historian (born c. 1470)
- July 2 – Girolamo dai Libri, Italian illuminator (born c. 1475)
- October 9 – Justus Jonas, Lutheran theologian and hymn-writere (born 1493)
- Unknown date – Petrus Gyllius, French natural scientist and translator (born 1490)
