= 1538 in literature =

List of years in literature	(table)
- … 1528; 1529; 1530; 1531; 1532; 1533; 1534; 1535; 1536; 1537; 1538; 1539; 1540; 1541; 1542; 1543; 1544; 1545; 1546; 1547; 1548 …
- Art; Archaeology; Architecture; Literature; Music; Philosophy; Science; +...

This article contains information about the literary events and publications of 1538.

== Events ==
- December 20 – Pietro Bembo is made a Cardinal.

== New books ==
=== Prose ===
- Hélisenne de Crenne – Les Angoisses douloureuses qui procèdent d'amours
- Sir Thomas Elyot – The dictionary of syr Thomas Eliot knyght (Latin to English)
- Paracelsus – Astronomia Magna or the whole Philosophia Sagax of the Great and Little World
- William Turner – Libellus de re herbaria (Handbook of Herbs)

=== Drama ===
- John Bale
  - Kynge Johan, the earliest known English historical drama (in verse)
  - Three Laws of Nature, Moses and Christ, corrupted by the Sodomytes, Pharisees and Papystes most wicked
- Georg Wickram – Der treue Eckart

=== Poetry ===
- Sir David Lyndsay – The Complaynte and Testament of a Popinjay
- Clément Marot – Œuvres de Clément Marot

== Births ==
- December 10 – Giovanni Battista Guarini, Italian poet, dramatist and diplomat (died 1612)

== Deaths ==
- unknown dates
  - Germain de Brie, French humanist scholar and poet (born 1490)
  - Pierre Gringoire, French poet and playwright (born c.1475)
