= 1539 in literature =

List of years in literature	(table)
- … 1529; 1530; 1531; 1532; 1533; 1534; 1535; 1536; 1537; 1538; 1539; 1540; 1541; 1542; 1543; 1544; 1545; 1546; 1547; 1548; 1549 …
- Art; Archaeology; Architecture; Literature; Music; Philosophy; Science; +...

This article contains information about the literary events and publications of 1539.

== Events ==
- April – Printing of the Great Bible (The Byble in Englyshe) is completed; it is distributed to churches in England. Prepared by Myles Coverdale, it contains much material from the Tyndale Bible – unacknowledged as the Tyndale version is officially deemed heretical.
- Unknown dates
  - Game Place House in Great Yarmouth becomes the first place in England to be used regularly as a public theatre.
  - Marie Dentière writes an open letter to Marguerite of Navarre, sister of King Francis I of France. This Epistre tres utile (very useful letter) calls for an expulsion of Catholic clergy from France.
  - The first printing press in North America is set up in Mexico City. The first known book from it, Manual de Adultos, appears in 1540.
  - Teseo Ambrogio's Introductio in Chaldaicam lingua, Syriaca atq Armenica, & dece alias linguas, published in Pavia, introduces several Middle Eastern languages to Western Europe for the first time.

== New books ==
=== Prose ===
- Robert Estienne – Alphabetum Hebraicum
- Martin Luther – On the Councils and the Church

== Births ==
- February 27 – Franciscus Raphelengius, Flemish-born Dutch scholar, printer and bookseller (died 1597)
- March 5 – Christoph Pezel, German theologian (died 1604)
- April 12 – Garcilaso de la Vega, Spanish Peruvian mestizo chronicler (died 1616)
- December 5 – Fausto Paolo Sozzini, Italian theologian (died 1604)
- December 20 – Paulus Melissus, German writer in Latin, translator and composer (died 1602)
- Unknown dates
  - Olivier de Serres, French writer on agriculture and horticulture (died 1619)
  - Jean de Tournes, French author, printer and bookseller (died 1615)
  - Richard White of Basingstoke, English jurist and historian (died 1611)

== Deaths ==
- March 5 – Kaspar Ursinus Velius, German scholar, poet and historian (born c. 1493)
- May 7 – Ottaviano Petrucci, Italian printer (born 1466)
- July 5 – Anthony Maria Zaccaria, Italian religious writer, leader of the Counter-reformation and saint (born 1502)
- July 12 – Ferdinand Columbus, Spanish bibliographer and cosmographer (born 1488)
- August 10 – Lanspergius, German Carthusian monk and ascetic writer (born 1489)
- November 25 – Johann Alexander Brassicanus, German author and teacher (born c. 1500)
- Unknown date – Gabriel Alonso de Herrera, Spanish author of an agricultural treatise (born 1470)
