= 1602 in literature =

List of years in literature	(table)
- … 1592; 1593; 1594; 1595; 1596; 1597; 1598; 1599; 1600; 1601; 1602; 1603; 1604; 1605; 1606; 1607; 1608; 1609; 1610; 1611; 1612 …
- Art; Archaeology; Architecture; Literature; Music; Philosophy; Science; +...

This article contains information about the literary events and publications of 1602.

== Events ==
- February 2 – The Lord Chamberlain's Men perform Twelfth Night at the Middle Temple in London.
- May – Henry Wotton returns to Florence having disclosed a plot to murder King James VI of Scotland.
- May 4 – Richard Hakluyt is installed as prebendary of Westminster Abbey.
- November 8 – The Bodleian Library at the University of Oxford opens to scholars.
- November 22 – Samuel Rowley and William Bird(e) (or Borne) are paid by the Admiral's Men for additions to Christopher Marlowe's play Doctor Faustus.

== New books ==
=== Prose ===
- Tommaso Campanella – The City of the Sun (La città del sole, a philosophical work, one of the most important utopias)
- Thomas Campion – Observations in the Art of English Poetry
- Richard Carew – A Survey of Cornwall
- Cipriano de Valera (rev.) – 'Reina-Valera' (Spanish translation of the Bible)
- Sir Hugh Plat – Delightes for Ladies (book of recipes and household hints)

=== Drama ===
- Anonymous – A Larum for London, or The Siedge of Antwerpe with the ventrous actes and valorous deeds of the lame soldier published
- Henry Chettle – Hoffmann
- John Davies of Hereford – Mirum in Modum
- Thomas Dekker (with Thomas Middleton?) – Blurt, Master Constable, or The Spaniards Night-Walke published
- Ben Jonson – The Poetaster published
- Sir David Lyndsay (died c. 1555) – Humanity and Sensuality and A Satire of the Three Estates published
- John Marston – Antonio and Mellida published
- William Percy – A Country Tragaedye in Vacunium and The Aphrodysial, or, Sea-Feast: a Marinall (approximate date)
- William Shakespeare – Hamlet performed (latest date), The Merry Wives of Windsor published, Troilus and Cressida probable completion date
- "W.S." – Thomas Lord Cromwell published

=== Poetry ===
- Giambattista Marino – Le Rime
- Cristóbal de Virués – El Monserrate segundo

== Births ==
- March 29 – John Lightfoot, English theologian (died 1675)
- April 30 – Robert Baillie, Scottish divine and historian (died 1662)
- May 2 – Athanasius Kircher, German scholar (died 1680)
- May 10 – Samuel Newman, American Biblical commentator (died 1663)
- October or November – Dudley North, English poet, writer and politician (died 1677)
- Unknown date – Juan Pérez de Montalbán, Spanish dramatist and poet (died 1638)
- Approximate year – Owen Feltham, English essayist (died 1668)

== Deaths ==
- February 13 – Alexander Nowell, English theologian (born c. 1507)
- September 14 – Jean Passerat, French poet and satirist (born 1534)
- October 13 – Franciscus Junius (the elder), Swiss theologian (born 1545)
- October 30 – Jean-Jacques Boissard, French poet (born 1528)
- Unknown date – Jean Pithou, French legal writer (born 1534)
