= 1661 in literature =

This article presents lists of the literary events and publications in 1661.

== Events ==
- August 24 – Samuel Pepys sees the new production of Hamlet by Sir William Davenant's troupe of actors, the Duke's Company, with the innovation of stage scenery. The Duke's Company have recently moved from the Salisbury Court Theatre to the theatre at Lincoln's Inn Fields, where they have been joined by Thomas Betterton; Pepys praises Betterton's Prince Hamlet as "beyond imagination."
- December 28 – Controversial author James Harrington is arrested on a charge of conspiracy, while working on his final publication, A System of Politics.
- Unknown dates
  - The Book of Kells (c. 800) is presented to Trinity College Dublin.
  - Bishop John Gauden claims authorship of Eikon Basilike (1649).
  - Third edition of Izaak Walton's The Compleat Angler.
  - The trend toward closet drama (often highly politicized), which distinguished the English Civil War and Interregnum periods, does not immediately end once the theatres re-open with the Restoration — as the publication of Hell's High Court of Justice (below) illustrates.
  - Abraham Cowley's pamphlet The Advancement of Experimental Philosophy helps inspire the foundation of the Royal Society.
  - The library of Frederick William, Elector of Brandenburg, is opened to the public at Cölln as the "Library of the Elector" (German: Churfürstliche Bibliothek zu Cölln an der Spree), foundation of the Berlin State Library.
  - A legal deposit obligation is laid on publishers in Sweden.
  - Francis Kirkman, in Westminster (London) operates an early form of lending library, based on a collection of his own works.

== New books ==
=== Prose ===
- Robert Boyle – The Sceptical Chymist
- Gauthier de Costes, seigneur de la Calprenède – Faramond (Pharamond)
- Abraham Cowley – The Advancement of Experimental Philosophy
- Sir Robert Dudley – Dell'Arcano del Mare
- John Evelyn – Tyrannus, or The Mode
- Marchamont Nedham – A Short History of the English Rebellion
- Katarina Zrinska – Putni tovaruš

=== Drama ===
- Anonymous ("J. D.") – Hell's High Court of Justice, or the Trial of the Three Politic Ghosts, viz. Oliver Cromwell, the King of Sweden, and Cardinal Mazarin (published)
- George Villiers, Duke of Buckingham (after Fletcher) – The Chances
- Pedro Calderón de la Barca – Las tres justicias en una
- George Cartwright – The Heroic Lover, or the Infanta of Spain (published)
- Thomas Corneille – Camma
- Abraham Cowley – The Cutter of Coleman Street
- Robert Davenport – The City Nightcap (published)
- Richard Flecknoe – Erminia, or the Fair and Virtuous Lady (published)
- John Fountain – The Rewards of Virtue (published)
- Thomas Fuller – Andronicus (published)
- Francis Kirkman – The Presbyterian Lash (published)
- Thomas Middleton – Hengist, King of Kent (published)
- Molière – Dom Garcie de Navarre, ou le Prince jaloux
- Roger Boyle, 1st Earl of Orrery – The Generall (written)
- William Rowley & Thomas Heywood (?) – The Thracian Wonder (published); previously misattributed to Webster, exact authorship still uncertain, probably written c.1600/10
- Samuel Tuke – The Adventures of Five Hours (published adaptation of Antonio Coello's Los empeños de seis horas, c. 1642)
- John Webster & William Rowley – A Cure for a Cuckold (published)

== Births ==
- January 30 – Charles Rollin, French historian and educator (died 1741)
- April 16 – Charles Montagu, 1st Earl of Halifax, English poet and statesman (died 1715)
- April – Anne Finch, Countess of Winchilsea, English poet (died 1720)
- May 25 – Claude Buffier, French philosopher, historian and educationalist (died 1737)
- November 1 – Florent Carton Dancourt, French dramatist and actor (died 1725)
- November 8 – Elizabeth Burnet, English religious writer and philanthropist (died 1709)
- November 15 – Christoph von Graffenried, Swiss colonist and writer (died 1743)
- Unknown dates
  - William Cleland, Scottish poet and soldier (died 1689)
  - Thomas Knaggs, English preacher and publisher of sermons (died 1724)

== Deaths ==
- March 30 – François le Métel de Boisrobert, French poet (born 1592)
- June 13 – Richard Adams, English poet (born 1619)
- August 7 – Jin Shengtan (金聖歎), Chinese editor, writer and critic (born c. 1610)
- October 4 – Jacqueline Pascal, poet and dramatist, sister of Blaise Pascal (born 1625)
- November 29 – Bishop Brian Walton, English scholar responsible for Polyglot Bible (born 1600)
- December 29 – Antoine Girard de Saint-Amant, French poet (born 1594)
- Unknown date – Sarmad Kashani, Persian poet and mystic (executed)
