= 1589 in literature =

This article presents lists of the literary events and publications in 1589.

== Events ==
- January – The Children of Paul's perform twice at the English royal court during the first two weeks of the year.
- March – Marprelate Controversy: Bishop Thomas Cooper's Admonition prompts Marprelate's response in the form of a tract entitled Hay any Worke for Cooper.
- July – John Penry's printing press produces two tracts purporting to be by sons of Martin Marprelate, but probably by Martin himself: Theses Martinianae by "Martin Junior", and The Just Censure of Martin Junior by "Martin Senior".
- 1588–1589 – This is the earliest probable date for the composition of Christopher Marlowe's The Tragicall History of the Life and Death of Doctor Faustus and its first performance, in London.

== New books ==
=== Prose ===
- Jane Anger – Jane Anger her protection for women, to defend them against the scandalous reportes of a late surfeiting lover, and all other like venerians that complaine so to bee overcloyed with women's kindnesse
- Thoinot Arbeau – Orchésographie
- Giovanni Botero – Della ragione di Stato (The Reason of State)
- Robert Greene – Menaphon
- Richard Hakluyt – The Principal Navigations, Voiages, Traffiques and Discoueries of the English Nation, vol. 1
- John Lyly (attr.) – Pappe with an Hatchet (Part of the Marprelate Controversy)
- George Puttenham (probable author) – The Arte of English Poesie
- Lorenzo Scupoli – Il combattimento spirituale
- Water Margin (水浒传, Shui Hu Zhuan; earliest known complete printed edition)

=== Drama ===
- Girolamo Bargagli – La Pellegrina (The Pilgrim Woman)
- Robert Greene – Friar Bacon and Friar Bungay
- Thomas Kyd? – Hamlet (the "Ur-Hamlet", latest date)
- Christopher Marlowe – The Jew of Malta (probably written 1589–90)
- George Peele? – The Troublesome Reign of King John (approximate year)
- The Rare Triumphs of Love and Fortune (anonymous; published)

=== Poetry ===
- Anne Dowriche (AD) – The French Historie
- Christopher Marlowe – The Passionate Shepherd to His Love

== Births ==
- March 3 – Gisbertus Voetius, Dutch Calvinist theologian (died 1676)
- Unknown dates
  - Heinrich Petraeus, German physician and writer (died 1620)
  - Antonio de León Pinelo, Peru-born Spanish historian (died c. 1675)

== Deaths ==
- March 22 – Lodovico Guicciardini, Italian merchant and writer (born 1521)
- March 23 – Marcin Kromer, Polish historian (born 1512)
- July 1 – Christophe Plantin, French-born Dutch printer (born c. 1520)
- August 31 – Jurij Dalmatin, Slovenian writer and translator (born c. 1547)
- September 16 – Michael Baius, Belgian theologian (born 1513)
- September 19 – Jean-Antoine de Baïf, French poet (born 1532)
- October 12 – Samuel de Medina, Talmudist and author from Thessaloniki (born 1505)
- October 15 – Jacopo Zabarella, Italian philosopher (born 1532)
- Unknown date – Thomas Sampson, English theologian and translator (born c. 1517)
