= 1543 in literature =

List of years in literature	(table)
- … 1533; 1534; 1535; 1536; 1537; 1538; 1539; 1540; 1541; 1542; 1543; 1544; 1545; 1546; 1547; 1548; 1549; 1550; 1551; 1552; 1553 …
- Art; Archaeology; Architecture; Literature; Music; Philosophy; Science; +...

This article contains information about the literary events and publications of 1543.

== Events ==
- unknown date – In France:
  - The Faculty of Theology of the University of Paris issues its first Index of prohibited (religious) books.
  - Guillaume Rouillé sets up as a bookseller in Lyon.

== New books ==
=== Prose ===
- Mikael Agricola – Abckiria (first book printed in Finnish)
- Nicolaus Copernicus – De revolutionibus orbium coelestium (On the Revolution of the Heavenly Spheres)
- Martin Luther – Vom Schem Hamphoras
- Fernán Pérez de Oliva, completed by Francisco Cervantes de Salazar – Dialogo de la dignidad del hombre
- Andreas Vesalius – De humani corporis fabrica libri septem (On the Fabric of the Human Body, in Seven Books)
- Benefizio della Morte di Cristo ("The Benefit of Christ's Death", attributed to Aonio Paleario)

=== Drama ===
- Lodovico Dolce – Hecuba

=== Poetry ===
- See 1543 in poetry

== Births ==
- February 4 – Giovanni Francesco Fara, Sardinian historian, geographer and clergyman
- February 25 – Sharaf Khan Bidlisi, politician, historian and poet (died 1603)
- November 2 – Kasper Franck, German theologian (died 1584)
- Unknown dates
  - Louis Bellaud, Occitan language writer and poet (died 1588)
  - Thomas Deloney, silk weaver and writer (died in or before 1600 in literature)
  - Bartosz Paprocki, Polish and Czech historiographer, translator and poet (died 1614)
  - Thomas Twyne, Elizabethan translator and physician (died 1613)
  - Antonio Veneziano, Sicilian poet (died 1593)

== Deaths ==
- May 24 – Nicolaus Copernicus, Polish Renaissance mathematician and astronomer (born 1473)
- July 19 – Berthold of Chiemsee, German theologian (born 1465)
- Unknown date – Jan Dubčanský ze Zdenína, Moravian nobleman, printer of Moravia's first Czech-language book (born 1490)
