= 1679 in literature =

This article contains information about the literary events and publications of 1679.

== Events ==
- April 30 – John Locke, returning to England from France, moves into Thanet House in London.
- June – Nathaniel Lee's play The Massacre at Paris (about the St. Bartholomew's Day massacre of 1572, as was Christopher Marlowe's play of the same title) is suppressed by King Charles II of England as anti-French, the French being English allies at this time.
- August – Thomas Otway returns to England from military service in the Netherlands.
- October – Thomas Otway's The History and Fall of Caius Marius, his adaptation of Romeo and Juliet, is first performed. It will drive Shakespeare's original off the stage for more than sixty years.
- December 18 – Rose Alley ambuscade: John Dryden is set upon by three assailants in London, thought to have been instigated by John Wilmot, 2nd Earl of Rochester in retaliation for an attack on "want of wit" in his poetry in The Essay on Satire (nominally by Dryden's patron, the poet John Sheffield, Earl of Musgrave, but probably with input from Dryden).
- unknown dates
  - Étienne Baluze becomes almoner to King Louis XIV.
  - Pu Songling probably compiles most of his Strange Stories from a Chinese Studio.

== New books ==
=== Prose ===
- Charles Blount – Anima Mundi
- Jean de La Fontaine – The Fables of Bidpai

=== Drama ===
- Beaumont and Fletcher – Fifty Comedies and Tragedies, the second folio
- John Bancroft – Sertorius
- Aphra Behn
  - The Feigned Courtesans
  - The Young King
- John Crowne – The Ambitious Statesman
- Thomas D'Urfey – The Virtuous Wife
- John Dryden
  - Oedipus (adapted from Sophocles' Oedipus Rex with Nathaniel Lee, published)
  - Troilus and Cressida, or Truth Found Too Late (adapted from Shakespeare's Troilus and Cressida)
- Nathaniel Lee
  - Caesar Borgia
  - The Massacre of Paris
- Thomas Otway – The History and Fall of Caius Marius
- Jacques Pradon – La Troade
- Thomas Shadwell
  - A True Widow
  - The Woman Captain

=== Poetry ===
- "Ephelia" (Mary Villiers?) – Female Poems...by Ephelia

== Births ==
- January 24 – Christian Wolff, German philosopher (died 1745)
- August 16 – Catherine Trotter Cockburn, English novelist, dramatist and philosopher (died 1749)
- September 11 – Thomas Parnell, Irish poet and cleric (died 1718)
- September 24 – Eugenio Gerardo Lobo, Spanish poet and soldier (died 1750)
- September 26 – Johann Gottlob Carpzov, German Biblical scholar (died 1767)
- October 26 – Heinrich Jacob Bashuysen, German printer (died c. 1750)
- Unknown dates
  - Charles Johnson, English dramatist and poet (died 1748)
  - George Psalmanazar, French-born imposter and English writer (died 1763)
  - Robert Wodrow, Scottish historian (died 1734)
- Probable year of birth – Penelope Aubin, English novelist and translator (died c. 1731)

== Deaths ==
- January 11 – Joannes Lucius, Dalmatian historian (born 1604)
- February 5 – Joost van den Vondel, Dutch dramatist (born 1587)
- April 4 – Christian Hoffmann von Hoffmannswaldau, German poet (born 1616)
- June 7 – Alice Curwen, English autobiographer and Quaker (born c. 1619)
- August 27 – Jonas Moore, English mathematician and surveyor (born 1617)
- October 12 – William Gurnall, English writer and cleric (born 1617)
- October 26 – Roger Boyle, 1st Earl of Orrery Irish dramatist and soldier (born 1621)
- December 4 – Thomas Hobbes, English philosopher (born 1588)
- Unknown dates
  - Jacob Alting, Dutch philologist and theologian (born 1618)
  - Johann Michael Vansleb, German theologian and linguist (born 1635)
