= Catholic propaganda =

Catholic propaganda may refer to:

- The activity of the Sacred Congregation for the Propagation of the Faith
- The activity of the Congregation (Roman Curia) during the Counter-Reformation

== See also ==
- Propaganda during the Reformation
