= 1608 in literature =

This article contains information about the literary events and publications of 1608.

== Events ==
- January 10 – Ben Jonson's The Masque of Beauty is performed by Queen Anne and her retinue at the Banqueting House, Whitehall, a sequel to The Masque of Blackness.
- February 9 – Another masque by Jonson, The Hue and Cry After Cupid, is performed at the Banqueting House, with sets designed by Inigo Jones.
- March 31 – Hamlet is played aboard the East India Company ship Red Dragon, commanded by Capt. William Keeling.
- April – Performances of George Chapman's play The Conspiracy and Tragedy of Charles, Duke of Byron by the Children of the Chapel at the Blackfriars Theatre in London are suppressed after the French Ambassador complains to King James. After June the play is published with the offensive passages suppressed.
- May–October – Thomas Coryat makes a walking tour of continental Europe.
- June 12–August 19 – Juan Ruiz de Alarcón returns to Mexico from Spain, to take up an academic post.
- June 19 – Thomas Overbury is knighted.
- August – Richard Burbage with fellow members of the King's Men (playing company), including Shakespeare, take direct control of the indoor Blackfriars Theatre in London as a winter playhouse, also taking over the plays and playwrights previously presented there by the Children of the Chapel.
- unknown dates
  - Henry Ainsworth publishes a response to Richard Bernard's The Separatist Schisme.
  - Father Francisco Blancas de San Jose establishes a printing press at Abucay Church in the Philippines to produce books in the Spanish and Tagalog languages; Tomas Pinpin joins the staff the following year.
  - Scottish poet Arthur Johnston goes to Italy to study medicine at Padua.
  - The Morgan Bible is given by Cardinal Bernard Maciejowski, Bishop of Cracow, to Abbas I (Shah of Persia).

== New books ==
=== Prose ===
- George Abbot – A Brief Description of the Whole World
- Robert Armin – A Nest of Ninnies
- Thomas Dekker
  - The Dead Term
  - The Bellman of London
- Francesco Maria Guazzo – Compendium Maleficarum
- Johannes Kepler – Somnium (written; published posthumously in 1634)
- Mathurin Régnier – Les Premieres d'Euvres ou Satyres de Regnier
- Salomon Schweigger – Newe Reyßbeschreibung Teutschland Auss to Constantinople
- "P. F." – The History of the Damnable Life and Deserved Death of Doctor John Faustus

=== Drama ===
- Lording Barry – Ram Alley (published)
- George Chapman – The Conspiracy and Tragedy of Charles, Duke of Byron
- John Day – Humour Out of Breath and Law Tricks (published)
- Lope de Vega
  - El acero de Madrid ("The steel of Madrid")
  - La adúltera perdonada (autos sacramentales)
  - Lo fingido verdadero ("What you Pretend Has Become Real")
  - Los melindres de Belisa
  - Peribáñez y el Comendador de Ocaña
- John Fletcher – The Faithful Shepherdess (first performance)
- Thomas Heywood – The Rape of Lucrece (published)
- Ben Jonson
  - The Masque of Beauty (performed, and published with The Masque of Blackness)
  - The Hue and Cry After Cupid (performed and published)
- Henry Machin and Gervase Markham – The Dumb Knight
- The Merry Devil of Edmonton (attributed to Thomas Dekker, Michael Drayton, William Shakespeare and others; published; first performed by 1604)
- Thomas Middleton
  - The Family of Love, A Mad World, My Masters, and A Trick to Catch the Old One (published)
  - A Yorkshire Tragedy (attributed; published with attribution to "W. Shakspeare")
- John Sansbury – Periander
- William Shakespeare – King Lear (published)

=== Poetry ===
- See 1608 in poetry

== Births ==
- February 6 – António Vieira, Portuguese Jesuit orator and writer (died 1697)
- February 12 – Daniello Bartoli, Jesuit writer (died 1685)
- June 19 (bapt.) – Thomas Fuller, English cleric and historian (died 1661)
- June – Richard Fanshawe, English Royalist politician, diplomat, poet and translator (died 1666)
- December 8 – Vendela Skytte, Swedish salonist and poet (died 1629)
- December 9 – John Milton, English poet and author (died 1674)
- Unknown date – Antoine Le Maistre, French lawyer, author and translator (died 1658)

== Deaths ==
- January 28 – Enrique Henríquez, Portuguese Jesuit theologian (born 1536)
- February 16 – Nicolas Rapin, French translator, poet and satirist (born 1535)
- February 26
  - Thomas Craig, Scottish poet (born c. 1538)
  - John Still, English bishop, once credited with writing Gammer Gurton's Needle (born c. 1543)
- March 29 – Laurence Tomson, English theologian (born 1539)
- April 19 – Thomas Sackville, 1st Earl of Dorset, statesman and poet (born 1536)
- June 19
  - Alberico Gentili, Italian legal writer (born 1552)
  - Johann Pistorius (the younger), German controversialist and historian (born 1546)
- July 26 – Pablo de Céspedes, Spanish poet and artist (born 1538)
- September – Mary Shakespeare, English mother of Shakespeare (born c. 1540)
- October 19
  - Martin Delrio, Netherlandish-born Spanish theologian (born 1551)
  - Geoffrey Fenton, English writer and politician (born c. 1539)
- before December – George Bannatyne, Scottish collector of Scottish poems (born 1545)
- Unknown date – Nicolas de Montreux, French novelist, poet and dramatist (born c. 1561)
- Probable year – Jean Vauquelin de la Fresnaye, French poet (born 1536)
