= The Wounds of Civil War =

1594 play by Thomas Lodge

The Wounds of Civil War is an Elizabethan era stage play, written by Thomas Lodge. A dramatization of the ancient Roman conflict between Marius and Sulla, the play is generally considered Lodge's only extant solo drama.

== Publication ==
The Wounds of Civil War was entered into the Stationers' Register on 24 May 1594, and was published in quarto later that year by the bookseller John Danter. The title page of the quarto identifies Lodge as the author, and states that the play was performed by the Admiral's Men. The 1594 quarto is the only publication of the play before the nineteenth century.

== Date ==
The date of the authorship and premier performance of the play is not known with certainty. Many scholars have considered the scene in Act III that includes a chariot drawn by four Moors as an imitation of the famous similar scene in Marlowe's Tamburlaine, indicating that Lodge's play must post-date Marlowe's. The Wounds of Civil War is generally dated to the 1587–92 period. (A minority view allows the possibility the Lodge's play may have pre-dated Marlowe's, and that Marlowe may have been influenced by Lodge.)

== Sources ==
Lodge's primary source on the First Civil War in ancient Rome was the Roman History of Appian; an English translation of Appian's work, by "W. B.," had been published by Henry Bynneman in 1578. Lodge departs from his source when it suits his purposes, as in elevating the minor figure Junius Brutus into a significant character. Lodge condemns militarism and tyranny as leading to civil disruption; he favors the unifying influences of a balanced, moderate, and just society. (Lodge conceived of Elizabethan England as that type of society, and was a conservative defender of the existing social order against potential change and "innovation.")
