= 1544 in literature =

List of years in literature	(table)
- … 1534; 1535; 1536; 1537; 1538; 1539; 1540; 1541; 1542; 1543; 1544; 1545; 1546; 1547; 1548; 1549; 1550; 1551; 1552; 1553; 1554 …
- Art; Archaeology; Architecture; Literature; Music; Philosophy; Science; +...

This article contains information about the literary events and publications of 1544.

== Events ==
- Summer – The engraver and publisher Cornelis Bos relocates from Antwerp to Paris, after becoming involved with an antisacerdotalist, free-thinking spiritualist sect. In his absence, he is declared to be exiled by the Council of Brabant.
- December 31 – Eleven-year-old Princess Elizabeth of England presents her stepmother, Catherine Parr, with a manuscript book entitled The Miroir or Glasse of the Synneful Soul.
- unknown dates
  - The University of Paris prohibits the printing of any book not approved by the appropriate University officials.
  - The first (partial) Latin translation of Achilles Tatius' Leucippe and Clitophon, made by Annibal della Croce (Crucejus), is published in Lyon.

== New books ==
=== Prose ===
- Cardinal John Fisher – Psalmi seu precationes (posthumous) in an anonymous English translation by its sponsor, Catherine Parr, queen of King Henry VIII of England
- John Leland – Assertio inclytissimi Arturii regis Britanniae
- Sebastian Münster – Cosmographia
- Guillaume Postel – De orbis terrae concordia
- Domingo de Vico – Los Proverbios de Salomón, las Epístolas y los Evangelios de todo el año, en lengua mexicana ("The Proverbs of Solomon, the Epistles and Gospels for the whole year, in the Mexican tongue"; later prohibited by the Spanish Inquisition)
- Sefer HaYashar, printed in Venice
- Michael Stifel – Arithmetica integra
- Tripartito del Christianissimo y consolatorio doctor Juan Gerson, the first Mexican book with woodcut illustrations, published by Juan Pablos.
- William Turner – Avium praecipuarum, quarum apud Plinium et Aristotelem mentio est, brevis et succincta historia (Brief and Succinct Account of Chief Birds Mentioned by Pliny and Aristotle; first English book devoted wholly to birds)
- Vidus Vidius – Chirurgia

=== Poetry ===
- See also 1544 in poetry
- Clément Marot – Œuvres (definitive edition)

== Births ==
- May 24 – William Gilbert, astronomer and natural philosopher (died 1603)

== Deaths ==
- September 12 – Clément Marot, French poet (born 1496)
- December – Denis Janot, French printer
- Unknown dates
  - Pedro Damiano, Portuguese chess player and writer (born 1480)
  - Nilakantha Somayaji, Keralan mathematician and astronomer (born 1444)
