= 1554 in literature =

List of years in literature	(table)
- … 1544; 1545; 1546; 1547; 1548; 1549; 1550; 1551; 1552; 1553; 1554; 1555; 1556; 1557; 1558; 1559; 1560; 1561; 1562; 1563; 1564 …
- Art; Archaeology; Architecture; Literature; Music; Philosophy; Science; +...

This article contains information about the literary events and publications of 1554.

== Events ==
- January 25 – Missionary, writer and poet José de Anchieta is one of the founders of the city of São Paulo, Brazil.
- unknown date – Publication of Menno Simons' Uytgangh ofte bekeeringhe

== New books ==
=== Prose ===
- Matteo Bandello
  - Novelle
  - Prima Parte
- Edmund Bonner – Profitable and Necessary Doctryne
- Charles Estienne – Praedium Rusticum
- Johannes Magnus – Historia de omnibus gothorum sueonumque regibus (History of all Kings of Goths and Swedes)
- Tepetlaoztoc Codex
- Lazarillo de Tormes (anonymous)
- Adrianus Turnebus's edition of Corpus Hermeticum
- Approximate year:
- Título de Totonicapán (anonymous Kʼicheʼ language document)

=== Poetry ===
- Anacreontea (Greek poems of 1st century BC – 6th century AD, published for first time by Henri Estienne)

== Births ==
- March 22 – Catherine de Parthenay, French Huguenot noblewoman, mathematician, poet, playwright and translator (died 1631)
- October 20 – Bálint Balassi, Hungarian poet (died 1594)
- November 11 – Luis de la Puente, Spanish theologian (died 1624)
- November 30 – Sir Philip Sidney, English soldier and poet (died 1586)
- Unknown date – Anrakuan Sakuden, Japanese poet (died 1642)
- probable – Sir Walter Raleigh, writer, poet, soldier, courtier, spy and explorer (died 1618)

== Deaths ==
- January 16 – Christiern Pedersen, Danish scholar, writer and printer (born c. 1480)
- April 23 – Gaspara Stampa, Italian poet (born 1523)
- June 24 – Feliciano de Silva, Spanish writer (born c. 1491)
- September 8 – Johann Wild, German Bible commentator (born 1497)
