= 1607 in literature =

This article contains information about the literary events and publications of 1607.

== Events ==
- January 22 – Shortly before his death, bookseller Cuthbert Burby transfers the rights to print the text of The Taming of the Shrew to Nicholas Ling.
- February 2 – The King's Men perform Barnabe Barnes's anti-Catholic tragedy The Devil's Charter at the English Court.
- June 5 – Physician John Hall marries Susanna, daughter of William Shakespeare, at the Church of the Holy Trinity, Stratford-upon-Avon.
- September 5 – Hamlet is performed aboard the East India Company ship Red Dragon, under the command of Captain William Keeling, anchored off the coast of Sierra Leone, the first known performance of a Shakespeare play outside England in English, and the first by amateurs.
- September 30 – Richard II is performed aboard the Dragon.
- unknown dates
  - First performance of the first wholly parodic play in English, Francis Beaumont's The Knight of the Burning Pestle, unsuccessfully, probably by child actors at the Blackfriars Theatre in London.
  - The King's Revels Children are active as a playing company in London: their repertoire includes Edward Sharpham's Cupid's Whirligig and Thomas Middleton's The Family of Love.

== New books ==
=== Prose ===
- William Alabaster – Apparatus in Revelationem Jesu Christi
- Caesar Baronius and Odorico Raynaldi - Annales Ecclesiastici (final edition)
- John Cowell – The Interpreter (suppressed by the English House of Commons for excessive royalism)
- Michael Drayton – The Legend of Great Cromwell
- Richard Johnson
  - The Pleasant Walks of Moorefields
  - The Pleasant Conceites of Old Hobson
  - Tom a Lincoln (completed)
- Antoine Loysel – Institutes coutumières
- César Oudin – Thrésor des deux langues françoise et espagnole
- Robert Parker - A scholasticall Discourse against symbolising with Antichrist in ceremonies, especially in the Signe of the Crosse
- Lawrence Twine (translator) – The Pattern of Painful Adventures, second edition (a source for Shakespeare's Pericles, Prince of Tyre)
- Honoré d'Urfé – L'Astrée (part 1)

=== Drama ===
- William Alexander, 1st Earl of Stirling – The Monarchic Tragedies, second edition (adding The Alexandrean and Julius Caesar to closet dramas Croesus and Darius)
- Anonymous – Claudius Tiberius Nero
- Barnabe Barnes – The Devil's Charter
- Francis Beaumont – The Knight of the Burning Pestle
- Beaumont and Fletcher – The Woman Hater (published, earliest of their collaborations to appear in print)
- Thomas Campion – Lord Hay's Masque
- George Chapman – Bussy D'Ambois (published)
- John Day, William Rowley, and George Wilkins – The Travels of the Three English Brothers
- Thomas Dekker – The Whore of Babylon
- Thomas Dekker and John Webster – Westward Ho and Northward Ho published
- Dekker & Webster, with Henry Chettle (?), Thomas Heywood (?) and Wentworth Smith (?) – Sir Thomas Wyatt (published)
- Thomas Heywood – The Fair Maid of the Exchange (published)
- Ben Jonson – Volpone (published)
- John Marston – What You Will (published)
- Thomas Middleton
  - Michaelmas Term (performed)
  - The Phoenix (published)
  - The Puritan (published as "written by W.S.")
  - The Revenger's Tragedy (published)
- Edward Sharpham – Cupid's Whirligig
- Thomas Tomkis – Lingua (published)
- George Wilkins – The Miseries of Enforced Marriage (published)

=== Poetry ===
- Thomas Dekker – The Seven Deadly Sins of London

== Births ==
- March 8 – Johann von Rist, German poet (died 1667)
- July 10 – Philippe Labbe, French Jesuit writer (died 1667)
- October 4 – Francisco de Rojas Zorrilla, Spanish dramatist (died c. 1660)
- November 1 – Georg Philipp Harsdorffer, German poet and translator (died 1658)
- November 5 – Anna Maria van Schurman, Dutch poet (died 1678)
- November 15 – Madeleine de Scudéry, French writer (died 1701)
- Unknown dates
  - Alaol, Bengali poet (died 1673)
  - Antoine Gombaud, French essayist (died 1684)
  - Filadelfo Mugnos, Italian historian (died 1675)
  - Francisco Núñez de Pineda y Bascuñán, Chilean writer and soldier (died 1682)

== Deaths ==
- January 6 – Guidobaldo del Monte, Italian philosopher (born 1545)
- May – Sir Edward Dyer, English poet (born 1543)
- June – Thomas Newton, English physician, clergyman, poet, author and translator (born c. 1542)
- June 19 – Johannes Bertelius, historian of Luxembourg (born 1544)
- June 30 – Caesar Baronius, Italian ecclesiastical historian (born 1538)
- July 6 – Achille Gagliardi, Italian theologian (born 1537)
- July 7 – Penelope Rich, Lady Rich, English noblewoman, inspiration for Sir Philip Sidney's "Stella" (born 1563)
- c. September – Cuthbert Burby, English publisher and bookseller
- October 31 – Wawrzyniec Grzymała Goślicki, Polish philosopher (born c. 1540)
- Unknown date – Dinko Ranjina, Croatian poet (born 1536)
