= 1594 in literature =

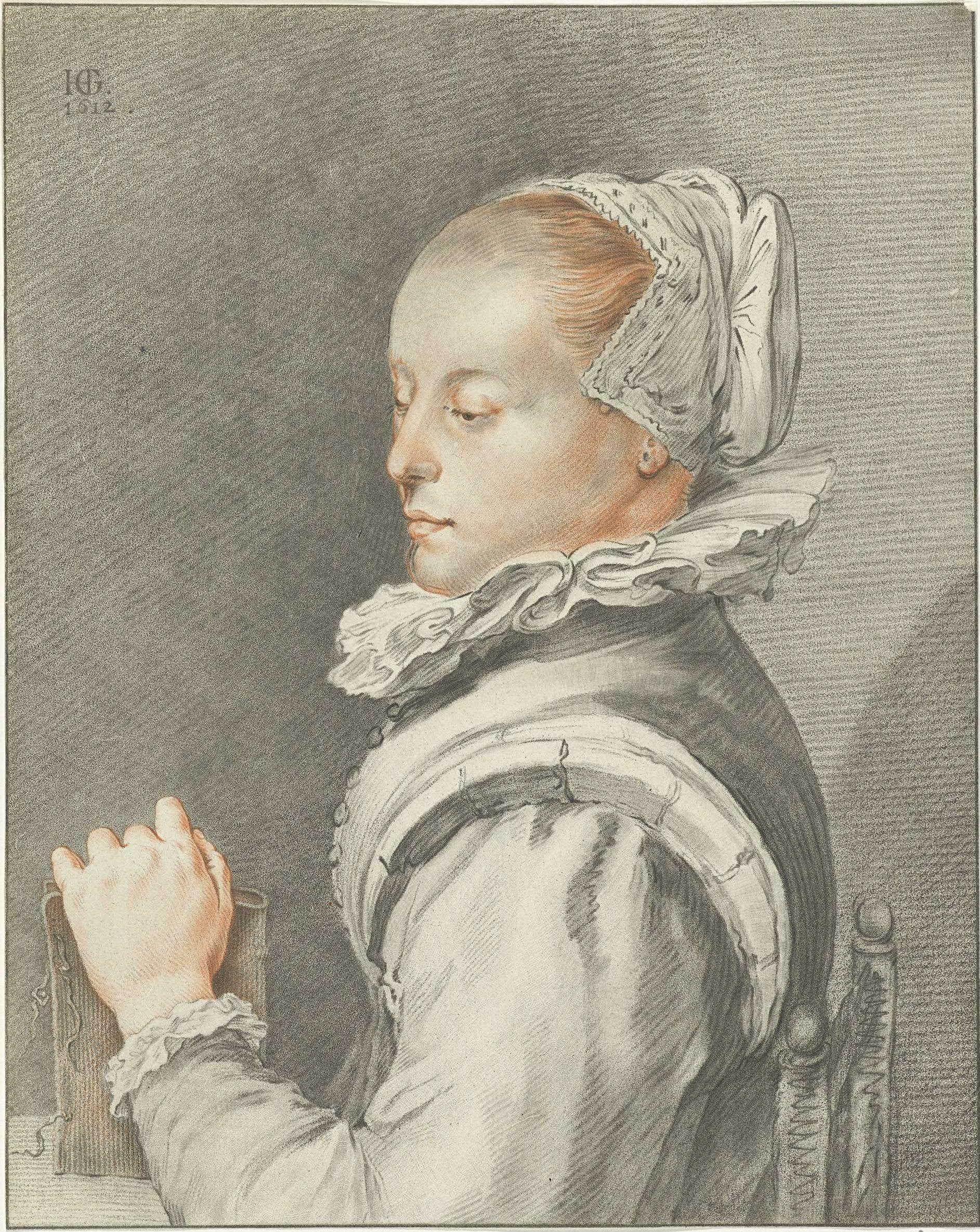
Portrait of Maria Tesselschade Visscher, daughter of Roemer Visscher, copy after Hendrick Goltzius in 1612

This article contains information about the literary events and publications of 1594.

== Events ==
- c. February – The Shakespeare play Titus Andronicus is the first to be published, anonymously in London. His poem The Rape of Lucrece is published after May.
- Spring – The London theaters reopen after two years of general inactivity due to the bubonic plague epidemic of 1592–94. Many actors who used to be Lord Strange's Men form a new company, the Lord Chamberlain's Men, under the patronage of Henry Carey, 1st Baron Hunsdon, Lord Chamberlain of England at the time.
- April 6 and April 9 – Members of Queen Elizabeth's Men and Sussex's Men perform the early King Leir at the Rose Theatre in London.
- May 14 – The reorganized Admiral's Men begin performances with Christopher Marlowe's The Jew of Malta.
- October – The first firmly recorded performance of Marlowe's The Tragicall History of the Life and Death of Doctor Faustus is given by the Admiral's Men with Edward Alleyn in the title role.
- Christmas – Students of Gray's Inn in London perform The Maske of Proteus and the Adamantine Rock before Queen Elizabeth. Written by Francis Davison with music by Thomas Campion, it is probably the first staged masque in England.
- December 28 – Shakespeare's The Comedy of Errors is performed at Gray's Inn.
- unknown date – Franciscus Gomarus becomes professor of theology at Leiden University.

== New books ==
=== Prose ===
- Sir John Davys – The Seamans Secrets
- Richard Hooker – Of the Lawes of Ecclesiastical Politie
- Thomas Nashe – The Unfortunate Traveller

=== Drama ===
- Anonymous
  - The Famous Victories of Henry V (first recorded)
  - A Knack to Know an Honest Man
  - Selimus published
  - The Taming of a Shrew (published)
  - The True Tragedy of Richard III (published)
- Samuel Daniel – Cleopatra
- Lope de Vega – El maestro de danzar (The Dancing Master)
- Robert Greene (published)
  - Friar Bacon and Friar Bungay
  - Orlando Furioso
- Thomas Lodge and Robert Greene – A Looking Glass for London (published)
- Thomas Lodge – The Wounds of Civil War (published)
- John Lyly – Mother Bombie (published)
- Christopher Marlowe (k. 1593)
  - Edward II (earliest known edition)
  - The Massacre at Paris (earliest edition, undated, probable year)
  - (with Thomas Nashe?) – Dido, Queen of Carthage (published)
- William Shakespeare:
  - The Comedy of Errors (performed)
  - Titus Andronicus (published)
- Robert Wilson – The Cobbler's Prophecy (published)

=== Poetry ===
- Richard Barnfield – The Affectionate Shepherd
- George Chapman – The Shadow of Night
- William Shakespeare – The Rape of Lucrece
- Thomas Storer – Life and Death of Cardinal Wolsey
- Henry Willobie – Willobie His Avisa

== Births ==
- January 24 – Pierre de Marca, French historian and bishop (died 1662)
- March 25 – Maria Tesselschade Visscher, Dutch poet (died 1649)
- September 30 – Antoine Gérard de Saint-Amant, French poet (died 1661)
- Unknown date – John Spelman, English historian (died 1643)

== Deaths ==
- c. February 7 – Barnabe Googe, English poet (born 1540)
- April 29 – Thomas Cooper, English lexicographer, controversialist and bishop (born c. 1517)
- May 30 – Bálint Balassi, Hungarian lyric poet (born 1554)
- June 3 – John Aylmer, English constitutionalist, translator and bishop (born 1521)
- July – Girolamo Mei, Italian historian (born 1519)
- c. July 16 – Thomas Kyd, English dramatist (born 1558)
- November 29 – Alonso de Ercilla, Spanish noble, soldier and epic poet (born 1533)
