= Eugenio Gerardo Lobo =

Spanish poet and soldier

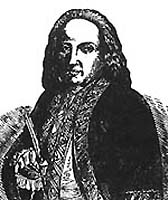
Eugenio Gerardo Lobo

Eugenio Gerardo Lobo Huerta (24 September 1679 in Cuerva, Toledo – 1750 in Barcelona) was a Spanish soldier and poet. He was the Military Governor of Barcelona from 1746 until his death.
