= 1621 in literature =

Events from the year 1621 in literature.

== Events ==
- January 27 – Sir Francis Bacon is created Viscount St Alban. (Note: Some sources such as the Dictionary of National Biography (1885) and the Encyclopædia Britannica, 11th edition spell the title "St. Albans"; others, such as the 2007 Oxford Dictionary of National Biography and the Encyclopædia Britannica, 9th edition, spell it "St. Alban".)
- February 3 – John Chamberlain writes to Sir Dudley Carleton telling him the anonymous author of the tract Vox Populi has been revealed to be the radical preacher Thomas Scott.
- May 3 – Sir Francis Bacon is imprisoned in the Tower of London after being convicted of receiving bribes, but pardoned by King James I later in the year.
- August 26 – Barten Holyday's allegorical play Technogamia, originally produced at Christ Church, Oxford in 1618, is staged before James I at Woodstock Palace. He dislikes it, but is persuaded to stay to the end for the student actors' sakes.
- September 24 – The earliest known copy of the Corante, generally regarded as the first English newspaper, is published.
- November 22 – The English poet John Donne is installed as Dean of St Paul's Cathedral in London.
- December 30 – The Spanish writer Francisco de Borja y Aragón is replaced as Viceroy of Peru by Juan Jiménez de Montalvo, and embarks for home on the following day.

Uncertain date

- Jeremias Drexel gives up preaching in order to write a biography of Elisabeth of Lorraine.

== New books ==
=== Prose ===
- William Alabaster – De bestia Apocalypsis
- Robert Burton – The Anatomy of Melancholy
- Méric Casaubon – Pietas contra maledicos patrii Nominis et Religionis Hostes
- Mao Yuanyi (茅元儀, editor) – Wubei Zhi (武備志, Treatise on Armaments)
- John Reynolds – The triumphs of Gods revenge, against the crying, and execrable sinne of murther
- Rachel Speght – Mortalities Memorandum
- John Taylor – Taylor's Motto
- Tobias Venner – A briefe and accurate treatise concerning the taking of the fume of tobacco
- John Widdowes – A Description of the World
- Lady Mary Wroth – The Countess of Montgomery's Urania

=== Drama ===
- Francis Beaumont, John Fletcher, & Philip Massinger – Thierry and Theodoret (published)
- Thomas Dekker, John Ford, & William Rowley – The Witch of Edmonton
- Ben Jonson – The Gypsies Metamorphosed
- Tirso de Molina – El vergonzoso en palacio

=== Poetry ===
- George Wither – Wither's Motto

== Births ==
- January 27 – Thomas Willis, English physician and natural philosopher (died 1675)
- March 18 – Henry Teonge, English diarist and naval chaplain (died 1690)
- March 31 – Andrew Marvell, English poet (died 1678)
- April 25 – Roger Boyle, 1st Earl of Orrery, Anglo-Irish dramatist (died 1679)
- July 8 – Jean de La Fontaine, French author of fables (died 1695)
- December 3 – Bohuslav Balbín, Czech Jesuit writer (died 1688)
- December 14 (baptised) – Thomas Long, English writer and cleric (died 1707)
- unknown date – Jane Cavendish, English poet and playwright (died 1669)
- probable – Françoise Bertaut de Motteville, French memoirist (died 1689)
- Possible year (1621 or 1622) – Richard Allestree, English scholar and cleric (died 1681)

== Deaths ==
- January 25 – François Pithou, French author and jurist (born 1543)
- March 4 – Ana de Jesús, Spanish nun and writer (born 1545)
- May 11 – Johann Arndt, German theologian (born 1555)
- June – William Strachey, English eye-witness historian (born 1572)
- August 3 – Guillaume du Vair, French writer (born 1556)
- August 15 – John Barclay, Scottish writer (born 1582)
- September 25 – Mary Sidney, English playwright and translator (born 1561)
- October 7 or 8 – Antoine de Montchrestien, French adventurer and dramatist (born c. 1575)
- December 4 – Andrew Willet, English polemicist and cleric (born 1562)
- unknown date – Ludwig Hollonius, German dramatist (born c. 1570)
