= Gabriel Alonso de Herrera =

Spanish author (1470-1539)

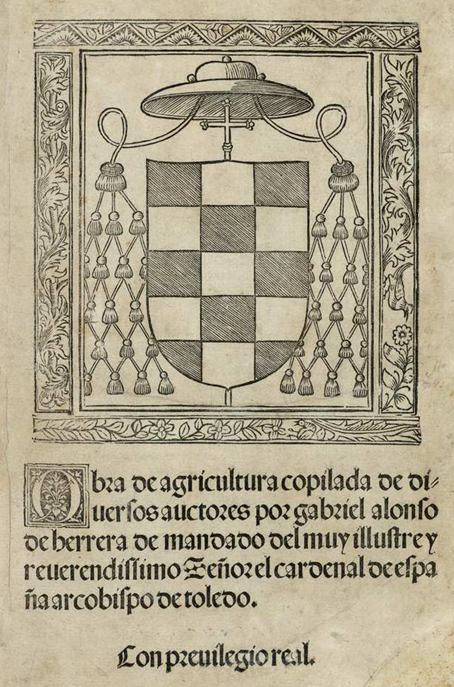
Frontispiece of the "Obra de Agricultura copilada de diuersos auctores". Alcalá de Henares: Arnao Guillén de Brocar; 1513.

Gabriel Alonso de Herrera (1470–1539) was a Spanish author, best known for his Obra de Agricultura (Treatise on Agriculture), published in 1513 under the patronage of Cardinal Cisneros.

Herrera was born in Talavera de la Reina. His treatise contains the teachings of the classics, and was used as a reference book until the early 20th century. This ample tome also contains information on veterinary medicine, meteorology and studies on the influence of food on health.
