= Benedetto Justiniani =

Italian theologian (1550–1622)

Benedetto Justiniani (1550 – 19 December 1622) was a Jesuit theologian and Biblical scholar from Genoa, in what is today Italy.

Justiniani entered the Jesuit noviciate at Rome in 1579 and later taught rhetoric in the Roman College, and then theology at Toulouse, Messina, and Rome. For more than twenty years, he served as head of the Roman College and regens of the Sacra Poenitentiaria (Apostolic Penitentiary). He also filled the post of Chief Preacher to the Pope. Pope Clement VIII appointed him theologian to Cardinal Thomas Cajetan, during his legation in Poland. Justiniani died at Rome in 1622.

== Works ==
Justiniani's writings include:

- In omnes B. Pauli Epistolas explanationes, 2 vols.
- In omnes Catholicas Epistolas explanationes
- Apologia pro libertate ecclesiastica ad Gallo-Francos
