= Thomas Arthur (dramatist) =

English divine and dramatist

Thomas Arthur (died 1532) was an English divine and dramatist.

A native of Norfolk, he was educated at Cambridge University, probably in Trinity Hall, and imbibed Protestant opinions from his fellow-countryman, Thomas Bilney. Arthur was admitted a fellow of St John's College in February 1517–18, being then a master of arts, and in 1518 he occurs as principal of St Mary's Hostel. In 1526 he and Bilney were charged with heresy, and compelled to take an oath abjuring Luther's opinions. In November 1527 they were brought as relapsed heretics before Cardinal Wolsey and other bishops in the chapter house at Westminster Abbey. Both of them recanted and did penance, though Bilney afterwards had the courage of his opinions and suffered for them at the stake. Arthur died at Walsingham in 1532.

== Publications ==
- Microcosmus, a tragedy
- Mundus plumbeus, a tragedy
- In quosdam Psalmos
- Homeliæ Christianæ
- A translation of Erasmus, De Milite Christiano
