= Lorenzo de Sepúlveda =

Lorenzo de Sepúlveda (c. 1505 – c. 1580) was a Spanish writer best known as the author of romances in verse.

== Life and Works ==
Little is known of Lorenzo de Sepúlveda's life. He descended from a notable family and lived most or all of his life in Seville.

In 1551 a volume of narrative poems that he had written, Romances nueuamente sacados de historias antiguas de la crónica de España [Romances newly drawn from antique stories of the chronicle of Spain], was published with considerable success.

Another work usually attributed to this author is a comedy in prose in the style of the Italian commedia dell'arte, first performed circa 1565; it is known as the Comedia de Sepúlveda. Although the style of the play is very different from that of the romances, and although there are few clues to the identity of the author, Lorenzo de Sepúlveda remains the best candidate.

== The Romances ==
Romances in the Spanish language had been a form of popular narrative poetry since the Middle Ages. They were almost entirely orally transmitted, changing as they passed on, and had as their themes the deeds of legendary heroes, the kings and knights of history. In the early 16th century, several compilations of these works were written down and published. Prompted by a new attitude toward history among lettered people, the subgenre known as "erudite romances" arose, composed as literary works. The Romances of Sepúlveda is sometimes credited with originating it; however, the similar, though less successful, work of Alonso de Fuentes had been published a year earlier.

In the introduction to the 1551 first edition of Romances nueuamente sacados de historias antiguas de la crónica de España, Sepúlveda makes clear his intention: to introduce a true history of Spain, based on official chronicles, to a popular audience by using the form of the romance. He hoped that his verses would supplant the traditional legends which, he declared, were "exceedingly mendacious, and of very little value". His source was the Crónica general, a compilation of medieval chronicles initially commissioned by Alfonso X (Alfonso the Wise) in 1264; Florián de Ocampo had published a new edition in 1541. Ironically, though Sepúlveda was unaware of it, many of the most dramatic episodes in the chronicles were themselves prose adaptations of popular romances. The Romances contains multiple narratives about Alfonso X, El Cid, and other historical figures, as well as a few love stories, biblical tales, and allegories. Some of the themes that influenced Sepúlveda in his choice of material were the relationship between king and vassals, and the interactions between Christians and Moors, generally portrayed in a positive light because of an increase in interest in Moorish culture and literature in the 16th century.

The Romances gained wide popularity. The work was reprinted several times, and selections from it featured in many subsequent collections of romances. Several of them became the canonical version of their legend, a status they retained as late as the 19th century, although they are no longer much read today. The French poet Théophile Gautier imitated one of Sepúlveda's romances in his poem "Le Cid et le juif" (1843).

== References and further reading ==
- Asenjo, Julio Alonso (1991). La Comedia erudita de Sepúlveda: Estudio y texto paleogrico-crítico. London: Tamesis Books Limited. ISBN 0-7293-0311-X.
- Durán, Agustin (1849–1851). Romancero general, o Colección de romances castellanos anteriores al siglo XVIII. Madrid: Rivadeneyra. Google Books: Volume I, Volume II.
- Gómez Redondo, Fernando (2000). El romancero alfonsí. In Beltran, Rafaél, Historia, reescritura y pervivencia del romancero: Estudias en memoria de Amelia García-Valdecasas, pp. 105–125. Valencia: Publicacions de la Universitat de València. ISBN 84-370-4436-7.
- Menéndez y Pelayo, Marcelino (1894). Antología de poetas líricas castellanos, Tomo 12. Madrid: Hernando.
- Sepúlveda, Lorenzo de; Cotarelo y Mori, Emilio (1901). Comedia de Sepúlveda. Madrid: Imprenta de la Revista española. Google Books
- Vásquez Estévez, Ana (2003). La Comedia de Sepúlveda: Notas acerca de su rescate y adquisicion por la Biblioteca del Instituto del Teatro. Revista Galega de Teatro, no. 35, pp. 39–41. Biblioteca Virtual Miguel de Cervantes
- Wolf, Ferdinand (1859). Studien zur Geschichte der spanischen und portugiesischen Nationalliteratur. Berlin: A. Asher. Google Books
