= 1561 in literature =

List of years in literature	(table)
- … 1551; 1552; 1553; 1554; 1555; 1556; 1557; 1558; 1559; 1560; 1561; 1562; 1563; 1564; 1565; 1566; 1567; 1568; 1569; 1570; 1571 …
- Art; Archaeology; Architecture; Literature; Music; Philosophy; Science; +...

This article contains information about the literary events and publications of 1561.

== Events ==
- August 21 – The Peresopnytsia Gospels are completed.
- September – Serbian Orthodox hieromonks Jovan Maleševac and Matija Popović begin to collaborate with the Protestant reformer Primož Trubar on printing the New Testament and other religious books in Cyrillic letters, at Urach in Germany.
- unknown dates
  - William Baldwin's Beware the Cat, written in 1553, is first published anonymously in London. It is an early example of extended fiction (and specifically of horror fiction) in English, but it appears to have been suppressed and no copies survive.
  - The Tian Yi Ge library in Ningbo is established by Fan Qin in Ming dynasty China.

== New books ==
=== Prose ===
- John Calvin – Institution of the Christian Religion (English translation by Thomas Norton)
- Bartolomé de las Casas – History of the Indies (completed; first published 1875)
- Gabriele Fallopius – Observationes anatomicae
- Francesco Guicciardini (posthumously) – Storia d'Italia (History of Italy, first 16 of 20 books)
- Sir Thomas Hoby – The Book of the Courtier (Il Cortegiano, translation)
- Julius Caesar Scaliger – Poetices

=== Drama ===
- Thomas Norton and Thomas Sackville – Gorboduc

=== Poetry ===
- See 1561 in poetry

== Births ==
- January 22 – Sir Francis Bacon, English philosopher, scientist and statesman (died 1626)
- June – Samuel Harsnett, English religious writer and archbishop (died 1631)
- July 11 – Luís de Góngora y Argote, Spanish poet (died 1627)
- August 14 – Sir Christopher Heydon, English writer on astrology (died 1623)
- October 27 – Mary Sidney, English poet and translator (died 1621)
- unknown dates
  - Gaspar Aguilar, Spanish poet and dramatist (died 1623)
  - Bernardo de Balbuena, Spanish-born Latin American poet (died 1627)

== Deaths ==
- February 26 – Jorge de Montemayor, Portuguese novelist and poet (born c. 1520)
- March 19 – Lady Jane Seymour, English writer (born c. 1541)
- March 25 – Conrad Lycosthenes, Alsatian humanist and encyclopedist (born 1518)
- July 5 – Ambrosius Pelargus, German theologian (born c. 1493)
- October 21 – Johannes Vasaeus, Flemish teacher and historian (born 1511)
- October 28 – Jakob Beurlin, German Lutheran theologian (born 1520)
- December 10 – Caspar Schwenckfeld, German theologian and preacher (born c. 1490)
- unknown dates
  - Marie Dentière, Genevan theologian (born 1495)
  - Claude Garamond, French publisher (born 1480)
