= 1584 in literature =

This article contains information about the literary events and publications of 1584.

== Events ==
- Master Thomas Giles takes charge of the Children of Paul's, a company of boy actors. This is the start of a close association with the works of John Lyly.
- London printer John Twyn is hanged, drawn and quartered for producing an edition of Gregory Martin's Catholic A Treatise of Schisme (1578).

== New books ==
=== Prose ===
- Giordano Bruno – La Cena de le Ceneri (Ash Wednesday Supper)
- John Dee – 48 Claves angelicae (48 Angelic Keys, written in Kraków)
- Arthur Faunt - Assertiones Theologicæ de Christi in terris Ecclesia, quaenam et penes quos existat (Theological assertions of Christ's Church on earth, what are they and who may make them)
- James VI of Scotland – Some Reulis and Cautelis to be observit and eschewit in Scottis poesie
- David Powel – The Historie of Cambria, now called Wales (first printed history of Wales)
- Reginald Scot – The Discoverie of Witchcraft
- Richard Stanihurst – De rebus in Hibernia gestis (Of matters in the history of Ireland)
- Lucas Janszoon Waghenaer – Spiegel der Zeevaerdt (Mariners' Mirror, English 1588, Latin 1591)

=== Drama ===
- 'A.M.' (probably Anthony Munday) – Fidele and Fortunio
- Robert Wilson (attributed) – The Three Ladies of London

=== Poetry ===
See 1584 in poetry

- Thomas Watson – Hekatompathia or Passionate Centurie of Love (publication)

== Births ==
- May – André Duchesne, French geographer and historian (died 1640)
- August 29 – Patrick Young, Scottish scholar and royal librarian (died 1652)
- September 15 – Georg Rudolf Weckherlin, German poet (died 1653)
- December 16 – John Selden, English polymath (died 1654)
- unknown dates
  - Francis Beaumont, English dramatist and poet (died 1616)
  - Anna Ovena Hoyer, German/Swedish poet (died 1655)
  - Hu Zhengyan, Chinese artist, printmaker, calligrapher and publisher (died 1674)

== Deaths ==
- February 18 – Antonio Francesco Grazzini, Italian prose writer (born 1503)
- March 10 – Thomas Norton, English lawyer, politician and poet (born 1532)
- June 13 – János Zsámboky, Hungarian humanist, philologist and historian (born 1531)
- July 23 – John Day, English Protestant printer (born c. 1522)
- August 12 – Carolus Sigonius, Italian humanist writer (born c. 1524)
- November 21 – Turrianus, Spanish Jesuit Hellenist and polemicist (born c. 1509)
- unknown dates
  - Stephen Batman, English translator (date of birth unknown)
  - Gerhard Dorn, Flemish philosopher, translator and polymath (born c. 1530)
  - Alonso Gutiérrez, Spanish philosopher (born c. 1507)
