= 1604 in literature =

This article contains information about the literary events and publications of 1604.

== Events ==
- January 1 – The King's Men perform Shakespeare's comedy A Midsummer Night's Dream at the English Court.
- c. April – The King's Men perform Ben Jonson's tragedy Sejanus His Fall (written 1603 and previously presented at Court) at the Globe Theatre, where it is not popular. The title role is probably played by Richard Burbage, and Shakespeare also appears.
- July – Miguel de Cervantes sells the rights of the first part of his satirical novel on the theme of chivalry, Don Quixote (El ingenioso hidalgo don Quijote de la Mancha), to Madrid publisher-bookseller Francisco de Robles. In September license to publish is granted and in December the printing (by Juan de la Cuesta) is finished for publication the following month.
- November 1 ("Hallowmas" Day) – The King's Men perform Shakespeare's tragedy Othello at Whitehall Palace with Burbage in the title role, the first recorded performance.
- November 4 – The King's Men perform Shakespeare's comedy The Merry Wives of Windsor at Whitehall Palace.
- December 26 – The King's Men perform Shakespeare's "problem play" Measure for Measure at Court.
- December 28 – The King's Men perform Shakespeare's The Comedy of Errors at Court.
- December – A report shows that the King's Men are performing a play on the politically sensitive Gowrie Conspiracy. It is suppressed and has not survived, but does not affect the company's general success.
- The first known performance of a Shakespeare play in translation, Romeo and Juliet, is performed at Nördlingen in Bavaria in an anonymous German version, Von Romeo undth Julitha.
- Construction takes place of the Red Bull Theatre at Clerkenwell in London.
- The last performances in England of the Beverley miracle plays are given.
- Isaac Casaubon becomes sub-librarian of the royal library in Paris.
- The Table Alphabeticall, the first known English alphabetical dictionary, compiled by Robert Cawdrey, is published.

== New books ==
=== Prose ===
- Bhattakalanka Deva – Karnataka Sabdanusasana
- Lancelot de Casteau – L'Ouverture de cuisine
- Francisco de Quevedo – El Buscón (approximate date of composition)
- Thomas Dekker
  - News from Gravesend
  - The Meeting of Gallants at an Ordinary
- Elizabeth Grymeston – Miscellanea: prayers, meditations, memoratives
- King James I of England – A Counterblaste to Tobacco
- Agnolo Monosini – Floris Italicae lingue libri novem
- Samuel Rowlands – Looke to it; for Ile stabbe ye
- John Stow – Revised edition of Summarie of Englyshe Chronicles
- Simon Studion – Naometria
- Jacques Auguste de Thou – Historia sui temporis (History of His Own Times)

=== Drama ===
- William Alexander, 1st Earl of Stirling – The Monarchic Tragedies; includes Croesus and Darius, two closet dramas
- Samuel Daniel – Philotas; The Vision of the Twelve Goddesses (masque)
- Thomas Dekker and Thomas Middleton – The Honest Whore, Part 1
- Thomas Dekker and John Webster – Westward Ho
- Ben Jonson and Thomas Dekker – The Coronation Triumph
- Christopher Marlowe (k. 1593) – Doctor Faustus (first quarto, the "A text"; original text probably written around 1589)
- John Marston – The Malcontent (published)
- Thomas Middleton – Michaelmas Term
- William Shakespeare – Hamlet published (second quarto, "Q2", a "good" quarto as opposed to the 1603 "bad quarto", "Q1")

=== Poetry ===
- Bernardo de Balbuena – La Grandeza Mexicana ("Mexico's Grandeur")
- Nicholas Breton (as Bonerto) – The Passionate Shepheard, or The shepheardes love... With many excellent conceited poems and pleasant sonnets, fit for young heads to passe away
- Guru Arjan – Guru Granth Sahib
- Anthony Scoloker – Daiphantus, or the Passions of Love

== Births ==
- February 24 – Arcangela Tarabotti, born Elena Tarabotti, Venetian nun and feminist writer (died 1652)
- May 10 – Jean Mairet, French dramatist (died 1686)
- May 29 (bapt.) – Isaac Ambrose, English religious writer and diarist (died c. 1663)
- October 16 – Charles Coypeau d'Assoucy, French burlesque poet (died 1677)
- November 23 (bapt.) – Jasper Mayne, English translator and dramatist (died 1672)
- Unknown dates
  - Charles Cotin, French philosopher and poet (died 1681)
  - Nicholas French, Irish Catholic pamphleteer and bishop (died 1678)
  - Girolamo Graziani, Italian poet (died 1675)

== Deaths ==
- February 25 – Manuel da Costa, Portuguese historian (born 1541)
- March 4 – Fausto Paolo Sozzini, Italian theologian (born 1539)
- March 13 – Arnaud d'Ossat, French diplomat, cardinal and writer (born 1537)
- April 1 – Thomas Churchyard, English poet (born c. 1520)
- June 10 – Isabella Andreini, Paduan-born actress and writer (born 1564)
- June 24 – Edward de Vere, 17th Earl of Oxford English poet, playwright and courtier (born 1550)
- August 3 – Bernardino de Mendoza, Spanish military commander and historian (born c. 1540)
- September 10 – William Morgan, Welsh Bible translator (born 1545)
- October 8 – Janus Dousa, Dutch historian and poet (born 1545)
- November – Thomas Storer, English poet (born c. 1571)
- December 22 – Juan Jose Marti, Spanish novelist (born c. 1570)
- unknown date – Thomas North, English translator (born 1535)
