= Manuel da Costa (bibliographer) =

Portuguese Jesuit priest and bibliographer (1541–1604)

Manuel da Costa (1541 – 25 February 1604) was a Portuguese Jesuit and bibliographer from Lisbon.

After teaching humanities and theology at several schools, like Coimbra where most of the Jesuit letters were available in uncensored form, he was chosen rector of Braga, then missionary to the Azores; he was distinguished by his zeal. He wrote A História das Missões dos Jesuítas no Oriente, Até ao Ano de 1568 (History of the Jesuit Missionaries to the East, until 1568). The manuscript was sent to Rome, translated into Latin, and was then given to the young novice Giovanni Pietro Maffei (1533-1603) to prepare it for publication. Maffei added a considerable amount of text to Acosta's work, entitled De Japonicis rebus epistolarum. This part contains abridged Latin translations of letters sent from the Jesuits working in Japan until the year 1564. In his introduction, Maffei congratulates Da Costa on his effort in summarizing the contents of the letters together in a short commentary. The P. de Lequerica translated the same work into Spanish.
