= Gabriel Bocángel =

Gabriel Bocángel y Unzueta (1603–1658) was a playwright and poet of the Spanish Golden Age. Born in Madrid, he studied at Alcalá de Henares and then served as librarian to Cardinal-Infante Ferdinand. He also served as bookkeeper and chronicler to the king. He participated in various literary contests and competitions. Philip IV of Spain granted him a life pension.

He was the first playwright to introduce music into theatrical performances, thus creating a distant precursor to the zarzuela.

His poems can be divided into two main groups: Liras Humanas and Liras Sagradas.
