= Fernán Pérez de Oliva =

16th-century Spanish writer

Fernan Perez de Oliva
- Born: 1492; Córdoba, Spain
- Died: 1533 (aged 40–41); Córdoba, Spain

Fernán Pérez de Oliva (c. 1492 – 1530 or 1533) was a Spanish man of letters.

He was born in Córdoba. After studying at Salamanca, Alcalá, Paris and Rome, he was appointed rector at Salamanca, where he died in 1530 or 1531. His Dialogo de la dignidad del hombre (1543), an unfinished work completed by Francisco Cervantes de Salazar, was written chiefly to prove the suitability of Spanish as a vehicle for philosophic discussion. He also published translations of the Amphitryon (1525), the Electra (1528) and the Hecuba (1528).
