= Robert Carliell =

English didactic poet died c. 1622

Robert Carliell or Carleill (died c. 1622) was an English didactic poet. A Londoner and a leather seller, he is remembered mainly for a defence in verse of the newly established Church of England.

== Polemic ==
Carliell is remembered mainly for his verse defence of the new Church of England and diatribe against the Roman Catholic Church: "Britaine's glorie, or An allegoricall dreame with the exposition thereof: containing The Heathens infidelitie in religion. The Turkes blasphemie in religion. The Popes hypocrisie in religion. Amsterdams varietie in religion. The Church of Englands veritie in religion. Conceiued and written by Robert Carliell Gent." It was dedicated "to all vertuous Nobilitie and well affected Gentrie", to whom he wished "Grace, Mercy, and Peace in Jesus Christ".

This didactic poem of 42 six-line stanzas was first published in 1619 by G. Eld and M. Flesher of London. It was accompanied by a prose exposition, which likens Roman Catholics and Protestant schismatics to tobacco, for "so doth their profession and their faith in their Religion make their soules black, and cause filthy blasphemies to come out of their mouthes."

== Identity ==
The poet is thought to have been the same as Robert Carleill, who was a citizen of London and a leather seller, and who left a legacy to an estranged son Robert, in a will dated 9 October 1622. His wife's name was Frances and he had owned property in Bell Alley, off Coleman Street, in the parish of St Botolph-without-Bishopsgate.
