= Die Lügend von S. Johanne Chrysostomo =

1537 book by Martin Luther

Die Lügend von S. Johanne Chrysostomo, first published by Martin Luther in 1537, is an edition of the late mediaeval Life of John Chrysostom as a hermit, characterised by Luther's sceptical, and often sarcastic, marginal commentary. It was influential on the decline of the literary form of the Christian legendary.

== Content ==
Luther dedicated his edition ironically to the Roman Catholic clerics at the Council of Mantua, including the Pope.

The title of the edition is a pun on early modern German Legend ('hagiography'), and the German word lügend which means 'lying' (in the sense of saying things which are not true). This kind of pun is characteristic of Reformation-period satire and polemic. Luther provided his edition with a critical, and even sarcastic, marginal commentary which was intended to expose the implausibility of events recounted in the legend. Luther's preface accused 'the Roman church not only of having propagated these lies but also of rewarding with indulgences the faithful who read them'.

== Bibliographic history and sources ==
Luther published his edition in 1537 in Wittenberg, Augsburg, and Strassburg; the full title was Die Lügend von S. Johanne Chrysostomo, an die Heiligen Veter jnn dem vermeinten Concilio zu Mantua, durch D. Marti. Luther gesand. His source text was one of the many editions of the German collection of saints' lives Der Heiligen Leben, presumably a redaction similar to the 1513 imprint from Augsburg by Johann Otmar.

== Modern editions ==
The Lügend is number 50 in the Weimar edition of Martin Luther's works.
