= Lazare de Baïf =

French diplomat and humanist (1496–1547)

Lazare de Baïf (1496–1547) was a French diplomat and humanist. His natural son, Jean-Antoine de Baïf, was born in Venice, while Lazare was French ambassador there.

He published a translation of the Electra of Sophocles in 1537, and afterwards a version of the Hecuba. He was an elegant writer of Latin verse, and is commended by Joachim du Bellay as having introduced certain valuable words into the French language.
