= Antoine Girard de Saint-Amant =

French poet (1594–1661)

Antoine Girard, sieur de Saint-Amant (September 30, 1594 – December 29, 1661) was a French poet.

Saint-Amant was born near Rouen in the Province of Normandy. His father was a merchant who had, according to his son's account, been a sailor and had commanded for 22 years "une escadre de la reine Elizabeth" – a vague statement that lacks confirmation. The son obtained a patent of nobility, and attached himself to different great noblemen – the duc de Retz and the comte d'Harcourt among others. He saw military service and sojourned at different times in Italy, in England – a sojourn which provoked from him a violent poetical attack on the country, Albion (1643) – in Poland, where he held a court appointment for two years, and elsewhere. Saint-Amant's later years were spent in France; And he died at Paris.

Saint-Amant has left a considerable body of poetry. His Albion and Rome ridicule set the fashion of the burlesque poem. In his later years he devoted himself to serious subjects and produced an epic, Moyse sauvé (1653). His other work consists of Bacchanalia songs, his Débauche being one of the most remarkable convivial poems of its kind.
