= 1623 in literature =

This article contains information about the literary events and publications of 1623.

== Events ==
- February 2 (Candlemas) – The King's Men perform Twelfth Night (under the alternative title Malvolio) at the court of King James I of England.
- February 28 – John Hacket's Latin comedy Loiola is staged at Trinity College, Cambridge, and repeated on March 12 for King James I of England on his third visit to the university. The play mocks both Catholics, in the person of Ignatius Loyola, and Calvinists, who are represented by Martinus, a canting elder of Amsterdam.
- June 29 – Pedro Calderón de la Barca makes his debut as a playwright, his Amor, honor y poder (Love, Honor and Power) being performed at the Spanish Court. Two other plays follow this year.
- July 20 – Henry Herbert (Sir Henry from August) becomes deputy to Sir John Ashley, Master of the Revels and takes over his duties. Herbert effectively controls professional drama in England from 1623 until the theaters close in 1642.
- Between November 8 and December 5 – Publication of the "First Folio" (Mr. William Shakespeares Comedies, Histories, & Tragedies), a collection of 36 of the plays of Shakespeare, half of which have not previously been printed, compiled posthumously by actors John Heminges and Henry Condell and published by Isaac Jaggard and Edward Blount in London. The first recorded purchase is on December 5, of two copies at £1 each by Sir Edward Dering.
- Procopius's long-lost Secret History is rediscovered in the Vatican Library.
- François le Métel de Boisrobert comes under the patronage of Cardinal Richelieu.

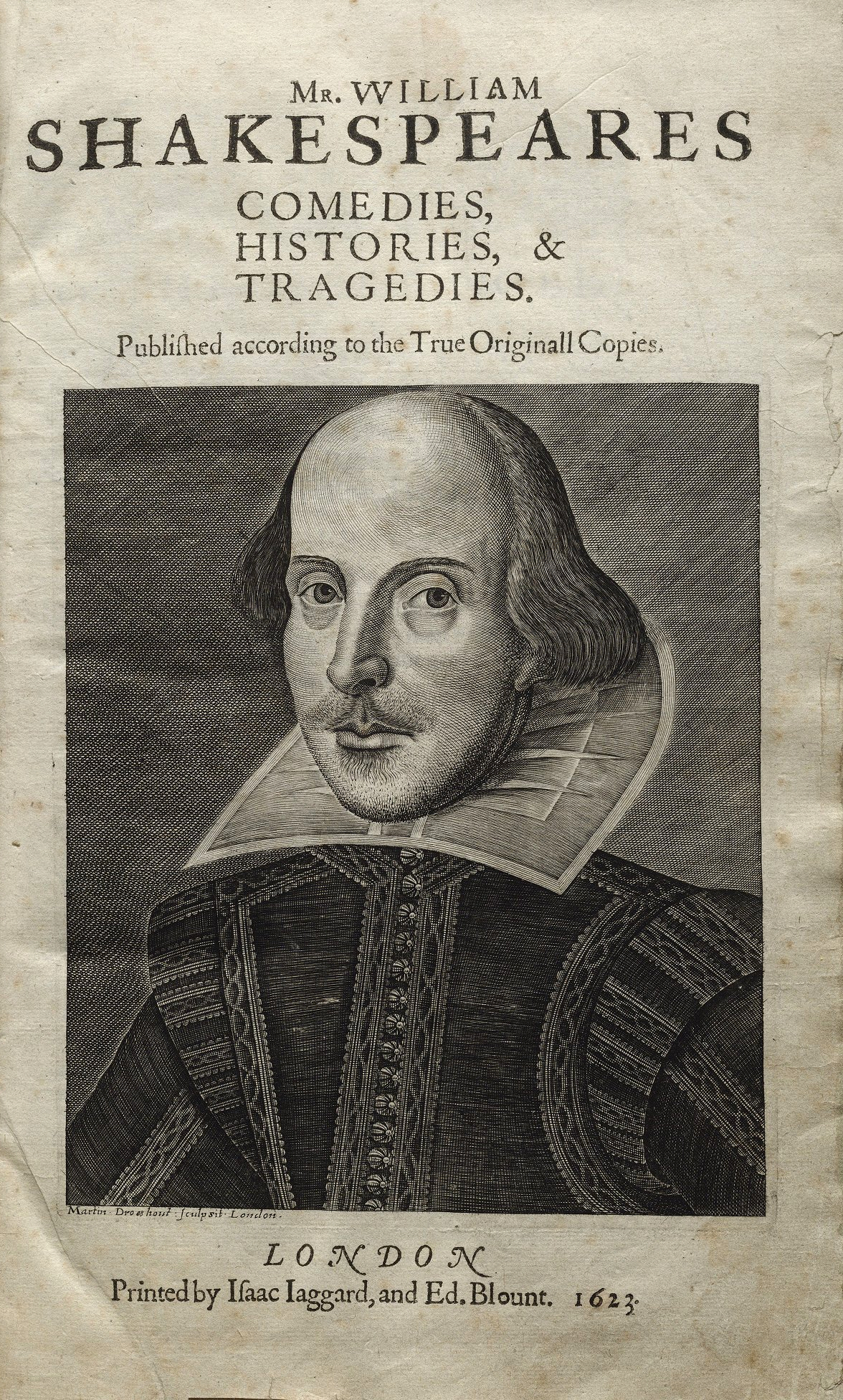
The First Folio

== New books ==
- Francis Bacon – De Augmentis Scientiarum
- Jakob Böhme
  - On Election to Grace
  - On Christ's Testaments
  - Mysterium Magnum
  - Clavis (Key)
- Tommaso Campanella – Civitas Solis ("The City of the Sun")
- Henry Cockeram - English Dictionarie
- William Drummond of Hawthornden – Flowers of Sion
- Galileo Galilei – Il saggiatore (The Assayer)
- James Mabbe – Guzmán de Alfarache, translated from the Spanish original by Mateo Alemán
- Giambattista Marini – Adone
- Antonio de León Pinelo – Discurso de la importancia, de la forma, y de la disposicion de la colleccion de las leyes de Indias
- Thomas Scott – Vox Dei
- George Wither – Hymnes and Songs of the Church

== New drama ==
- Anonymous (Robert Ward?) – Fucus Histriomastix
- Richard Brome – A Fault in Friendship (lost), his earliest known play
- Pedro Calderón de la Barca
  - Amor, honor y poder
  - La selva confusa
  - Los Macabeos
- Thomas Dekker (& John Day?) – The Wonder of a Kingdom
- Thomas Dekker, John Ford, & William Rowley (?) – The Spanish Gypsy
- Thomas Drue – The Duchess of Suffolk
- John Fletcher and Philip Massinger – The Lovers' Progress
- John Fletcher and William Rowley – The Maid in the Mill
- John Hacket – Loiola
- Ben Jonson – Time Vindicated to Himself and to His Honours (masque)
- Philip Massinger
  - The Bondman (performed)
  - The Duke of Milan (published)
- Robert Ward (?) – Fucus Histriomastix
- John Webster
  - The Duchess of Malfi (published)
  - The Devil's Law Case (published)

== Poetry ==
- Martin Opitz – Lob des Feldlebens
- Giovan Battista Marino – L'Adone

== Births ==
- March 27 – Francesco Negri, Italian priest and travel writer (died 1698)
- June 19 – Blaise Pascal, French philosopher (died 1662)
- October 17 – Francis Turretin, Swiss theologian (died 1687)
- Unknown dates
  - Margaret Cavendish, Duchess of Newcastle, English biographer, poet and philosopher (died 1673)
  - Henri Sauval, French historian (died 1676)

== Deaths ==
- January 15 – Paolo Sarpi, Venetian church historian (born 1552)
- July 25 – Gaspar Aguilar, Spanish poet and dramatist (born 1561)
- July/August – Tulsidas, Hindu philosopher and poet (born 1532)
- November – William Jaggard, English printer (born c. 1568)
- November 9 – William Camden, English historian (born 1551)
- November 11 – Philippe de Mornay, French Protestant writer (born 1549)
- December 31 – Philipp Clüver, German historian (born 1580)
