= 1627 in literature =

This article contains information about the literary events and publications of 1627.

== Events ==
- January 1 – Menasseh Ben Israel, founder of the first Hebrew printing press in Amsterdam, produces its first publication, a Spanish rite prayer book.

== New books ==
=== Prose ===
- Francis Bacon (died 1626) – Sylva Sylvarum, or A Natural History and New Atlantis
- Richard Bernard - A Guide to Grand-Jury Men
- Jean-Pierre Camus – Hyacinthe
- George Hakewill – An Apologie or Declaration of the Power and Providence of God
- Marin Mersenne – Traité de l'harmonie universelle
- Honoré d'Urfé (died 1625) – L'Astrée (completed)

== New drama ==
- William Davenant – The Cruel Brother
- William Hawkins – Apollo Shroving
- Philip Massinger – The Great Duke of Florence
- Thomas Vincent – Paria (in Latin)

== Poetry ==
- Michael Drayton – miscellaneous poems, including The Battle of Agincourt, First Steps up Parnassus, and Nymphidia
- Phineas Fletcher – Locustae, vel Pietas Jesuitica (in Latin and English)

== Births ==
- August 8 – Joseph Moxon, English printer and lexicographer (died 1691)
- September 27 – Jacques-Bénigne Bossuet, French theologian (died 1704)
- November 29 – John Ray, English naturalist (died 1705)
- Unknown dates
  - John Flavel, English religious writer and Presbyterian minister (died 1691)
  - Dorothy Osborne, English literary correspondent (died 1695)

== Deaths ==
- April 12 (burial) – John Minsheu, English linguist and lexicographer (born 1560)
- April 19 – John Beaumont, English dramatist and poet (born 1583)
- May 24 – Luis de Góngora, Spanish lyric poet (born 1561)
- June 22 – Lawrence Beyerlinck, Flemish theologian and encyclopedist (born 1578)
- June 27 – John Hayward, English historian (born c.1560)
- July 4 (burial) – Thomas Middleton, English dramatist and poet (born 1580)
- September 20 – Jan Gruter, Flemish critic (born 1560)
- September 29 – Johannes Acronius, Dutch theologian (born 1565)
- October – Bernardo de Balbuena, Spanish-born Latin American poet (born 1561)
- December – Henry Condell, English actor, co-compiler of the First Folio (date of birth unknown)
