= Georg Wickram =

German poet and novelist

Georg (or Jörg) Wickram (c.1505 – before 1562) was a German poet and novelist.

== Life ==
Wickram was born at Colmar in Alsace; the exact date of his birth and death are unknown. He founded a Meistersinger school in Colmar in 1549, and has left a number of Meistersingerlieder. He passed the latter part of his life until his death as the town clerk of Burkheim on the Rhine.

Wickram was a many-sided writer. He edited Albrecht von Halberstadt's Middle High German version of Ovid's Metamorphoses (1545), and in 1555 he published Das Rollwagenbuchlein, one of the best of the many German collections of tales and anecdotes that appeared in the 16th century. The title of the book implies its object, namely, to supply reading for the traveller in the "Rollwagen" or diligences.

As a dramatist, Wickram wrote Fastnachtsspiele (Das Narrengiessen, 1537; Der treue Eckart, 1538) and two dramas on biblical subjects, Der verlorene Sohn (1540) and Tobias (1551). A moralizing poem, Der irrereitende Pilger (1556), is half-satiric, half-didactic.

It is, however, as a novelist that Wickram has left the deepest mark on his time, his chief romances being Ritter Galmy aus Schottland (1539), Gabriotto und Reinhard (1554), Der Knabenspiegel (1554), Von guten und bösen Nachbarn (1556) and Der Goldfaden (1557). These may be regarded as the earliest attempts in German literature to create that modern type of middle-class fiction which ultimately took the place of the decadent medieval chivalric romance.

Wickram's works have been edited by:

- J Bolte and W Scheel for the Stuttgart Literarischer Verein (vols, 222, 223, 229, 230, 1900–1903)
- Der Ritter Galmy was republished by Friedrich de la Motte Fouqué in 1806
- Der Goldfaden by Klemens Brentano in 1809
- the Rollwagenbuchlein was edited by Hermann Kurz in 1865, and there is also a reprint of it in Reclam's Universalbibliothek

See A Stober, J Wickram (1866); Wilhelm Scherer, Die Anfange des deutschen Prosaromans (1897).
