= 1617 in literature =

This article contains information about the literary events and publications of 1617.

== Events ==
- March 4 – Shrovetide riot of the London apprentices damages the Cockpit Theatre. Impresario Christopher Beeston rebuilds it, and christens it the Phoenix for its rebirth, perhaps to designs by Inigo Jones.
- The collected works of John Calvin are published posthumously in Geneva.
- Martin Opitz founds the Fruitbearing Society (Fruchtbringende Gesellschaft) at Weimar.
- Alchemist–hermeticist Robert Fludd begins the publication of his life's work, the Utriusque Cosmi...Historia, which in future years proliferates through multiple published Volumes, Tractates, Sections, and Portions, only to remain incomplete at the time of Fludd's death two decades later.
- Two pseudonymous publications in the Joseph Swetnam anti-feminist controversy appear in 1617: Esther Hath Hang'd Haman by "Esther Sowernam", and The Worming of a Mad Dog by "Constantia Munda". Only Rachel Speght publishes her response to Swetnam, A Muzzle for Melastomus, under her own name.

== New books ==
=== Prose ===
- Johann Valentin Andreae
  - Menippus
  - Invitatio Fraternitatis Christi (1617–18)
- Miguel de Cervantes (died 1616) – Los trabajos de Persiles y Sigismunda
- Declaration of Sports (English royal proclamation on sports permitted on Sunday in Lancashire)
- Robert Fludd – Utriusque Cosmi...Historia, Tomus Primus (The History of the Two Worlds, Volume 1)
- Michael Maier
  - Atalanta Fugiens (emblem book, illustrated by Matthias Merian)
  - Silentium post clamores
- Fynes Moryson – An Itinerary: Containing His Ten Years Travel Through the Twelve Dominions of Germany, Bohemia, Switzerland, Netherland, Denmark, Poland, Italy, Turkey, France, England, Scotland and Ireland
- Anthony Munday – Survay [sic.] of London
- Barnabe Rich – The Irish Hubbub, or the English Hue and Cry
- John Salkeld - A Treatise of Paradise
- Joseph Swetnam – The Schoole of the Noble and Worthy Science of Defence
- Zhang Yingyu – The Book of Swindles

=== Drama ===
- Giambattista Andreini – The Penitent Magdalene published in Mantua
- Gerbrand Adriaenszoon Bredero – De Spaanschen Brabander Ierolimo ("The Spanish Brabanter Jerolimo")
- Ben Jonson
  - The Vision of Delight
  - Lovers Made Men
- Thomas Middleton and William Rowley – A Fair Quarrel published
- Théophile de Viau – Les Amours tragiques de Pyrame et Thisbé (Tragic Loves of Pyramus and Thisbe, performed 1621)

== Births ==
- February 8 – Jonas Moore, English mathematician and surveyor (died 1679)
- May 22 – Johannes Andreas Quenstedt, German theologian (died 1688)
- July 13 (baptised) – Ralph Cudworth, English philosopher (died 1688)
- July 31 – Nicolás Antonio, Spanish bibliographer (died 1684)
- December 9 – Richard Lovelace, English poet (died 1657)
- Unknown dates
  - Pierre Petit, French scholar, poet and Latin writer (died 1687)
  - Vavasor Powell, Welsh religious writer (died 1670)

== Deaths ==
- February 4 – Lodewijk Elzevir, Dutch printer (born c. 1540)
- February 16 – Kaspar Ulenberg, German theologian and translator (born 1549)
- May 7
  - David Fabricius, German theologian (born 1564)
  - Jacques Auguste de Thou, French historian (born 1553)
- August 13 – Johann Jakob Grynaeus, Swiss theologian (born 1540)
- September 25 – Francisco Suárez, Spanish philosopher and theologian (born 1548)
- October 12 – Bernardino Baldi, Italian mathematician and writer (born c. 1540)
- November 6 – John Layfield, English theologian
- November 10 – Barnabe Rich, English soldier and story-teller (born c. 1540)
- December – Thomas Coryat, English travel writer (born c. 1577)
- Unknown dates
  - Giovanni Botero, Italian political theorist and poet (born 1544)
  - Henry Perry, Welsh linguistic scholar and cleric (born c. 1560)
