= 1532 in literature =

This article contains information about the literary events and publications of 1532.

== Events ==
- unknown dates
  - William Thynne's edition of The Workes of Geffray Chaucer is published in England, the first time an English-language writer's texts have been collected together as "Works".
  - First edition of François Villon's Œuvres with a commentary by Clément Marot is published in France.
  - First complete edition of Ariosto's Orlando Furioso is published in Italy.
  - Yamazaki Sōkan compiles the Shinseninutsukubashū, a significant anthology of Japanese renku poetry (from which haiku will develop).

== New books ==
=== Prose ===
- Andrea Alciato - De ponderibus et mensuris
- Otto Brunfels – Contrafayt Kräuterbuch (second and final part: 1537)
- Sebald Heyden – De arte canendi (first installment)
- Niccolò Machiavelli (posthumous) – The Prince (Il Principe)
- Thomas More – The Confutation of Tyndale's Answer
- François Rabelais (as Alcofribas Nasier) – Pantagruel (Les horribles et épouvantables faits et prouesses du très renommé Pantagruel Roi des Dipsodes, fils du Grand Géant Gargantua)
- Feliciano de Silva – Don Florisel de Niquea

=== Poetry ===
- Clément Marot – L'Adolescence clémentine

== Births ==
- February 19 – Jean-Antoine de Baïf, French poet and member of La Pléiade (died 1589)
- November 28 – Bartholomäus Ringwaldt, German didactic poet (died c.1599)
- Unknown dates
  - Étienne Jodelle, French poet and playwright associated with La Pléiade (died 1573)
  - Dominicus Lampsonius, Flemish humanist poet and painter (died 1599)
- Probable year
  - Thomas Norton, English politician and poet (died 1584)
  - Tulsidas (तुलसीदास), Indian Hindu Awadhi language poet, sant and philosopher (died 1623)

== Deaths ==
- August 19 – Caritas Pirckheimer, German abbess and chronicler (born 1467)
- unknown date – Thomas Arthur, dramatist (year of birth unknown)
