= 1620 in literature =

This article contains information about the literary events and publications of 1620.

== Events ==
- September 6 – Thomas Middleton is appointed chronologer of the City of London.
- December 16 – The Book of Psalmes: Englished both in Prose and Metre with Annotations by Henry Ainsworth is the only book taken to New England by the Pilgrim Fathers.
- unknown dates
- John Taylor "The Water Poet" publishes The Praise of Hemp-Seed; with The Voyage of Mr. Roger Bird and the Writer hereof, in a Boat of browne-Paper, from London to Quinborough in Kent. As also, a Farewell to the matchlesse deceased Mr. Thomas Coriat in London, including the first mention in print of the deaths of Shakespeare and Francis Beaumont in 1616.
- The first near-complete English-language translation of Boccaccio's The Decameron, anonymous but attributed to John Florio and based on later French and Italian editions, is published by Isaac Jaggard in London.
- The second version of The Ballad of Chevy Chase appears.
- A Short Account of the Destruction of the Indies by Bartolomé de las Casas and Origin and Progress of the Disturbances in the Netherlands by Johannes Gysius are republished in the Netherlands.

== New books ==
=== Prose ===
- Johann Valentin Andreae – De curiositatis pernicie syntagma
- Francis Bacon – Novum Organum
- John Bainbridge's translation of Ptolemy's De Planetarum Hypothesibus
- Jacob Boehme
  - The Threefold Life of Man
  - Forty Questions on the Soul
  - The Incarnation of Jesus Christ
  - The Six Theosophical Points
  - The Six Mystical Points
- Salomon de Caus – Hortus Palatinus
- Miguel de Cervantes translated by Thomas Shelton – Don Quixote (Second Part)
- Nicolaus Hunnius – Examen errorum Photinianorum
- 'Kinde Kit (of Kingstone)' – Westward for Smelts, or, The Water-man's fare of mad-merry western wenches
- Michael Maier – Septima Philosophica
- Feng Menglong
  - Illustrious Words to Instruct the World (喻世明言, Yushi Mingyan, or Stories Old and New)
  - The Three Sui Quash the Demons' Revolt (The Sorcerer's Revolt or Quelling the Demons, expanded version)
- Bishop William Morgan, revised by Bishop Richard Parry and John Davies (Mallwyd) – Y Bibl Cyssegr-lan (Bible translation into Welsh)
- Samuel Rowlands – The Night-raven (i. e. Nachtkrapp, a story to scare children)
- Tobias Venner – Via Recta ad Vitam Longam

=== Drama ===
- Anonymous (perhaps Thomas Heywood) – Swetnam the Woman-Hater published
- Francis Beaumont and John Fletcher – Philaster published
- Thomas Dekker and Philip Massinger – The Virgin Martyr
- Ben Jonson
  - News from the New World Discovered in the Moon (masque)
  - Pan's Anniversary (masque)
- Friedrich Menius (editor) – Englishe Comedien und Tragedien (translated collection)
- Thomas Middleton & William Rowley – The World Tossed at Tennis (masque)
- Approximate date – Lady Mary Wroth – Love's Victory (closet drama)

== Births ==
- January 29 – Lucy Hutchinson, English biographer and translator (died 1681)
- July 20 – Nikolaes Heinsius the Elder, Dutch poet and scholar (died 1681)
- August 21 (bapt.) – Marchamont Nedham, English journalist and pamphleteer (died 1678)
- October 31 – John Evelyn, English diarist (died 1706)
- November 10 – Ninon de l'Enclos, French author and patron of the arts (died 1705)
- unknown dates
  - Alexander Brome, English poet (died 1666)
  - István Gyöngyösi – Hungarian poet (died 1704)
- probable
  - Mary Forster, English Quaker polemicist (died 1687)
  - William Maurice, Welsh antiquary (died 1680)
  - Melchisédech Thévenot, French polymath (died 1692)

== Deaths ==
- February 1 – Mario di Calasio, Italian author of Hebrew concordance (born 1550)
- February 19 – Roemer Visscher, Dutch writer (born 1547)
- March 1 – Thomas Campion, English poet and composer (born 1567)
  - By August – Nathan Field, English dramatist (born 1587)
- November 6 – Richard Carew, English author and translator (born 1555)
- Unknown date – Prudencio de Sandoval, Spanish Benedictine historian (born 1553)
