= 1540 in literature =

This article contains information about the literary events and publications of 1540.

== Events ==
- July 22 – Klemens Janicki is appointed poeta laureatus by Pope Paul III.
- December 13 – John Standish's religious work A lytle treatyse is printed by Elisabeth Pickering, the first work known to be printed in London by a woman.
- unknown dates
  - The first known book from the first printing press in North America, set up in Mexico City, is published, Manual de Adultos.
  - Sir David Lyndsay's Middle Scots satirical morality play A Satire of the Three Estates is given a private first performance.
  - Lazare de Baif travels with Pierre de Ronsard to Alsace, where they meet northern humanists.

== New books ==
=== Prose ===
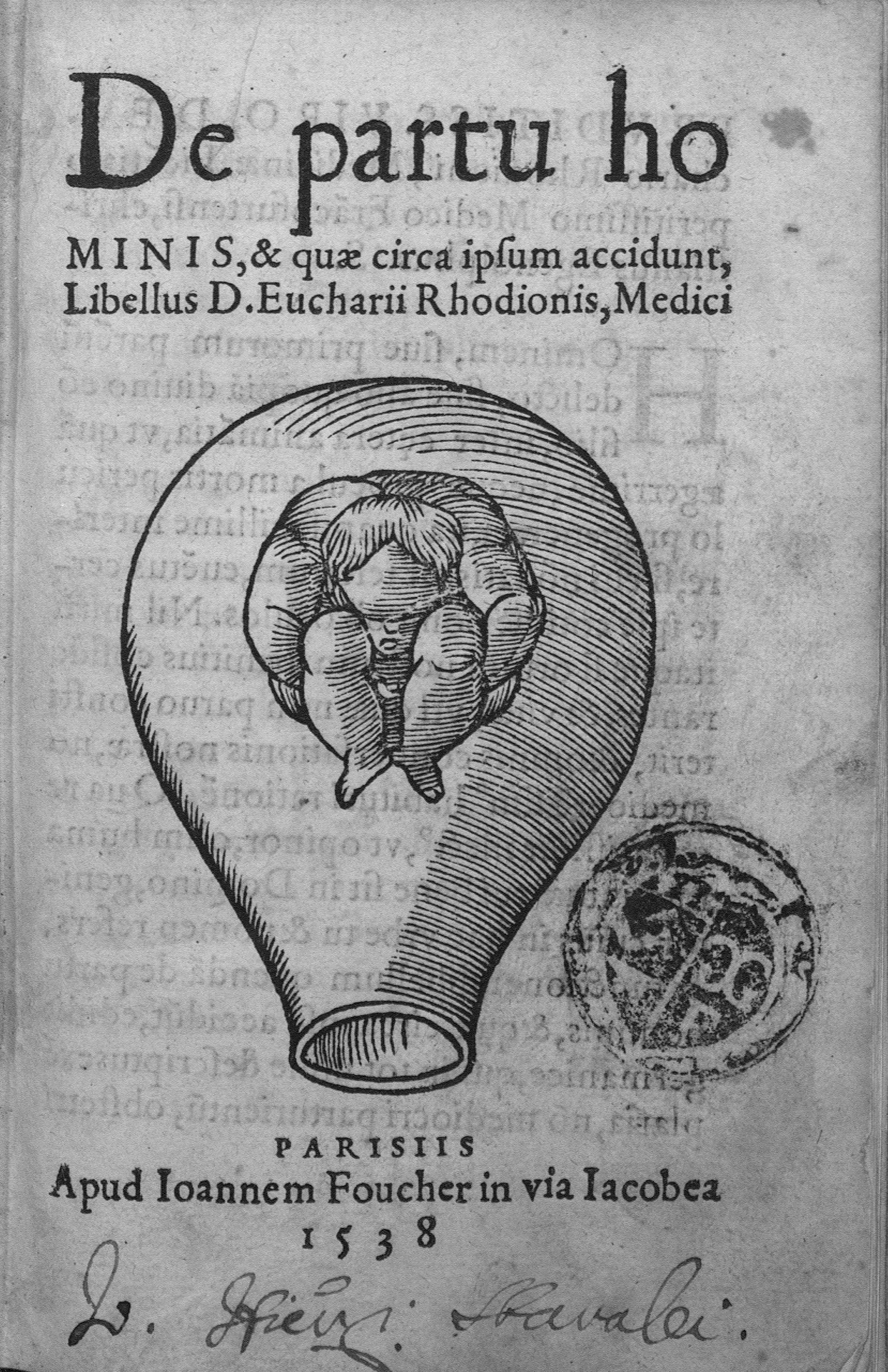
De partu hominis

- Garci Rodríguez de Montalvo – Amadis de Gaula Book 1 (translated into French by Nicolas de Herberay des Essarts at request of Francis I of France)
- Hector Boece – Historia Scotorum (translated into Middle Scots by John Bellenden at request of James V of Scotland)
- Rösslin – The Byrth of Mankynde (De partu hominis, translation attributed to Richard Jonas)
- Georg Joachim Rheticus – De libris revolutionum Copernici narratio prima (abstract of Copernicus' De revolutionibus orbium coelestium)

=== Poetry ===
- Tontada Siddhesavara – Shatsthala Jnanamrita
- Souterliedekens (Dutch metrical psalter dedicated to and perhaps compiled by Willem van Zuylen van Nijevelt)

Approximate year

- Sir Thomas More – Lady Fortune
- Girolamo Schola – Capituli di M. Girolamo Schola sopra varii suggetti

== Births ==
- January 26 – Florent Chrestien, French satirist and Latin poet (died 1596)
- June 11 – Barnabe Googe, English pastoral poet and translator (died 1594)
- unknown dates
  - Pierre de Bourdeille, seigneur de Brantôme, French soldier, historian and poet (died 1614)
  - Rhys Cain, Welsh-language poet (died 1614)
  - Frei Agostinho da Cruz (brother of Diogo Bernardes), Portuguese poet (died 1619)

== Deaths ==
- May 6 – Juan Luis Vives, Spanish humanist polymath (born 1493)
- May 22 – Francesco Guicciardini, Italian historian and statesman (born 1483)
- October 5 – Helius Eobanus Hessus, German Latin poet (born 1488)
- October – Robert Redman, London printer
