= 1545 in literature =

This article contains information about the literary events and publications of 1545.

== Events ==
- April 2 – Italian scholar Pietro Bembo, on reading Giovanni Battista Ramusio's Description of Africa, a translation from dictation by Leo Africanus, comments: "I cannot imagine how a man could have so much detailed information about these things."

== New books ==
=== Prose ===
- Roger Ascham – Toxophilus
- Girolamo Cardano – Ars Magna
- Bernard Etxepare – Linguae Vasconum Primitiae (first book printed in Basque language)
- Sir John Fortescue – De laudibus legum Angliae (written c. 1471)
- Gerolamo Cardano - Ars Magna
- Catherine Parr – Prayers or Meditations (first book published by an English queen under her own name)
- Thomas Phaer – The Boke of Chyldren
- A Proper Newe Booke of Cokerye

=== Poetry ===
- See 1545 in poetry

== Births ==
- May 1 – Franciscus Junius the elder, French theologian (died 02)Woodward, Bernard Bolingbroke; Cates, William Leist Readwin (1872). Encyclopaedia of Chronology: Historical and Biographical. Lee and Shepard. p. 786.
- June 6 – Jerome Gratian, Spanish Carmelite writer (died 1614)
- unknown date
  - George Bannatyne, collector of Scottish poems (died 1608)
  - Heinrich Bünting, German theologian and cartographer (died 1606)
- Probable year – John Gerard(e), English botanist and author of herbal (died 1612)

== Deaths ==
- April 3 – Antonio de Guevara, Spanish chronicler and moralist (born c. 1481)
- April 14 – Sir Thomas Clere, English poet
- July 7 – Pernette Du Guillet, French poet (born c. 1520)
