= List of years in literature =

This article gives a chronological list of years in literature, with notable publications listed with their respective years and a small selection of notable events. The time covered in individual years covers Renaissance, Baroque and Modern literature, while Medieval literature is resolved by century.

Note: List of years in poetry exists specifically for poetry.

See Table of years in literature for an overview of all "year in literature" pages.

Several attempts have been made to create a list of world literature. Among these are the great books project including the book series Great Books of the Western World, now containing 60 volumes. In 1998 Modern Library, an American publishing company, polled its editorial board to find the best 100 novels of the 20th century: Modern Library 100 Best Novels. These attempts have been criticized for their anglophone bias and disregard of other literary traditions.

== Ancient times ==
- Ancient Arabic literature - Antarah ibn Shaddad, Imru' al-Qais
- Ancient Chinese literature - Confucius, Han Fei, Laozi, Mencius, Sima Qian, Xunzi, Zhuang Zhou
- Ancient Greek literature - Aeschylus, Aesop, Aristophanes, Aristotle, Euripides, Herodotus, Hesiod, Homer, Pindar, Plato, Sappho, Sophocles, Thucydides
- Ancient Indian literature - Aśvaghoṣa, Kalidasa, Nagarjuna, Patanjali, The Buddha, Valmiki, Vishnu Sharma, Vyasa
- Ancient Persian literature - Zoroaster
- Ancient Roman literature - Catullus, Cicero, Horace, Juvenal, Livy, Lucretius, Ovid, Seneca the Younger, Suetonius, Tacitus, Virgil
- Late Antiquity - Ambrose, Augustine of Hippo, Boethius, Jerome, Mani, Origen, Philo, Plotinus
- Avesta (Ancient Iran)
- Book of the Dead (Ancient Egypt)
- Classic of Poetry (Ancient China)
- Epic of Gilgamesh (Mesopotamia)
- Hebrew Bible (Ancient Israel / Near East)
- Homeric Hymns (Ancient Greece)
- I Ching (Ancient China)
- New Testament (Early Christian world)
- Vedas, Upanishads (Ancient India)

== Middle Ages ==
- 6th to 9th centuries in literature – The Quran; Book of Kells; Nihon Shoki; Beowulf; Book of Taliesin; Book of Dede Korkut; Wenyuan Yinghua; Taiping Guangji; Great Tang Records on the Western Regions; Miscellaneous Morsels from Youyang
- 10th century in literature – One Thousand and One Nights; The Tale of the Bamboo Cutter
- 11th century in literature – The Song of Roland; The Tale of Genji – Murasaki Shikibu;The Pillow Book – Sei Shonagon
- 12th century in literature – Hayy ibn Yaqdhan – Ibn Tufail; Tristan and Iseult; Táin Bó Cúailnge; Cantar de mio Cid
- 13th century in literature – Theologus Autodidactus; Gesta Romanorum – Ibn al-Nafis; The Travels of Marco Polo – Marco Polo; Golden Legend; Poetic Edda; The Secret History of the Mongols
- 14th century in literature – The Divine Comedy – Dante Alighieri; The Decameron – Giovanni Boccaccio; Canterbury Tales – Geoffrey Chaucer; The Tale of the Heike (1371); Sir Gawain and the Green Knight – The Pearl Poet; Romance of the Three Kingdoms – Luo Guanzhong; Water Margin – Shi Nai'an
- 15th century in literature – Johann Gutenberg prints the Vulgate Bible; Le Morte d'Arthur – Sir Thomas Malory; The Book of the City of Ladies – Christine de Pizan; Le Testament – François Villon
- 1500 in literature – The Second Shepherds' Play by The Wakefield Master; books printed in 1500 or before are considered incunabula

== 16th century ==
=== 1500s ===
- 1501 in literature – Marko Marulic – Judita; Margery Kempe's The Book of Margery Kempe
- 1502 in literature – Shin Maha Thilawuntha's Yazawin Kyaw
- 1503 in literature – Robin Hood and the Potter
- 1504 in literature – Jacopo Sannazaro's Arcadia; Beunans Meriasek
- 1505 in literature – Pietro Bembo's Gli Asolani
- 1506 in literature – William Dunbar's The Dance of the Sevin Deidly Synnis
- 1507 in literature – Matthias Ringmann's Cosmographiae Introductio
- 1508 in literature – John Lydgate's The Complaint of the Black Knight; Elia Levita's Bovo-Bukh; first printing of Garci Rodríguez de Montalvo's Amadís de Gaula
- 1509 in literature – Erasmus's The Praise of Folly; Luca Pacioli's Divina proportione

=== 1510s ===
- 1510 in literature – Rodríguez de Montalvo's Las sergas de Esplandián
- 1511 in literature – Erasmus – The Praise of Folly; Wynkyn de Worde's The Demaudes Joyous
- 1512 in literature – Hakob Meghapart's Urbatagirk
- 1513 in literature – Meghapart's Parzatumar
- 1514 in literature – Julius Excluded from Heaven
- 1515 in literature – Ciolek's Missal
- 1516 in literature – Ariosto – Orlando Furioso; Thomas More – Utopia
- 1517 in literature – Martin Luther's Ninety-five Theses, Gil Vicente's A Trilogia das Barcas
- 1518 in literature – Tantrakhyan; Erasmus's Colloquies
- 1519 in literature – Bergadis' Apokopos; Miller Atlas by Lopo Homem, Pedro Reinel and Jorge Reinel; The Abbreviacion of Statutis by John Rastell

=== 1520s ===
- 1520 in literature – Complutensian Polyglot Bible, Yazawin Kyaw (part 2); John Heywood's Johan Johan The Husband
- 1521 in literature – Reis' Kitab-i Bahriye, Goražde Psalter; Henry VIII's Defence of the Seven Sacraments
- 1522 in literature – Luther Bible, New Testament translation by Martin Luther; Mirabilis Liber
- 1523 in literature – Thomas More's Responsio ad Lutherum
- 1524 in literature – Birth of Luís de Camões and Pierre de Ronsard; I Modi (first edition) by Marcantonio Raimondi; Johann Walter's Eyn geystlich Gesangk Buchleyn; Erfurt Enchiridion; Cèllere Codex;
- 1525 in literature – Luther's Against the Murderous, Thieving Hordes of Peasants; Tyndale Bible
- 1526 in literature – Tronoša Chronicle
- 1527 in literature – Pietro Aretino's Sonetti Lussuriosi; I Modi (second edition), expanded by Pietro Aretino
- 1528 in literature – Baltissare Castiglione – The Book of the Courtier; Francisco Delicado's Portrait of Lozana: The Lusty Andalusian Woman
- 1529 in literature – A Proper Dialogue Between A Gentleman and a Husbandman

=== 1530s ===
- 1530 in literature – Amadis of Greece (Feliciano de Silva), Thurnierbuch (Georg Rüxner)
- 1531 in literature – Collectanea satis copiosa, The Book of the Governor (Thomas Elyot), Huexotzinco Codex, The Praier and Complaynte of the Ploweman unto Christe (first printing), Discourses on Livy (Machiavelli); Emblemata
- 1532 in literature – The Prince (Machiavelli)
- 1533 in literature – Three Books of Occult Philosophy (Heinrich Cornelius Agrippa)
- 1534 in literature – Luther Bible translation by Martin Luther, Gargantua (Rabelais), Psychopannychia (Calvin)
- 1535 in literature – Christiad (Marco Girolamo Vida)
- 1536 in literature – Institutes of the Christian Religion (Calvin), Swenske songer eller wisor 1536
- 1537 in literature – Matthew Bible, De arte canendi (second volume, Heyden)
- 1538 in literature – Œuvres (Clément Marot)
- 1539 in literature – Great Bible, Kreutterbuch (Hieronymus Bock)

=== 1540s ===
- 1540 in literature – De la pirotechnia (Biringuccio), Padmavat (Malik Muhammad Jayasi)
- 1541 in literature – Orbecche (Giraldi)
- 1542 in literature – Luca Landucci's diary ends; Andrew Boorde publishes Egipt speche, the earliest Romani language writing
- 1543 in literature – Abckiria (Mikael Agricola), De humani corporis fabrica (Vesalius), De revolutionibus orbium coelestium (Copernicus)
- 1544 in literature – Cosmographia (Münster), Antwerp songbook
- 1545 in literature – Toxophilus (Roger Ascham), Ars Magna (Gerolamo Cardano), A Proper Newe Booke of Cokerye
- 1546 in literature – De Natura Fossilium (Georg Bauer), Farnese Hours (Giulio Clovio)
- 1547 in literature – Arte para aprender la lengua mexicana (Andrés de Olmos), Catechism of Martynas Mažvydas, Les voyages aventureux du Capitaine Martin de Hoyarsal, habitant du çubiburu (Martin de Hoyarçabal)
- 1548 in literature – Se Wsi Testamenti (Mikael Agricola), Oll synnwyr pen Kembero ygyd (Gruffudd Hiraethog)
- 1549 in literature – Book of Common Prayer, The Complaynt of Scotland, Notes on Muscovite Affairs (Sigismund von Herberstein), Belfagor arcidiavolo (Machiavelli)

=== 1550s ===
- 1550 in literature – Fengshen Yanyi (Xu Zhonglin), Abecedarium (Trubar), Liao-Fan's Four Lessons, Lives of the Most Excellent Painters, Sculptors, and Architects (Vasari), Svaramelakalanidhi (Ramamatya)
- 1551 in literature – Prutenic Tables (Erasmus Reinhold), Stoglav
- 1552 in literature – Gunamala (Sankardev), A Short Account of the Destruction of the Indies (de las Casas), Historia general de las Indias (López de Gómara)
- 1553 in literature – Christianismi Restitutio (Servetus), Observations (Pierre Belon), Scepter of Judah (Solomon ibn Verga)
- 1554 in literature – Lazarillo de Tormes
- 1555 in literature – Gosudarev Rodoslovets, Les Prophéties (Nostradamus), Meshari (Gjon Buzuku)
- 1556 in literature – De re metallica (Agricola)
- 1557 in literature – Mirat ul Memalik (Seydi Ali Reis), Physica speculatio (Alonso Gutiérrez), Tottel's Miscellany, The Whetstone of Witte (Records)
- 1558 in literature – Heptaméron (Marguerite de Navarre), The First Blast of the Trumpet Against the Monstruous Regiment of Women (Knox), Il Galateo (Della Casa)
- 1559 in literature – Elizabethan Book of Common Prayer, Magdeburg Centuries (first volume), The History of the Reformation in Scotland (completed in 1566) by John Knox

=== 1560s ===
- 1560 in literature – Geneva Bible (first full edition), L'Amadigi (Tasso), De Gestis Mendi de Saa (de Anchiata)
- 1561 in literature – Beware the Cat (Baldwin), Peresopnytsia Gospel, Gorboduc (Norton and Sackville); Tianyi Ge library founded
- 1562 in literature – The Tragical History of Romeus and Juliet (Arthur Brooke), The Five Orders of Architecture (da Vignola); Mrkšina crkva printing house founded
- 1563 in literature – Foxe's Book of Martyrs, De praestigiis daemonum (Weyer), Heidelberg Catechism
- 1564 in literature – Anatomes totius (Vesalius), Ausbund, Enchiridion of Dietrich Philips
- 1565 in literature – De Rerum Natura juxta Propria Principia (Telesio), Chess (Kochanowski), Shulchan Aruch (Karo)
- 1566 in literature – "The Palace of Pleasure" (William Painter), A Caveat or Warning for Common Cursitors (Harman), Table Talk (Luther)
- 1567 in literature – Welsh Bible (Salesbury), Horestes (Pickering), Isabella Whitney's first poems published, Lope de Rueda's works published; Red Lion theatre built
- 1568 in literature – Lives of the Most Excellent Painters, Sculptors, and Architects (Giorgio Vasari), Bannatyne Manuscript, De optimo senatore (Wawrzyniec Grzymala Goslicki), Plantin Polyglot, Fishing and Fishermen's Talk (Hektorovic)
- 1569 in literature – La Araucana, part 1 (Alonso de Ercilla), Thomissøn's hymnal, Florentine Codex

=== 1570s ===
- 1570 in literature – Theatrum Orbis Terrarum (Ortelius), Doria Atlas, Lafreri atlases (approximate date)
- 1571 in literature – Arte de la lengua mexicana y castellana and Vocabulario en lengua castellana y mexicana (de Molina), The Books of Homilies (third volume), Ragione di adoprar sicuramente l'Arme, si da offesa come da difesa (Giacomo di Grassi)
- 1572 in literature – Franciade (de Ronsard), Os Lusíadas (de Camões)
- 1573 in literature – Etz Chaim (Chaim Vital), Aminta (Tasso)
- 1574 in literature – Right of Magistrates (Beza), Exercicio quotidiano
- 1575 in literature – Arbatel de magia veterum, Terze rime (Veronica Franco)
- 1576 in literature – The Pattern of Painful Adventures, Discourse on Voluntary Servitude (La Boétie), The Princely Pleasures, at the Court at Kenilworth (Gascoigne)
- 1577 in literature – The Interior Castle (Teresa of Ávila), The Lives of the Saints (Skarga), Pseudomonarchia Daemonum (Weyer)
- 1578 in literature – Compendium of Materia Medica (Li Shizhen), Euphues (Lyly), History of a Voyage to the Land of Brazil (Jean de Léry)
- 1579 in literature – Hanthawaddy Hsinbyushin Ayedawbon (Yazataman), Bible of Kralice, The Shepheardes Calender (Spenser)

=== 1580s ===
- 1580 in literature – Essays (Montaigne), Laments (Kochanowski), Prashna Tantra (Neelakantha), Tarikh-i-Sher Shahi (Abbas Sarwani)
- 1581 in literature – Second Book of Discipline, Jerusalem Delivered (Tasso), Ostrog Bible
- 1582 in literature – Divers Voyages (Richard Hakluyt), The Monument of Matrones, Piae Cantiones (Finno)
- 1583 in literature – The Anatomie of Abuses (Stubbes), De Heptarchia Mystica (Dee), De Constantia (Lipsius)
- 1584 in literature – Campaspe, Sapho and Phao (John Lyly), Jixiao Xinshu (second edition), Guðbrandsbiblía, Some Reulis and Cautelis to be observit and eschewit in Scottis poesie (James VI of Scotland)
- 1585 in literature – La Galatea (Cervantes), The Good Huswifes Jewell (Dawson), The Seven Deadly Sins (Tarlton)
- 1586 in literature – De Beghinselen Der Weeghconst (Stevin)
- 1587 in literature – A discourse of the subtill practises of deuilles by witches and sorcerers (George Gifford), Collected Statutes of the Ming Dynasty (second edition), Historia von D. Johann Fausten, Anfitriões (de Camões)
- 1588 in literature – The Battle of Alcazar (date first performed; George Peele), The Misfortunes of Arthur (Hughes), Pandosto (Greene), Tamburlaine (Marlowe)
- 1589 in literature – The Passionate Shepherd to His Love (Christopher Marlowe), The Reason of State (Botero)

=== 1590s ===
- 1590 in literature – Tamburlaine (Marlowe, both parts published); Arcadia (Sidney), A Book to Burn (Li Zhi), Caigentan (Hong), Kao Pan Yu Shi (Tu Long), Vizsoly Bible
- 1591 in literature – The Taming of the Shrew (Shakespeare, approximate date), Astrophel and Stella (Sidney), Mateh Moshe, Postil of Jonas Bretkunas
- 1592 in literature – Journey to the West (Wu Cheng'en), Codex Huamantla, Pierce Penniless (Nashe), Doctor Faustus (Marlowe, approximate date)
- 1593 in literature – The Phoenix Nest, Brevis commentarius de Islandia (Jónsson), Jakub Wujek Bible
- 1594 in literature – The Unfortunate Traveller (Nashe), Theatrum artis scribendi (Hondius), Codex iconographicus monacensis 236, Satire Ménippée
- 1595 in literature – A Midsummer Night's Dream, (Shakespeare), Korjenic-Neoric Armorial, Muntakhab-ut-Tawarikh (?Abd al-Qadir Badayuni), Prophecy of the Popes (Wion)
- 1596 in literature – The Faerie Queene (Spenser, Books 4–6), The Blind Beggar of Alexandria (Chapman)
- 1597 in literature – Romeo and Juliet (Shakespeare), Essays (Francis Bacon), The Merchant of Venice (Shakespeare, approximate date), Eight sermons before the Sejm (Skarga), Apparatus ad omnium gentium historiam (Possevino), Mysterium Cosmographicum (Kepler)
- 1598 in literature – Golestan-e Honar (Ghoma), Henry IV, Part 2 (Shakespeare, approximate date)
- 1599 in literature – Henry V and Julius Caesar (Shakespeare), Guzmán de Alfarache (Alemán), Basilikon Doron (King James VI), Postil of Mikalojus Daukša, The Model of Poesy (Scott)
- 1600 in literature – As You Like It (Shakespeare), Englands Helicon (Flasket), Will Kemp's "Nine Days Wonder", Erofili (Chortatzis)

== 17th century ==
=== 1600s ===
- 1601 in literature – Hamlet (Shakespeare, approximate date), Twelfth Night (Shakespeare), The Triumphs of Oriana (Morley), Leucippe and Clitophon (first printed)
- 1602 in literature – La Argentina (Centenera), Bahr al-Hayat (Muhammad Ghawth, approximate date), The City of the Sun (Campanella)
- 1603 in literature – Othello (Shakespeare, approximate date), Nippo Jisho, The Wonderfull Yeare (Dekker). First kabuki performances
- 1604 in literature – Altan Tobchi (Guush Luvsandanzan), Schilder-boeck (van Mander)
- 1605 in literature – Don Quixote de la Mancha (Part 1; Cervantes), Fastiginia (da Veiga), Mundus Alter et Idem (Hall), The Advancement of Learning (Bacon)
- 1606 in literature – King Lear and Macbeth (Shakespeare, approximate date), Ryukyu Shinto-ki
- 1607 in literature – L'Astrée (d'Urfé, first part), Atheism Conquered (Campanella), Tom a Lincoln (Johnson, second part)
- 1608 in literature – Somnium (Kepler), Journey from Bohemia to the Holy Land, by way of Venice and the Sea (Harant), Shoumei (Heinouchi)
- 1609 in literature – Shakespeare's sonnets published, Epicœne, or The Silent Woman (Jonson), Comentarios Reales de los Incas (de la Vega), Sancai Tuhui (Wang Qi)

=== 1610s ===
- 1610 in literature – Muyejebo, Sidereus Nuncius (Galileo), True Reportory (Strachey)
- 1611 in literature – King James Bible, The Tempest (Shakespeare), Runa ABC (Bureus), Salve Deus Rex Judaeorum (Lanier)
- 1612 in literature – Malay Annals (oldest known version), The Beginning and Progress of the Muscovy War (Zólkiewski), Vocabolario degli Accademici della Crusca
- 1613 in literature – Novelas ejemplares (Cervantes), Dongui Bogam (Heo Jun), Jatakalankara (Ganesa), Soledades (de Góngora)
- 1614 in literature – Alma Academia Leidensis, Jibong yuseol (Yi), 1614 Low German Bible
- 1615 in literature – Don Quixote de la Mancha (second part, Cervantes), Zihui (Mei), De Christiana expeditione apud Sinas (Ricci)
- 1616 in literature – Chess or the King's Game (Augustus the Younger), Koyo Gunkan (Kosaka), Krista Purana (Stephens), A Description of New England (Smith)
- 1617 in literature – Dhola Maru, Wamyo Ruijusho (large edition)
- 1618 in literature – The Dog in the Manger (Lope de Vega), Speculum Sophicum Rhodostauroticum
- 1619 in literature – Fuenteovejuna (Lope de Vega), The Maid's Tragedy (Beaumont and Fletcher)

=== 1620s ===
- 1620 in literature – Novum Organum (Bacon), Septimana Philosophica (Maier), Haec-Vir, Stories Old and New and The Three Sui Quash the Demons' Revolt (Feng)
- 1621 in literature – The Anatomy of Melancholy (Burton), The Countess of Montgomery's Urania (Wroth), Wubei Zhi (Mao)
- 1622 in literature – Mourt's Relation (Winslow and Bradford), Palazzi di Genova (Rubens), La secchia rapita (Tapoti)
- 1623 in literature – First Folio (Shakespeare), Labyrinth of the World and Paradise of the Heart (Comenius), Zhifang Waiji
- 1624 in literature – Devotions upon Emergent Occasions (Donne), Emblemata of Zinne-werck (de Brune), Stories to Caution the World (Feng), De Veritate (Herbert)
- 1625 in literature – De jure belli ac pacis (Grotius), Musaeum Hermeticum (Jennis), Pamietnik handlowca (Stefanski)
- 1626 in literature – New Atlantis (Bacon), El Buscón (de Quevedo), The Jews' Tragedy (Heminges, written)
- 1627 in literature – Stories to Awaken the World (Feng), Los Sueños (de Quevedo), Diagrams and explanations of the wonderful machines of the Far West (Shreck and Wang)
- 1628 in literature – Institutes of the Lawes of England (Coke), The Lover's Melancholy (Ford)
- 1629 in literature – Janua linguarum reserata (Comenius), Alphabetum Ibericum sive Georgianum cum Oratione, Mélite (Corneille)

=== 1630s ===
- 1630 in literature – Pathomachia
- 1631 in literature – The Swisser (Wilson)
- 1632 in literature – Dialogue Concerning the Two Chief World Systems (Galileo), Histriomastix (Prynne)
- 1633 in literature – Holy Sonnets (Donne)
- 1634 in literature – Somnium (Kepler), The Mysteryes of Nature and Art (Bate)
- 1635 in literature – Dijing Jingwulue (Liu Tong)
- 1636 in literature – the Annals of the Four Masters are completed, Pentamerone (Basile), Yesipov Chronicle
- 1637 in literature – Discourse on the Method (Descartes), Tiangong Kaiwu (Song)
- 1638 in literature – The Man in the Moone (Godwin), El Carnero (Freyle)
- 1637-Lycidas
- 1639 in literature – Tesoro de la lengua guaraní, The Unnatural Combat (Massinger)

=== 1640s ===
- 1640 in literature – Meditations on First Philosophy (Descartes), Arte da Lingoa Canarim (Stephens), Augustinus (Jansen), Bay Psalm Book, On Yixing Tea Pot (Zhou Gaochi), A Supplement to the Journey to the West (Shen Yue)
- 1641 in literature – Leyen Spiegel, A Description of the Famous Kingdome of Macaria (Plattes), Flandria Illustrata (Sanderus)
- 1642 in literature – De Cive (Hobbes), Tohfatu'l-Ahbab (Muhammad Ali Kashmiri), Le Vite de’ Pittori, Scultori et Architetti (Baglione)
- 1643 in literature – Cazania lui Varlaam, Gero (Agerre), A History of Tibet by the Fifth Dalai Lama of Tibet, Shinra no Kiroku (Matsumae Kagehiro)
- 1644 in literature – Areopagitica and Of Education (Milton), Principles of Philosophy (Descartes)
- 1645 in literature – The Book of Five Rings and Dokkodo (Musashi), Epistolae Ho-Elianae (Howell), L'huomo di lettere (Bartoli)
- 1646 in literature – Estebanillo González, Gangraena (Edwardes), Pseudodoxia Epidemica (Browne)
- 1647 in literature – The Advice to Hartlib (Petty), Beaumont and Fletcher folios (first edition), The Siege of Sziget (Zrinski, written)
- 1648 in literature – Hesperides (Herrick), Image of the Virgin Mary Mother of God of Guadalupe, Padmavati (Alaol)
- 1649 in literature – Historia Lettica (Einhorn), Huei tlamahuiçoltica (de la Vega), Leabhar na nGenealach (Dubhaltach MacFhirbhisigh), Prasna Marga (Narayanan Nambutiri)

=== 1650s ===
- 1650 in literature – Chūzan Seikan (Sho Shoken), The Tenth Muse Lately Sprung Up in America (Bradstreet), Il Conquisto di Granata (Graziani), Vrhobreznica Chronicle
- 1651 in literature – Thomas Hobbes's Leviathan, The Dancing Master (Playford), Abagar (Filip Stanislavov), Bahar-i Danish (Inayat Allah Kamboh)
- 1652 in literature – Theatrum Chemicum Britannicum (Ashmole), Alcibiades the Schoolboy, Oedipus Aegyptiacus (Kircher)
- 1653 in literature – The Compleat Angler (Walton), Logopandecteision (Urquhart)
- 1654 in literature – Dasbodh (Ramdas), Appius and Virginia (Webster)
- 1655 in literature – Dabestan-e Mazaheb, De Corpore (Hobbes), Tarikh al-Sudan (Abd al-Sadi); Junius manuscript first published
- 1656 in literature – The Commonwealth of Oceana (Harrington), Mizan al-haqq (Kâtip Çelebi)
- 1657 in literature – Comical History of the States and Empires of the Moon (Cyrano de Bergerac), Lettres provinciales (Pascal), The Siege of Rhodes (Davenant),
- 1658 in literature – Heutelia, Ping Shan Leng Yan, The Garden of Cyrus (Browne)
- 1659 in literature – Shajara-i Tarakima (Abu al-Ghazi Bahadur), The Contention of Ajax and Ulysses (Shirley)

=== 1660s ===
- 1660 in literature – Martyrs Mirror (van Braght), Critici sacri (Pearson); Samuel Pepys opens his diary
- 1661 in literature – The Faithful Friends (first printed), A Cure for a Cuckold (Fletcher, first printed), Putni tovaruš (Zrinska)
- 1662 in literature – Molière's L'école des femmes, The Princess of Montpensier (De La Fayette), Erdeniin Tobchi, Port-Royal Logic, Het Gulden Cabinet (de Bie); Traditional puppet play Punch and Judy first performed
- 1663 in literature – Eliot Indian Bible, The Playhouse to Be Let (Davenant); Académie des Inscriptions et Belles-Lettres founded; first Theatre Royal, Drury Lane founded
- 1664 in literature – Molière's Tartuffe, Technica Curiosa (Schott), Sylva, or A Discourse of Forest-Trees and the Propagation of Timber (Evelyn), Hudibras (Butler, second part)
- 1665 in literature – Contes et nouvelles en vers (De La Fontaine), Historia Eustachio Mariana (Kercher); Philosophical Transactions of the Royal Society begins publication
- 1666 in literature – Gottfried Leibniz's De Arte Combinatoria ('On the Art of Combination'); Margaret Cavendish's The Blazing World, Cuimre na nGenealach
- 1667 in literature – John Milton's Paradise Lost, China Illustrata (Kircher), Hatata (Zera Yacob)
- 1668 in literature – Hans Jakob Christoffel von Grimmelshausen's Simplicius Simplicissimus, Bibliotheca Fratrum Polonorum quos Unitarios vocant, Description of Africa (Dapper), Een Bloemhof (Koerbagh), The Isle of Pines (Neville)
- 1669 in literature – Jean Racine's Britannicus, Letters of a Portuguese Nun (comte de Guilleragues)

=== 1670s ===
- 1670 in literature – Le Bourgeois gentilhomme (Molière), Tractatus Theologico-Politicus (Spinoza), Pensées (Pascal)
- 1671 in literature – Samson Agonistes (Milton), Gartlic za cas kratiti (Frankopan), De Nieuwe en Onbekende Weereld (Montanus)
- 1672 in literature – Les Femmes Savantes (Molière), Loimologia (Hodges), The Lives of the Artists (Bellori)
- 1673 in literature – The Floating Island (Head), Lapponia (Schefferus)
- 1674 in literature – Nouveaux contes (Jean de la Fontaine), Le Théâtre François (Chappuzeau), Jammers Minde (Leonora Christina)
- 1675 in literature – The Country Wife (Wycherley), History of the Sevarambians (Vairasse), Teutsche Academie (von Sandrart)
- 1676 in literature – The Southern Land, Known (de Foigny), Truth's Triumph (Tomkinson), The Man of Mode (Etherege)
- 1677 in literature – Phèdre (Racine), Ethics (Spinoza)
- 1678 in literature – The Pilgrim's Progress (John Bunyan), La Princesse de Clèves, Mowing-Devil
- 1679 in literature – Beaumont and Fletcher folios (second volume), Strange Stories from a Chinese Studio (Pu Songling, written in this year)

=== 1680s ===
- 1680 in literature – The Orphan by Thomas Otway; Leabhar Cloinne Aodha Buidhe by Ruairí Ó hUiginn; The Life and Death of Mr Badman by John Bunyan. Death of Samuel Butler
- 1681 in literature – The History of King Lear by Nahum Tate; An Historical Relation of the Island Ceylon by Robert Knox; Absalom and Achitophel by John Dryden
- 1682 in literature – The Holy War by John Bunyan; Frame of Government of Pennsylvania by William Penn; Mac Flecknoe by John Dryden; Venice Preserv'd by Thomas Otway
- 1683 in literature – The London Jilt attributed to Alexander Oldys; Venus in the Cloister by the pseudonymous writer Abbé du Prat. Death of Izaak Walton
- 1684 in literature – Love-Letters Between a Nobleman and His Sister attributed to Aphra Behn; Letters Writ by a Turkish Spy attributed to Giovanni Paolo Marana; Sodom, or the Quintessence of Debauchery attributed to John Wilmot, 2nd Earl of Rochester; Odiljenje sigetsko by Pavao Ritter Vitezovic; Bibliotheca antitrinitariorum by Christopher Sandius. Death of Pierre Corneille
- 1685 in literature – Bibliotheca Anatomica by Daniel Le Clerc and Jean-Jacques Manget; Cuneus Prophetarum by Pjetër Bogdani
- 1686 in literature – Conversations on the Plurality of Worlds by Bernard Le Bovier de Fontenelle
- 1687 in literature – Isaac Newton, Philosophiæ Naturalis Principia Mathematica; John Dryden The Hind and the Panther
- 1688 in literature – Aphra Behn, Oroonoko. Death of John Bunyan
- 1689 in literature – John Locke, An Essay Concerning Human Understanding. Death of Aphra Behn

=== 1690s ===
- 1690 in literature – A Letter to a Friend (Browne), Dioclesian (Purcell), Amphitryon (Dryden)
- 1691 in literature – Athalie (Racine), Sarumino
- 1692 in literature – L'Impromptu de la garnison de Namur, Banmin chohoki
- 1693 in literature – The Old Bachelor and The Double Dealer (Congreve), The Carnal Prayer Mat (Li Yu), Some Thoughts Concerning Education (Locke), Wonders of the Invisible World (Mather)
- 1694 in literature – First complete edition of Dictionnaire de l'Académie française, Het Menselyk Bedryf ("The Book of Trades") (Luyken)
- 1695 in literature – Love for Love (Congreve), Khulasat-ut-Tawarikh (Sujan Rai), Guwen Guanzhi
- 1696 in literature – Love's Last Shift (Cibber), The Relapse (Vanbrugh), She Ventures and He Wins (Ariadne), Sri Charitropakhyan, The Inhumane Cardinal; or, Innocence Betrayed (Pix)
- 1697 in literature – Histoires ou contes du temps passé (Perrault), Belle-Belle ou Le Chevalier Fortuné (d'Aulnoy), Sabhasad Bakhar
- 1698 in literature – Short View of the Immorality and Profaneness of the English Stage (Collier), Tooke's Pantheon, Teague Land (Dunton), A New Dictionary of the Terms Ancient and Modern of the Canting Crew
- 1699 in literature – Les Aventures de Télémaque (Fénelon), Historia Histrionica (Wright), Kingo's hymnal. Death of Jean Racine
- 1700 in literature – The Way of the World – William Congreve. Death of John Dryden

== 18th century ==
=== 1700s ===
- 1701 in literature – A Discourse of the Contests and Dissensions Between the Nobles and the Commons in Athens and Rome – Jonathan Swift; The Ladies' Defence by Mary Chudleigh; Stemmatografia by Pavao Ritter Vitezovic
- 1702 in literature – The Narrow Road to the Interior – Matsuo Basho
- 1703 in literature – New Voyages to North America by Louis-Armand de Lom d'Arce de Lahontan, Baron de Lahontan; The Love Suicides at Sonezaki by Chikamatsu Monzaemon. Death of Samuel Pepys; Samuel Johnson
- 1704 in literature – A Tale of a Tub by Jonathan Swift; New Essays on Human Understanding by Gottfried Wilhelm Leibniz; The Storm by Daniel Defoe. Death of John Locke
- 1705 in literature – Money and Trade Considered by John Law
- 1706 in literature – The Apparition of Mrs. Veal by Daniel Defoe; The Recruiting Officer by George Farquhar
- 1707 in literature – Arithmetica Universalis – Isaac Newton
- 1708 in literature – An Argument against Abolishing Christianity – Jonathan Swift
- 1709 in literature – Ode à Sainte-Geneviève – Voltaire's first published work; First publication of the magazine Tatler, established by Richard Steele; The New Atalantis by Delarivier Manley; Turcaret by Alain-René Lesage

=== 1710s ===
- 1710 in literature – Colley Cibber becomes manager of Drury Lane; The Statute of Anne was the first statute to provide for copyright regulated by the government and courts, rather than by private parties; Théodicée by Gottfried Wilhelm Leibniz; Meditation Upon a Broomstick by Jonathan Swift; First publication of the newspaper The Examiner, edited by Jonathan Swift
- 1711 in literature – The Spectator is founded by Joseph Addison and Richard Steele; First print version of Jack the Giant Killer, published in two parts by J. White; The Courier for Hell by Chikamatsu Monzaemon; An Essay on Criticism by Alexander Pope
- 1712 in literature – Alexander Pope, The Rape of the Lock
- 1713 in literature – Birth of Laurence Sterne. First publication of the newspaper The Guardian, under publisher Richard Steele; First performance of Cato, a Tragedy by Joseph Addison; First printed version of Erotokritos by Vitsentzos Kornaros; Three Dialogues Between Hylas and Philonous by George Berkeley
- 1714 in literature – Bernard Mandeville, The Fable of the Bees
- 1715 in literature – Nicholas Rowe becomes Poet Laureate of Great Britain; Gil Blas by Alain-René Lesage; Divine Songs Attempted in Easy Language for the Use of Children by Isaac Watts; The Battles of Coxinga by Chikamatsu Monzaemon
- 1716 in literature – The Fifth Ode of the Fourth Book of Horace Imitated – Jane Brereton; Kangxi Dictionary, compiled by order of the Kangxi Emperor
- 1717 in literature – A Philosophical Inquiry Concerning Human Liberty – Anthony Collins; Three Hours After Marriage by John Gay, Alexander Pope and John Arbuthnot;
- 1718 in literature – Oedipus – Voltaire's first play
- 1719 in literature – Robinson Crusoe – Daniel Defoe

=== 1720s ===
- 1720 in literature – Daniel Defoe, Memoirs of a Cavalier
- 1721 in literature – Montesquieu, Persian Letters
- 1722 in literature – Daniel Defoe, Moll Flanders
- 1723 in literature – Births of Richard Price and Adam Smith; deaths of Susanna Centlivre and Marianna Alcoforado; – Voltaire, La Henriade;
- 1724 in literature – The Reform'd Coquet by Mary Davys; Roxana: The Fortunate Mistress and A tour thro' the whole island of Great Britain by Daniel Defoe; A General History of the Pyrates by Captain Charles Johnson; La Fausse Suivante by Pierre de Marivaux
- 1725 in literature – Birth of Giacomo Casanova; the encyclopaedia Complete Classics Collection of Ancient China is completed, edited by Chen Menglei and Jiang Tingxi. First printed version of The Book of Abramelin; A Dissertation on Liberty and Necessity, Pleasure and Pain by Benjamin Franklin; Fantomina by Eliza Haywood; Mariamne by Augustin Nadal
- 1726 in literature – Jonathan Swift, Gulliver's Travels
- 1727 in literature – Eliza Haywood, Philidore and Placentia; Double Falsehood by Lewis Theobald; Conjugal Lewdness by Daniel Defoe
- 1728 in literature – Alexander Pope, The Dunciad
- 1729 in literature – Second Thoughts Are Best by Daniel Defoe; A Modest Proposal by Jonathan Swift; Hurlothrumbo by Samuel Johnson. Death of William Congreve

=== 1730s ===
- 1730 in literature – The Game of Love and Chance – Pierre de Marivaux; Tom Thumb by Henry Fielding.
- 1731 in literature – Palisades Island (to 1743) – Johann Gottfried Schnabel; The Gentleman's Magazine is first published in London, its publisher was Edward Cave who coined the term "magazine" for a periodical. The newspaper Hollandsche Spectator is first published in Amsterdam, the publisher was the journalist Justus van Effen; La Vie de Marianne by Pierre de Marivaux; Manon Lescaut by Antoine François Prévost; Life of Sethos by Jean Terrasson
- 1732 in literature – The magazine Then Swänska Argus is first published in Sweden, written entirely by Olof von Dalin. The annual almanac Poor Richard's Almanack is first published, written by Benjamin Franklin. The London Magazine is first published, the second oldest literary periodical; Alciphron by George Berkeley; The Mock Doctor by Henry Fielding; The Triumph of Love by Pierre de Marivaux; Zaïre by Voltaire
- 1733 in literature – Letters Concerning the English Nation – Voltaire; Memoirs of the Twentieth Century – Samuel Madden; Essay on Man (to 1744) – Alexander Pope
- 1734 in literature – Copies of Voltaire's Letters on the English are burned, and a warrant is issued for the author's arrest. Le Paysan parvenu by Pierre de Marivaux; Chrononhotonthologos by Henry Carey; The Analyst by George Berkeley
- 1735 in literature – At the end of the trial of John Peter Zenger for seditious libel in the New York Weekly Journal, he is found not guilty by the jury determining that truth was a defense against charges of libel. História trágico-marítima by Bernardo Gomes de Brito; Systema Naturae by Carl Linnaeus
- 1736 in literature – Method of Fluxions – Isaac Newton
- 1737 in literature – Leonidas – Richard Glover. Birth of Thomas Paine, free thinker and revolutionary (died 1809); The Historical Register for the Year 1736 by Henry Fielding; The Golden Rump attributed to Henry Fielding; The newspaper The News Letter of Belfast is first published. It is the oldest English language general daily newspaper still in publication. A Faithful Narrative of the Surprising Work of God in the Conversion of Many Hundred Souls in Northampton by Jonathan Edwards; Les Fausses Confidences by Pierre de Marivaux
- 1738 in literature – Jewish Letters by Jean-Baptiste de Boyer, Marquis d'Argens; A Complete Collection of Genteel and Ingenious Conversation by Jonathan Swift; The Divine Legation of Moses by William Warburton
- 1739 in literature – A Treatise of Human Nature (to 1740) – David Hume

=== 1740s ===
- 1740 in literature – Institutions de physique – Émilie du Châtelet; Beauty and the Beast – Gabrielle-Suzanne Barbot de Villeneuve; Pamela; or, Virtue Rewarded – Samuel Richardson
- 1741 in literature – An Apology for the Life of Mrs. Shamela Andrews – Henry Fielding; Niels Klim's Underground Travels – Ludvig Holberg
- 1742 in literature – Joseph Andrews – Henry Fielding
- 1743 in literature – The Life and Death of Jonathan Wild, the Great – Henry Fielding; Servant of Two Masters by Carlo Goldoni first performed
- 1744 in literature – The Female Spectator is launched by Eliza Haywood; The Harleian Miscellany by Samuel Johnson and William Oldys; A Little Pretty Pocket-Book by John Newbery; Tommy Thumb's Pretty Song Book; The Pleasures of the Imagination by Mark Akenside; Life of Mr Richard Savage by Samuel Johnson
- 1745 in literature – Description of the Kingdom of Georgia by Vakhushti of Kartli; Flora Svecica by Carl Linnaeus; Nowe Ateny by Benedykt Chmielowski; Suomalaisen Sana-Lugun Coetus by Daniel Juslenius. Death of Jonathan Swift
- 1746 in literature – Voltaire is elected to the French Academy; Den Danske Vitruvius by Lauritz de Thurah; Le Préjugé vaincu by Pierre de Marivaux; Sugawara Denju Tenarai Kagami by Takeda Izumo I, Takeda Izumo II, Namiki Sosuke and Miyoshi Shoraku
- 1747 in literature – Clarissa (to 1748) – Samuel Richardson
- 1748 in literature – Fanny Hill – John Cleland; An Enquiry Concerning Human Understanding – David Hume
- 1749 in literature – The History of Tom Jones, a Foundling – Henry Fielding

=== 1750s ===
- 1750 in literature – The Rambler essays (to 1752) – Samuel Johnson; The Liar, I pettegolezzi delle donne, Il teatro comico, and Il vero amico by Carlo Goldoni; Discourse on the Arts and Sciences by Jean-Jacques Rousseau
- 1751 in literature – Elegy Written in a Country Churchyard – Thomas Gray; Encyclopédie, ou dictionnaire raisonné des sciences, des arts et des métiers – first published
- 1752 in literature – Micromégas – Voltaire. Birth of Fanny Burney
- 1753 in literature – The History of Sir Charles Grandison – Samuel Richardson; The Mistress of the Inn by Carlo Goldoni first performed
- 1754 in literature – The History of Great Britain (to 1762) – David Hume
- 1755 in literature – Letter to Chesterfield – Samuel Johnson; Miss Sara Sampson play by Gotthold Ephraim Lessing
- 1756 in literature – Gilbert White becomes curate of Selborne, Hampshire; Douglas by John Home; An Analysis of the Laws of England by William Blackstone; A Vindication of Natural Society by Edmund Burke; Versuch einer gründlichen Violinschule by Leopold Mozart; The Natural History of Aleppo by Alexander Russell; Essai sur les mœurs et l'esprit des nations by Voltaire
- 1757 in literature – Pierre-Augustin Caron changes his surname to Beaumarchais; A Philosophical Enquiry into the Origin of Our Ideas of the Sublime and Beautiful by Edmund Burke; Harris's List of Covent Garden Ladies by Samuel Derrick; Le Fils naturel by Denis Diderot
- 1758 in literature – Voltaire buys his estate at Ferney; The Idler by Samuel Johnson; Le Père de famille by Denis Diderot
- 1759 in literature – Candide – Voltaire; The Life and Opinions of Tristram Shandy, Gentleman (to 1770) – Laurence Sterne

=== 1760s ===
- 1760 in literature – The Life and Adventures of Sir Launcelot Greaves by Tobias Smollett; Polly Honeycombe by George Colman the Elder; The Boors by Carlo Goldoni; The Minor by Samuel Foote
- 1761 in literature – Julie, ou la nouvelle Héloïse – Jean-Jacques Rousseau
- 1762 in literature – Emile: or, On Education, The Social Contract – Jean-Jacques Rousseau
- 1763 in literature – James Boswell is introduced to Samuel Johnson; A Song to David by Christopher Smart; Three Hundred Tang Poems by Sun Zhu
- 1764 in literature – The Castle of Otranto – Horace Walpole
- 1765 in literature – Beginning of the Sturm und Drang movement; The serial novel The Fool of Quality by Henry Brooke; The History of Little Goody Two-Shoes attributed to Oliver Goldsmith; The Green Bird by Carlo Gozzi; Reliques of Ancient English Poetry by Thomas Percy
- 1766 in literature – The Vicar of Wakefield – Oliver Goldsmith
- 1767 in literature – Minna von Barnhelm – Gotthold Lessing
- 1768 in literature – Poems – Thomas Gray; The Good-Natur'd Man by Oliver Goldsmith; False Delicacy by Hugh Kelly; An Account of Corsica by James Boswell; A Sentimental Journey Through France and Italy by Laurence Sterne
- 1769 in literature – The History of Emily Montague – Frances Brooke; The History and Adventures of an Atom – Tobias Smollett

=== 1770s ===
- 1770 in literature – Épître à l'Auteur du Livre des Trois Imposteurs – Voltaire
- 1771 in literature – Jacques the Fatalist (to 1773) – Denis Diderot. Death of Thomas Gray; Tobias Smollett
- 1772 in literature – Emilia Galotti by Gotthold Ephraim Lessing. The Marquis de Sade embarks on an orgy, as a result of which he is convicted in absentia of sodomy and poisoning and receives a death sentence; he escapes.
- 1773 in literature – Der Messias (from 1748) – Friedrich Gottlieb Klopstock; Jacques the Fatalist and His Master – Denis Diderot
- 1774 in literature – The Sorrows of Young Werther – Johann Wolfgang von Goethe. Death of Oliver Goldsmith
- 1775 in literature – The Rivals – Richard Brinsley Sheridan
- 1776 in literature – Common Sense – Thomas Paine; The Wealth of Nations – Adam Smith; United States Declaration of Independence – Thomas Jefferson
- 1777 in literature – The School for Scandal – Richard Brinsley Sheridan
- 1778 in literature – Evelina – Fanny Burney. Death of Voltaire (b. 1694)
- 1779 in literature – Nathan the Wise – Gotthold Lessing; Fables and Parables – Ignacy Krasicki. Death of David Garrick

=== 1780s ===
- 1780 in literature – Letters to a Philosophical Unbeliever – Joseph Priestley
- 1781 in literature – A Critique of Pure Reason – Immanuel Kant
- 1782 in literature – The Robbers – Friedrich Schiller; Les Liaisons dangereuses – Pierre Choderlos de Laclos. Death of Jean-Jacques Rousseau
- 1783 in literature – Prolegomena to any Future Metaphysics – Immanuel Kant
- 1784 in literature – Barham Downs – Robert Bage; The Marriage of Figaro – Pierre Beaumarchais. Death of Denis Diderot; Samuel Johnson; Phillis Wheatley
- 1785 in literature – 120 Days of Sodom – Marquis de Sade; Groundwork of the Metaphysic of Morals – Immanuel Kant, Anton Reiser (to 1790) – Karl Philipp Moritz; The Task – William Cowper
- 1786 in literature – Poems Chiefly in the Scottish Dialect – Robert Burns; Vathek – William Thomas Beckford
- 1787 in literature – Don Carlos – Friedrich Schiller; Paul et Virginie – Jacques-Henri Bernardin de Saint-Pierre
- 1788 in literature – Memoirs – Saint-Simon; Emmeline, the Orphan of the Castle – Charlotte Turner Smith
- 1789 in literature – Songs of Innocence – William Blake; The History of the Decline and Fall of the Roman Empire – Edward Gibbon – completed

=== 1790s ===
- 1790 in literature – Reflections on the Revolution in France – Edmund Burke; Tam O'Shanter – Robert Burns
- 1791 in literature – Justine – Marquis de Sade; The Life of Samuel Johnson, LL.D. – James Boswell; Dream of the Red Chamber – Cao Xueqin
- 1792 in literature – A Vindication of the Rights of Woman – Mary Wollstonecraft
- 1793 in literature – Songs of Experience – William Blake. Birth of John Neal
- 1794 in literature – The Age of Reason – Thomas Paine. Death of James Boswell
- 1795 in literature – Wilhelm Meister's Apprenticeship (to 1796) – Goethe; The Mysteries of Udolpho – Ann Radcliffe. Death of James Boswell
- 1796 in literature – Camilla – Fanny Burney; Memoirs of My Life and Writings – Edward Gibbon; The Monk – Matthew Lewis. Death of Robert Burns
- 1797 in literature – l'Histoire de Juliette – Marquis de Sade; Kubla Khan – Samuel Taylor Coleridge. Death of Edmund Burke; Horace Walpole; Mary Wollstonecraft
- 1798 in literature – Lyrical Ballads – Samuel Taylor Coleridge and William Wordsworth; The Rime of the Ancient Mariner – Samuel Taylor Coleridge
- 1799 in literature – Arthur Mervyn – Charles Brockden Brown; Wallenstein – Friedrich Schiller
- 1800 in literature – Castle Rackrent – Maria Edgeworth; Hymns to the Night – Novalis; Mary Stuart – Friedrich Schiller; Glenfinlas – Walter Scott

== 19th century ==
=== 1800s ===
- 1801 in literature – Atala – François-René de Chateaubriand; Belinda – Maria Edgeworth
- 1802 in literature – Delphine – Germaine de Staël; René – François-René de Chateaubriand. Birth of Victor Hugo. Death of Lydia Maria Child
- 1803 in literature – St. Clair of the Isles – Elizabeth Helme; Memoirs of Carwin the Biloquist- Charles Brockden Brown; Titan - Jean Paul; Thaddeus of Warsaw - Jane Porter
- 1804 in literature – Jerusalem The Emanation of the Giant Albion (poetry) – William Blake; William Tell – Friedrich Schiller. Death of Immanuel Kant; Joseph Priestley
- 1805 in literature – The Wonder of the Village – Elizabeth Meeke; The Manuscript Found in Saragossa – Jan Potocki; Le Dernier Homme – Jean-Baptiste Cousin de Grainville
- 1806 in literature – Zofloya by Charlotte Dacre - Leonora by Maria Edgeworth - The Wild Irish Girl by Sydney, Lady Morgan
- 1807 in literature – Tales from Shakespeare – Charles Lamb and Mary Lamb
- 1808 in literature – Faust – Goethe; Marmion – Walter Scott
- 1809 in literature – The Martyrs – François-René de Chateaubriand; Elective Affinities – Johann Wolfgang von Goethe. Death of Thomas Paine

=== 1810s ===
- 1810 in literature – The Houses of Osma and Almeria – Regina Maria Roche; Zastrozzi and St. Irvyne – Percy Bysshe Shelley
- 1811 in literature – Sense and Sensibility – Jane Austen; Childe Harold's Pilgrimage – Lord Byron – completed
- 1812 in literature – The Milesian Chief – Charles Maturin; The Swiss Family Robinson – Johann David Wyss; Grimms' Fairy Tales – The Brothers Grimm
- 1813 in literature – Pride and Prejudice – Jane Austen; Queen Mab – Percy Bysshe Shelley
- 1814 in literature – Mansfield Park – Jane Austen; Waverley – Sir Walter Scott; The Dog of Montarges – play by René-Charles Guilbert de Pixérécourt. Death of Marquis de Sade
- 1815 in literature – Emma – Jane Austen; The Pastor's Fireside – Jane Porter; The White Doe of Rylstone – William Wordsworth
- 1816 in literature – Adolphe – Benjamin Constant; The Sandman – E. T. A. Hoffmann; Alastor – Percy Bysshe Shelley
- 1817 in literature – Persuasion – Jane Austen; Northanger Abbey – Jane Austen; Rob Roy – Sir Walter Scott; Harrington and Ormond– Maria Edgeworth. Death of Jane Austen
- 1818 in literature – Frankenstein – Mary Shelley; Julian and Maddalo – Percy Bysshe Shelley; Ozymandias – Percy Bysshe Shelley; The Revolt of Islam – Percy Bysshe Shelley. Death of Matthew Lewis
- 1819 in literature – Ivanhoe – Walter Scott; The Sketch Book – Washington Irving; Ode to a Nightingale – John Keats; Ode to the West Wind – Percy Bysshe Shelley; The Masque of Anarchy – Percy Bysshe Shelley; The Cenci – Percy Bysshe Shelley

=== 1820s ===
- 1820 in literature – Ruslan and Ludmila – Alexander Pushkin; To a Skylark – Percy Bysshe Shelley; The Cloud – Percy Bysshe Shelley; Prometheus Unbound – Percy Bysshe Shelley
- 1821 in literature – Confessions of an English Opium Eater – Thomas De Quincey; Music, When Soft Voices Die – Percy Bysshe Shelley; Adonaïs – Percy Bysshe Shelley
- 1822 in literature – The Vision of Judgment – Lord Byron; Logan – John Neal. Death of Percy Bysshe Shelley
- 1823 in literature – The Pioneers – James Fenimore Cooper; Woe from Wit – Alexander Griboyedov; Twas the Night Before Christmas – Clement Clarke Moore; The Fountain of Bakhchisaray – Alexander Pushkin; Ourika – Claire de Duras; Seventy-Six — John Neal
- 1824 in literature – Our Village – Mary Russell Mitford. Death of Lord Byron
- 1825 in literature – Boris Godunov – Alexander Pushkin; Brother Jonathan – John Neal
- 1826 in literature – The Last of the Mohicans – James Fenimore Cooper; Cinq-Mars – Alfred de Vigny; The Last Man – Mary Shelley; Roger Dodsworth – Mary Shelley
- 1827 in literature – The Betrothed – Alessandro Manzoni; Book of Songs (poetry) – Heinrich Heine; The Mummy! – Jane C. Loudon. Death of William Blake
- 1828 in literature – The Birds of America – John James Audubon; Rachel Dyer – John Neal
- 1829 in literature – The Misfortunes of Elphin – Thomas Love Peacock

=== 1830s ===
- 1830 in literature – The Red and the Black – Stendhal; The Book of Mormon – Joseph Smith
- 1831 in literature – The Hunchback of Notre-Dame – Victor Hugo; La Peau de chagrin – Honoré de Balzac
- 1832 in literature – Eugene Onegin – Alexander Pushkin; Evenings on a Farm Near Dikanka – Nikolai Gogol; The Siege of Malta – Walter Scott; Bizarro – Walter Scott; Vom Kriege – Carl von Clausewitz; Wacousta – John Richardson; Indiana and Valentine – George Sand
- 1833 in literature – Gamiani – Alfred de Musset; Eugene Onegin – Aleksandr Pushkin; Eugénie Grandet – Honoré de Balzac
- 1834 in literature – Sartor Resartus – Thomas Carlyle; Helen – Maria Edgeworth; The Queen of Spades, The Bronze Horseman – Alexander Pushkin; Pan Tadeusz – Adam Mickiewicz
- 1835 in literature – Le Père Goriot – Honoré de Balzac; Taras Bulba – Nikolai Gogol; De la démocratie en Amérique – Alexis de Tocqueville; The Unparalleled Adventure of One Hans Pfaall – Edgar Allan Poe
- 1836 in literature – Máj – Karel Hynek Mácha; The Captain's Daughter – Alexander Pushkin; The Government Inspector and The Nose – Nikolai Gogol
- 1837 in literature – The Little Mermaid – Hans Christian Andersen; The Posthumous Papers of the Pickwick Club – Charles Dickens; La Cautiva – Esteban Echeverría; Death of the Poet – Mikhail Lermontov
- 1838 in literature – Oliver Twist – Charles Dickens; The Birds of America – John James Audubon; The Narrative of Arthur Gordon Pym of Nantucket – Edgar Allan Poe; De Leeuw van Vlaanderen – Hendrik Conscience
- 1839 in literature – The Voyage of the Beagle – Charles Darwin; Nicholas Nickleby – Charles Dickens; The Charterhouse of Parma – Stendhal

=== 1840s ===
- 1840 in literature – A Hero of Our Time – Mikhail Lermontov; Two Years Before the Mast – Richard Henry Dana Jr.; Tales of the Grotesque and Arabesque – Edgar Allan Poe; Kobzar – Taras Hryhorovych Shevchenko; The Arabian Nights – Edward William Lane publishes an English version. Death of Fanny Burney
- 1841 in literature – The Deerslayer – James Fenimore Cooper; Demon – Mikhail Lermontov; The Murders in the Rue Morgue – Edgar Allan Poe; The King of the Golden River – John Ruskin
- 1842 in literature – Dead Souls – Nikolai Gogol
- 1843 in literature – A Christmas Carol – Charles Dickens; Windsor Castle – William Harrison Ainsworth; Either/Or – Søren Kierkegaard; Repetition – Søren Kierkegaard; The Ugly Duckling – Hans Christian Andersen; Critical and Historical Essays – Thomas Babington Macaulay. Death of Robert Southey
- 1844 in literature – The Three Musketeers – Alexandre Dumas, père; The Snow Queen – Hans Christian Andersen
- 1845 in literature – The Count of Monte Cristo – Alexandre Dumas, père; Twenty Years After – Alexandre Dumas, père; La Reine Margot – Alexandre Dumas, père; Stages on Life's Way – Søren Kierkegaard; The Raven – Edgar Allan Poe; Facundo – Domingo Faustino Sarmiento
- 1846 in literature – Cousin Bette – Honoré de Balzac; Poor Folk and The Double – Fyodor Dostoevsky. Birth of Kate Greenaway
- 1847 in literature – The Vicomte de Bragelonne – Alexandre Dumas, père; Agnes Grey – Anne Brontë; The Children of the New Forest – Frederick Marryat; Wuthering Heights – Emily Brontë; Jane Eyre – Charlotte Brontë; Evangeline – Henry Wadsworth Longfellow; Tancred – Benjamin Disraeli
- 1848 in literature – The Tenant of Wildfell Hall – Anne Brontë; Vanity Fair – William Makepeace Thackeray; The Lady of the Camellias – Alexandre Dumas, fils; Yeast – Charles Kingsley; The Communist Manifesto – Karl Marx. Death of François-René de Chateaubriand, Branwell Brontë, Emily Brontë
- 1849 in literature – David Copperfield – Charles Dickens, published as a serial in installments; The Oregon Trail – Francis Parkman; Annabel Lee – Edgar Allan Poe; Shirley – Charlotte Brontë. Birth of August Strindberg. Death of Anne Brontë, Edgar Allan Poe

=== 1850s ===
- 1850 in literature – The Scarlet Letter – Nathaniel Hawthorne; David Copperfield – Charles Dickens, Household Words edited by Charles Dickens begins publication; Christmas-Eve and Easter-Day – Robert Browning. Death of William Wordsworth; Honoré de Balzac
- 1851 in literature – Moby-Dick – Herman Melville; Amalia – José Mármol; Cranford – Elizabeth Gaskell; Lavengro – George Borrow; The House of the Seven Gables – Nathaniel Hawthorne; A Wonder-Book for Girls and Boys – Nathaniel Hawthorne. Death of Mary Shelley; James Fenimore Cooper
- 1852 in literature – Uncle Tom's Cabin – Harriet Beecher Stowe; A Sportsman's Sketches – Ivan Turgenev. Death of Nikolai Gogol
- 1853 in literature – Ruth – Elizabeth Gaskell; Bleak House by Charles Dickens is the first English novel to feature a detective; The Heir of Redclyffe – Charlotte Mary Yonge; The Scholar Gipsy – Matthew Arnold; Bartleby, the Scrivener – Herman Melville; Villette – Charlotte Brontë. Death of Amelia Opie
- 1854 in literature – Walden – Henry David Thoreau; The Newcomes – William Makepeace Thackeray. Death of Gabriele Rossetti; Charlotte Brontë; Søren Kierkegaard
- 1855 in literature – North and South – Elizabeth Gaskell; Babicka (The Grandmother) – Božena Nemcová; Westward Ho! – Charles Kingsley; The Song of Hiawatha – Henry Wadsworth Longfellow; Leaves of Grass – Walt Whitman; A Month in the Country – Ivan Turgenev. Death of Dorothy Wordsworth; Charlotte Brontë
- 1856 in literature – The Daisy Chain – Charlotte Mary Yonge; Aurora Leigh – Elizabeth Barrett Browning; Madame Bovary – Gustave Flaubert; John Halifax, Gentleman – Mrs. Craik. Death of Heinrich Heine
- 1857 in literature – Madame Bovary – Gustave Flaubert; Little Dorrit – Charles Dickens; Les Fleurs du mal – Charles Baudelaire; The Virginians – William Makepeace Thackeray; Tom Brown's Schooldays – Thomas Hughes; The Hasheesh Eater – Fitz Hugh Ludlow; The Professor – Charlotte Brontë
- 1858 in literature – Home of the Gentry – Ivan Turgenev; Phantastes – George MacDonald
- 1859 in literature – A Tale of Two Cities – Charles Dickens; The Ordeal of Richard Feverel – George Meredith; Oblomov – Ivan Goncharov; On the Origin of Species – Charles Darwin; La Légende des siècles – Victor Hugo; The Storm – Aleksandr Ostrovsky; A Bitter Fate – Aleksey Pisemsky. Death of Alexis de Tocqueville; Thomas de Quincey

=== 1860s ===
- 1860 in literature – Max Havelaar – Multatuli; The Mill on the Floss – George Eliot; The Woman in White – Wilkie Collins; First Love – Ivan Turgenev
- 1861 in literature – Silas Marner – George Eliot; Framley Parsonage – Anthony Trollope; Great Expectations – Charles Dickens; East Lynne – Mrs Henry Wood; The Forest of Anykščiai – Antanas Baranauskas. Death of Elizabeth Barrett Browning
- 1862 in literature – Les Misérables – Victor Hugo; Fathers and Sons – Ivan Turgenev; Salammbô – Gustave Flaubert; The House of the Dead – Fyodor Dostoevsky. Death of Henry David Thoreau
- 1863 in literature – Captain Fracasse – Théophile Gautier; Five Weeks in a Balloon- Jules Verne; Aurora Floyd – Mary Elizabeth Braddon; What Is To Be Done? – Nikolay Chernyshevsky; Romola – George Eliot; The Notting Hill Mystery – Charles Warren Adams; Sylvia's Lovers – Elizabeth Gaskell; The House by the Churchyard – Sheridan Le Fanu; Hard Cash – Charles Reade; The Water-Babies, A Fairy Tale for a Land Baby – Charles Kingsley. Death of William Makepeace Thackeray
- 1864 in literature – Uncle Silas – Sheridan Le Fanu; Journey to the Center of the Earth – Jules Verne; Notes from Underground – Fyodor Dostoevsky; María – Jorge Isaacs. Death of Nathaniel Hawthorne, John Clare
- 1865 in literature – Alice's Adventures in Wonderland – Lewis Carroll; Our Mutual Friend – Charles Dickens; From the Earth to the Moon – Jules Verne. Death of Elizabeth Gaskell
- 1866 in literature – Crime and Punishment – Fyodor Dostoevsky; Poems and Ballads – Algernon Charles Swinburne
- 1867 in literature – The Gambler – Fyodor Dostoevsky; Peer Gynt – Henrik Ibsen; Das Kapital – Karl Marx. Death of Charles Baudelaire
- 1868 in literature – Little Women – Louisa May Alcott; The Luck of Roaring Camp – Bret Harte; The Moonstone – Wilkie Collins; Enough Stupidity in Every Wise Man – Aleksandr Ostrovsky
- 1869 in literature – War and Peace – Leo Tolstoy; L'Education Sentimentale – Gustave Flaubert; Les Chants de Maldoror – Comte de Lautréamont; Lorna Doone – R. D. Blackmore; The Idiot – Fyodor Dostoevsky; The Brick Moon – Edward Everett Hale; The Man Who Laughs – Victor Hugo

=== 1870s ===
- 1870 in literature – Twenty Thousand Leagues Under the Seas – Jules Verne; Venus in Furs – Leopold von Sacher-Masoch; Lothair – Benjamin Disraeli. Death of Charles Dickens
- 1871 in literature – Middlemarch – George Eliot; The Slaughter Yard – Esteban Echeverría; Through the Looking-Glass – Lewis Carroll; Le bateau ivre – Arthur Rimbaud; The Coming Race – Edward Bulwer-Lytton. Death of Alice Cary; Phoebe Cary
- 1872 in literature – The Birth of Tragedy – Friedrich Nietzsche; In a Glass Darkly – Sheridan Le Fanu; The Princess and the Goblin – George MacDonald; Erewhon – Samuel Butler – José Hernández's Martín Fierro; Demons – Fyodor Dostoevsky
- 1873 in literature – Around the World in 80 Days – Jules Verne; The Poison Tree – Bankim Chatterjee; Red Cotton Night-Cap Country – Robert Browning. Death of John Stuart Mill
- 1874 in literature – Les Diaboliques – Jules Amédée Barbey d'Aurevilly; Far from the Madding Crowd – Thomas Hardy
- 1875 in literature – The Way We Live Now – Anthony Trollope; Beauchamp's Career – George Meredith. Death of Hans Christian Andersen
- 1876 in literature – The Adventures of Tom Sawyer – Mark Twain; The Shadow of the Sword – Robert Buchanan; The Story of Sigurd the Volsung and the Fall of the Niblungs – William Morris; An Ancient Tale – Józef Ignacy Kraszewski. Death of John Neal; George Sand
- 1877 in literature – Under the Lilacs – Louisa May Alcott; Anna Karenina – Leo Tolstoy; L'Assommoir – Émile Zola; Black Beauty – Anna Sewell; Povídky malostranské ("Tales of the Lesser Quarter") – Jan Neruda
- 1878 in literature – H.M.S. Pinafore – Gilbert and Sullivan; Daisy Miller – Henry James. Death of Anna Sewell
- 1879 in literature – The Red Room – August Strindberg; A Doll's House – Henrik Ibsen

=== 1880s ===
- 1880 in literature – Juan Moreira – Eduardo Gutiérrez; Ben-Hur – Lew Wallace; Workers in the Dawn – George Gissing; Nana – Émile Zola; The Brothers Karamazov – Fyodor Dostoevsky. Birth of Andrei Bely
- 1881 in literature – The Portrait of a Lady – Henry James; Uncle Remus: His Songs and His Sayings – Joel Chandler Harris; The Black Robe – Wilkie Collins; Ghosts – Henrik Ibsen. Death of Fyodor Dostoevsky; Thomas Carlyle; Benjamin Disraeli
- 1882 in literature – The Prince and the Pauper – Mark Twain; The Naval War of 1812 – Theodore Roosevelt
- 1883 in literature – Treasure Island – Robert Louis Stevenson; The Adventures of Pinocchio – Carlo Collodi; The Merry Adventures of Robin Hood – Howard Pyle. Death of Karl Marx;
- 1884 in literature – Miss Bretherton – Mary Augusta Ward; The Adventures of Huckleberry Finn – Mark Twain; With Fire and Sword – Henryk Sienkiewicz; The Wild Duck – Henrik Ibsen; Flatland – Edwin Abbott Abbott
- 1885 in literature – King Solomon's Mines – Henry Rider Haggard; Marius the Epicurean – Walter Pater; Alfred, Lord Tennyson completes Idylls of the King; Germinal – Émile Zola; George A. Moore – A Mummer's Wife; The Mikado – Gilbert and Sullivan; Bel Ami – Guy de Maupassant. Death of Victor Hugo; Ivan Turgenev; Sojourner Truth
- 1886 in literature – L'Œuvre (The Masterpiece) – Émile Zola; Little Lord Fauntleroy – Frances Hodgson Burnett; Dr. Jekyll and Mr. Hyde – Robert Louis Stevenson; The Outpost – Boleslaw Prus; The Bostonians – Henry James; The Death of Ivan Ilyich – Leo Tolstoy; Rosmersholm – Henrik Ibsen; A Romance of Two Worlds – Marie Corelli. Death of Emily Dickinson
- 1887 in literature – She – Henry Rider Haggard; A Study in Scarlet – Arthur Conan Doyle (first Sherlock Holmes novel); Thelma – Marie Corelli; The Father – August Strindberg; Noli me tangere – José Rizal
- 1888 in literature – The Man Who Would Be King – Rudyard Kipling; Looking Backward – Edward Bellamy; Robert Elsmere – Mary Augusta Ward; Miss Julie – August Strindberg. Death of Louisa May Alcott; Matthew Arnold
- 1889 in literature – Thus Spoke Zarathustra – Friedrich Nietzsche; The Doll – Boleslaw Prus; The Child of Pleasure – Gabriele d'Annunzio; Three Men in a Boat – Jerome K. Jerome; A Connecticut Yankee in King Arthur's Court – Mark Twain; The Kreutzer Sonata – Leo Tolstoy. Death of Gerard Manley Hopkins; Wilkie Collins; Robert Browning

=== 1890s ===
- 1890 in literature – Hedda Gabler – Henrik Ibsen; Hunger – Knut Hamsun; Original German performance of Spring Awakening - Frank Wedekind; An Occurrence at Owl Creek Bridge – Ambrose Bierce;
- 1891 in literature – Tales of Soldiers and Civilians – Ambrose Bierce; Diary of a Pilgrimage – Jerome K. Jerome; Tess of the d'Urbervilles – Thomas Hardy; The Picture of Dorian Gray – Oscar Wilde. Death of Herman Melville, Arthur Rimbaud
- 1892 in literature – The Adventures of Sherlock Holmes – Arthur Conan Doyle; Children of the Ghetto – Israel Zangwill; Gunga Din – Rudyard Kipling; Chitra – Rabindranath Tagore. Death of Walt Whitman
- 1893 in literature – The New Woman – Boleslaw Prus. Death of Guy de Maupassant
- 1894 in literature – The Jungle Book – Rudyard Kipling; The Prisoner of Zenda – Anthony Hope; Pan – Knut Hamsun; The Great God Pan – Arthur Machen; Studies of Death: Romantic Tales – Eric Stenbock; Land of the Changing Sun – Will Harben. Death of Robert Louis Stevenson, Christina Rossetti
- 1895 in literature – The Time Machine – H. G. Wells; Almayer's Folly – Joseph Conrad; Pharaoh – Boleslaw Prus; Jude the Obscure – Thomas Hardy; The Three Impostors – Arthur Machen; Quo Vadis – Henryk Sienkiewicz; The Importance of Being Earnest – Oscar Wilde. Death of Frederick Douglass, Alexandre Dumas, fils
- 1896 in literature – The Island of Doctor Moreau – H. G. Wells; The Well at the World's End – William Morris; Shapes in the Fire – M.P. Shiel; The Seagull – Anton Chekhov; Inferno – August Strindberg. Death of Harriet Beecher Stowe, Paul Verlaine
- 1897 in literature – Captains Courageous – Rudyard Kipling; Uncle Vanya – Anton Chekhov; Dracula – Bram Stoker; Divagations – Stéphane Mallarmé; The Beetle – Richard Marsh; The Invisible Man – H. G. Wells. Death of Harriet Jacobs
- 1898 in literature – Paris – Émile Zola; The War of the Worlds – H. G. Wells; The Turn of the Screw – Henry James; To Damascus – August Strindberg. Death of Lewis Carroll, Stéphane Mallarmé
- 1899 in literature – The School and Society – John Dewey; The Lady with the Dog – Anton Chekhov; The Awakening – Kate Chopin; Heart of Darkness – Joseph Conrad; The Yellow Wallpaper – Charlotte Perkins Gilman; The Interpretation of Dreams – Sigmund Freud; When We Dead Awaken – Henrik Ibsen. First printed edition of Alpamysh; Dom Casmurro – Machado de Assis
- 1900 in literature – L. Frank Baum's The Wonderful Wizard of Oz; Joseph Conrad's Lord Jim; Theodore Dreiser's Sister Carrie. Death of Oscar Wilde

== 20th century ==
=== 1900s ===
- 1901 in literature – Thomas Mann's Buddenbrooks; M. P. Shiel's The Purple Cloud; Anton Chekhov's Three Sisters; Rudyard Kipling's Kim; August Strindberg's A Dream Play; Stanislaw Wyspianski's The Wedding. Death of Kate Greenaway, Charlotte Mary Yonge
- 1902 in literature – André Gide's The Immoralist; Maxim Gorky's The Lower Depths; Henry James's The Wings of the Dove; Arthur Conan Doyle's The Hound of the Baskervilles; Beatrix Potter's The Tale of Peter Rabbit; J. M. Barrie's The Little White Bird; Leo Tolstoy's The Power of Darkness. Death of Émile Zola, Bret Harte
- 1903 in literature – Henry James's The Ambassadors; Jack London's The Call of the Wild; W. E. B. Du Bois's The Souls of Black Folk; Bram Stoker's The Jewel of Seven Stars. Death of George Gissing, W. E. Henley
- 1904 in literature – Joseph Conrad's Nostromo; E. M. Forster's Where Angels Fear to Tread; Henry James's The Golden Bowl; M. R. James's Ghost Stories of an Antiquary; Jack London's The Sea-Wolf; William Henry Hudson's Green Mansions; Władysław Reymont's The Peasants; Anton Chekhov's play The Cherry Orchard first performed. Death of Anton Chekhov
- 1905 in literature – Leopoldo Lugones' La Guerra Gaucha; Jack London's White Fang; Arthur Conan Doyle's The Return of Sherlock Holmes; Edith Nesbit's The Railway Children, Rokeya Sakhawat Hussain's Sultana's Dream; Baroness Orczy's The Scarlet Pimpernel. Death of Jules Verne
- 1906 in literature – Leopoldo Lugones' Strange Forces; Alfred Noyes' The Highwayman; Maxim Gorky's The Mother; Upton Sinclair's The Jungle; Lope K. Santos' Banaag at Sikat. Death of Paul Laurence Dunbar, Henrik Ibsen
- 1907 in literature – Arnold Bennett's The City of Pleasure; Selma Lagerlöf's The Wonderful Adventures of Nils; Robert Hugh Benson's Lord of the World; August Strindberg's The Ghost Sonata; Pedro Alcantara Monteclaro's Maragtas. Death of Alfred Jarry, Sully Prudhomme
- 1908 in literature – Leonid Andreyev's The Seven Who Were Hanged; E. M. Forster's A Room with a View; Lucy Maud Montgomery's Anne of Green Gables; Anatole France's L'île des Pingouins (Penguin Island); Kenneth Grahame's The Wind in the Willows; Baroness Orczy's The Elusive Pimpernel; Colette's The Tendrils of the Vine. Death of Joel Chandler Harris, Machado de Assis
- 1909 in literature – Hermann Sudermann's The Song of Songs; H. G. Wells' Tono-Bungay. Death of John Millington Synge, Algernon Charles Swinburne

=== 1910s ===
- 1910 in literature – E. M. Forster's Howards End; Hanns Heinz Ewers's The Sorcerer's Apprentice; Rabindranath Tagore's Raja. Death of Leo Tolstoy, Mark Twain
- 1911 in literature – Joseph Conrad's Under Western Eyes; Gaston Leroux's The Phantom of the Opera; Frances Hodgson Burnett's The Secret Garden; Ambrose Bierce's The Devil's Dictionary; Edith Wharton's Ethan Frome; Hugo Gernsback's Ralph 124C 41+; Encyclopædia Britannica Eleventh Edition published. Death of Joseph Pulitzer
- 1912 in literature – Thomas Mann's Death in Venice; Edgar Rice Burroughs's Tarzan of the Apes; Arthur Conan Doyle's The Lost World. Death of Bram Stoker
- 1913 in literature – Andrei Bely's Petersburg; Alain-Fournier's Le Grand Meaulnes; D. H. Lawrence's Sons and Lovers; George Bernard Shaw's Pygmalion; Edgar Rice Burroughs's The Return of Tarzan; Guillaume Apollinaire's Alcools
- 1914 in literature – Heinrich Mann's The Loyal Subject; Stephen Leacock's Arcadian Adventures with the Idle Rich; James Joyce's Dubliners. Disappearance of Ambrose Bierce in Mexico
- 1915 in literature – Franz Kafka's The Metamorphosis; Charlotte Perkins Gilman's Herland; Russell Thorndike's Doctor Syn: A Tale of the Romney Marsh. Death of Rupert Brooke
- 1916 in literature – Albert Einstein's Relativity; W. H. Davies' Leisure; James Joyce's A Portrait of the Artist as a Young Man. Death of Henry James, Jack London
- 1917 in literature – T. S. Eliot's The Love Song of J. Alfred Prufrock; Aleister Crowley's Moonchild; Edgar Rice Burroughs's A Princess of Mars
- 1918 in literature – Booth Tarkington's The Magnificent Ambersons; Thomas Mann's Reflections of a Nonpolitical Man; Alexander Blok's The Twelve; Lytton Strachey's Eminent Victorians; Norman Lindsay's The Magic Pudding; Jack London's The Red One. Death of Wilfred Owen
- 1919 in literature – W. Somerset Maugham's The Moon and Sixpence; Johnston McCulley's The Curse of Capistrano; H. P. Lovecraft's Dagon; Daisy Ashford's The Young Visiters. Death of Rosa Luxemburg, L. Frank Baum, Andrew Carnegie.

=== 1920s ===
- 1920 in literature – F. Scott Fitzgerald's This Side of Paradise; D. H. Lawrence's Women in Love; Sinclair Lewis's Main Street; Edith Wharton's The Age of Innocence; Hugh Lofting's The Story of Doctor Dolittle; Yevgeny Zamyatin's We; Sigmund Freud's Beyond the Pleasure Principle; Karel Capek's R.U.R.; Agatha Christie's The Mysterious Affair at Styles; H. P. Lovecraft's The Cats of Ulthar. Death of William Heinemann, Olive Schreiner
- 1921 in literature – Luigi Pirandello's play, Six Characters in Search of an Author; Langston Hughes's poem "The Negro Speaks of Rivers" in The Crisis. Death of Alexander Blok
- 1922 in literature – James Joyce's Ulysses; T. S. Eliot's The Waste Land; Hermann Hesse's Siddhartha; E. R. Eddison's The Worm Ouroboros; Rainer Maria Rilke's Duino Elegies and Sonnets to Orpheus; Karel Capek's The Makropulos Affair; John Galsworthy begins writing The Forsyte Saga; Agatha Christie's The Secret Adversary. Death of Marcel Proust (In Search of Lost Time completed)
- 1923 in literature – Kahlil Gibran's The Prophet; Dorothy L. Sayers' Whose Body? (Lord Peter Wimsey makes his first appearance in print); Jaroslav Hašek's The Good Soldier Švejk; Agatha Christie's The Murder on the Links. Death of Katherine Mansfield
- 1924 in literature – Yevgeny Zamyatin's We; Thomas Mann's Der Zauberberg (The Magic Mountain); E. M. Forster's A Passage to India; Herman Melville's Billy Budd, Foretopman; Lord Dunsany's The King of Elfland's Daughter; José Eustasio Rivera's The Vortex; Agatha Christie's The Man in the Brown Suit and Poirot Investigates. Death of Franz Kafka, Joseph Conrad, Marie Corelli, Anatole France, Frances Hodgson Burnett
- 1925 in literature – F. Scott Fitzgerald's The Great Gatsby; W. Somerset Maugham's The Painted Veil; Virginia Woolf's Mrs. Dalloway; Franz Kafka's Der Prozeß (The Trial); Adolf Hitler's Mein Kampf; Mikhail Bulgakov's Heart of a Dog; André Gide's The Counterfeiters; John Dos Passos's Manhattan Transfer; Agatha Christie's The Secret of Chimneys. Death of Sergey Esenin, Amy Lowell
- 1926 in literature – Roberto Arlt's Mad Toy; A. A. Milne's Winnie-the-Pooh; Ernest Hemingway's The Sun Also Rises; Sean O'Casey's play The Plough and the Stars; Franz Kafka's Das Schloß (The Castle); Agatha Christie's The Murder of Roger Ackroyd; Ricardo Güiraldes' Don Segundo Sombra. Death of J. M. Dent, Rudolf Christoph Eucken, Rainer Maria Rilke
- 1927 in literature – Final instalment of Marcel Proust's In Search of Lost Time; Hermann Hesse's Steppenwolf; Virginia Woolf's To the Lighthouse; Arthur Conan Doyle's The Case-Book of Sherlock Holmes; Sinclair Lewis's Elmer Gantry; Yuri Olesha's Envy; Sigrid Undset's The Snake Pit; Martin Heidegger's Being and Time; Thornton Wilder's The Bridge of San Luis Rey; Agatha Christie's The Big Four; François Mauriac's Thérèse Desqueyroux; H. P. Lovecraft's The Colour Out of Space. Death of Jerome K. Jerome
- 1928 in literature – D. H. Lawrence's Lady Chatterley's Lover; Siegfried Sassoon's Memoirs of a Fox-Hunting Man; Bertholt Brecht's The Threepenny Opera; Ilf and Petrov's The Twelve Chairs; Federico Garcia Lorca's Gypsy Ballads; Agatha Christie's The Mystery of the Blue Train; Andrei Platonov's Chevengur; Valerian Pidmohylny's The City. Death of Thomas Hardy
- 1929 in literature – William Faulkner's The Sound and the Fury; Ernest Hemingway's A Farewell to Arms; Alfred Döblin's Berlin Alexanderplatz; Erich Maria Remarque's All Quiet on the Western Front; Robert Graves's Goodbye to All That; John Cowper Powys's Wolf Solent; Rómulo Gallegos' Doña Bárbara; Agatha Christie's The Seven Dials Mystery and Partners in Crime; Virginia Woolf's A Room of One's Own. Death of Mary MacLane. Establishment of Faber and Faber

=== 1930s ===
- 1930 in literature – William Faulkner's As I Lay Dying; Dashiell Hammett's The Maltese Falcon; Andrei Platonov's The Foundation Pit; Carolyn Keene's The Secret of the Old Clock (first in the Nancy Drew stories); Vladimir Nabokov's The Defence; Olaf Stapledon's Last and First Men; Luigi Pirandello's The Man With the Flower in His Mouth becomes the first broadcast television drama; Sigmund Freud's Civilization and Its Discontents; Agatha Christie's The Murder at the Vicarage, Giant's Bread, and The Mysterious Mr Quin. Death of D. H. Lawrence, Robert Bridges
- 1931 in literature – Roberto Arlt's The Flamethrowers; Ilf and Petrov's The Little Golden Calf; Pearl S. Buck's The Good Earth; Georges Simenon's The Strange Case of Peter the Lett (first Jules Maigret novel); Agatha Christie's The Sittaford Mystery; The Floating Admiral (collaborative novel by 13 writers of the Detection Club: Victor Whitechurch, G. D. H. Cole and Margaret Cole, Henry Wade, Agatha Christie, John Rhode, Milward Kennedy, Dorothy L. Sayers, Ronald Knox, Freeman Wills Crofts, Edgar Jepson, Clemence Dane and Anthony Berkeley. Prologue written by G. K. Chesterton.); H. P. Lovecraft's The Whisperer in Darkness. Death of Arnold Bennett, Erik Axel Karlfeldt, Khalil Gibran
- 1932 in literature – Aldous Huxley's Brave New World; Louis-Ferdinand Céline's Voyage au Bout de la Nuit (Journey to the End of the Night); Hermann Hesse's Journey to the East; William Faulkner's Light in August; Lewis Grassic Gibbon's Sunset Song; Agatha Christie's Peril at End House and The Thirteen Problems. Death of Lytton Strachey, Hart Crane, Sol Plaatje
- 1933 in literature – André Malraux's La Condition Humaine (Man's Fate); Gertrude Stein's The Autobiography of Alice B. Toklas; James Hilton's Lost Horizon; Vera Brittain's Testament of Youth; John Cowper Powys A Glastonbury Romance; Eugene O'Neill's Ah, Wilderness!; Agatha Christie's Lord Edgware Dies and The Hound of Death; Lao She's Cat Country; Lion Feuchtwanger's The Oppermanns. Death of John Galsworthy, Ring Lardner, George Moore
- 1934 in literature – F. Scott Fitzgerald's Tender Is the Night; Robert Graves's I, Claudius; Henry Miller's Tropic of Cancer; Agatha Christie's Murder on the Orient Express, Unfinished Portrait, Why Didn't They Ask Evans?, Three Act Tragedy, The Listerdale Mystery, and Parker Pyne Investigates; Irving Stone's Lust for Life; P.L. Travers' Mary Poppins; Dashiell Hammett's The Thin Man; James Hilton's Goodbye, Mr. Chips; Nikolai Ostrovsky's How the Steel Was Tempered; James M. Cain's The Postman Always Rings Twice; H. P. Lovecraft completes Supernatural Horror in Literature (1925–34); E. E. Smith's Triplanetary. Death of Andrei Bely, Wallace Thurman
- 1935 in literature – Jorge Luis Borges' A Universal History of Infamy; Laura Ingalls Wilder's Little House on the Prairie; Russell Thorndike's Doctor Syn Returns; Agatha Christie's Death in the Clouds. First paperback published by Penguin Books. Death of Charlotte Perkins Gilman, T. E. Lawrence, Fernando Pessoa
- 1936 in literature – William Faulkner's Absalom, Absalom!; Margaret Mitchell's Gone with the Wind; Daphne du Maurier's Jamaica Inn; First issue of Life magazine; John Dos Passos's U.S.A. trilogy; Karel Capek's War with the Newts; Munro Leaf's The Story of Ferdinand; Russell Thorndike's Doctor Syn on the High Seas and Further Adventures of Doctor Syn; Agatha Christie's The A.B.C. Murders, Murder in Mesopotamia, and Cards on the Table; Maxim Gorky's The Life of Klim Samgin; H. P. Lovecraft's At the Mountains of Madness, The Shadow Over Innsmouth and The Shadow Out of Time. Killing of Federico García Lorca, death of Maxim Gorky
- 1937 in literature – John Steinbeck's Of Mice and Men; J. R. R. Tolkien's The Hobbit, or There and Back Again; Georges Bernanos's Journal d'un Curé de Campagne (The Diary of a Country Priest); Olaf Stapledon's Star Maker; Lao She's Rickshaw Boy; Agatha Christie's Dumb Witness, Death on the Nile, and Murder in the Mews. Death of H. P. Lovecraft, John Drinkwater, Antonio Gramsci, J. M. Barrie, Edith Wharton
- 1938 in literature – Jean-Paul Sartre's La Nausée; Graham Greene's Brighton Rock; Evelyn Waugh's Scoop; Henry Miller's Tropic of Capricorn; T. H. White's The Sword in the Stone; Vladimir Bartol's Alamut; C. L. R. James's The Black Jacobins, Agatha Christie's Appointment with Death and Hercule Poirot's Christmas. Death of Karel Čapek, James Weldon Johnson, Osip Mandelstam, Thomas Wolfe
- 1939 in literature – James Joyce's Finnegans Wake; Konstantine Gamsakhurdia's The Right Hand of the Grand Master; John Steinbeck's The Grapes of Wrath; Robert L. May's Rudolph the Red-Nosed Reindeer; Raymond Chandler's The Big Sleep; Flora Thompson's Lark Rise; T. S. Eliot's Old Possum's Book of Practical Cats; Ludwig Bemelmans's Madeline; Nathanael West's The Day of the Locust; Richard Llewellyn's How Green Was My Valley; Russell Thorndike's Courageous Exploits of Doctor Syn; Agatha Christie's Murder Is Easy, And Then There Were None, and The Regatta Mystery; Nathalie Sarraute's Tropisms; Stefan Zweig's Beware of Pity. Death of Sigmund Freud, W. B. Yeats

=== 1940s ===
- 1940 in literature – Anna Akhmatova's Requiem; Arthur Koestler's Darkness at Noon; Graham Greene's The Power and the Glory; Ernest Hemingway's For Whom the Bell Tolls; Eric Knight's Lassie Come-Home; Carson McCullers's The Heart Is a Lonely Hunter; Richard Wright's Native Son; Olaf Stapledon's Sirius; John Cowper Powys's Owen Glendower; Agatha Christie's Sad Cypress and One, Two, Buckle My Shoe; Adolfo Bioy Casares's The Invention of Morel; Mikhail Sholokhov's And Quiet Flows the Don. Death of F. Scott Fitzgerald
- 1941 in literature – Jorge Luis Borges' The Garden of Forking Paths; Virginia Woolf's Between the Acts; Margret and H.A. Rey's Curious George; Agatha Christie's Evil Under the Sun and N or M?; H. P. Lovecraft's The Case of Charles Dexter Ward. Death of James Joyce, Virginia Woolf
- 1942 in literature – Albert Camus's Le Mythe de Sisyphe (The Myth of Sisyphus) and L'Étranger (The Stranger); Edith Hamilton's Mythology; Enid Blyton's The Famous Five; Robert Musil's The Man Without Qualities; Agatha Christie's The Body in the Library, Five Little Pigs. and The Moving Finger. Death of Stefan Zweig
- 1943 in literature – Jean-Paul Sartre's Anti-Semite and Jew and Being and Nothingness; Ayn Rand's The Fountainhead; T. S. Eliot's Four Quartets published together for the first time; Hermann Hesse's Das Glasperlenspiel (The Glass Bead Game); Antoine de Saint-Exupéry's The Little Prince; Jean Genet's Our Lady of the Flowers; Colette's Gigi; H. P. Lovecraft's The Dream-Quest of Unknown Kadath. Death of Beatrix Potter
- 1944 in literature – Jorge Luis Borges's Ficciones; Jean-Paul Sartre's No Exit; Ivan Bunin's Dark Avenues; Jean Genet's Our Lady of the Flowers; John Hersey's A Bell for Adano; Tennessee Williams's The Glass Menagerie; Russell Thorndike's The Shadow of Doctor Syn; Agatha Christie's Towards Zero, Absent in the Spring, and Death Comes as the End. Death of Jean Giraudoux, Arthur Quiller-Couch, Antoine de Saint-Exupéry
- 1945 in literature – George Orwell's Animal Farm; Bertrand Russell's A History of Western Philosophy And Its Connection with Political and Social Circumstances from the Earliest Times to the Present Day; Astrid Lindgren's Pippi Longstocking; The Rev W. Awdry's The Railway Series, Evelyn Waugh's Brideshead Revisited; Flora Thompson's Lark Rise to Candleford; John Steinbeck's Cannery Row; Agatha Christie's Sparkling Cyanide; Tove Jansson's The Moomins; Aleksandr Solzhenitsyn sentenced to eight years in a labour camp for criticism of Joseph Stalin. Death of Paul Valéry, Theodore Dreiser
- 1946 in literature – Eugene O'Neill's The Iceman Cometh; Nikos Kazantzakis's Zorba the Greek; George Orwell's Critical Essays; E. E. Smith's The Skylark of Space; Agatha Christie's The Hollow; Mervyn Peake's Titus Groan. Death of Countee Cullen, H. G. Wells
- 1947 in literature – Anne Frank's The Diary of a Young Girl; Thomas Mann's Doctor Faustus; Albert Camus's La Peste; Tennessee Williams's A Streetcar Named Desire; Boris Vian's Froth on the Daydream and Autumn in Peking; Malcolm Lowry's Under the Volcano; Jean Genet's Querelle of Brest and The Maids; Arthur Miller's All My Sons; Agatha Christie's The Labours of Hercules; 1st Tony Awards are awarded. Death of Hugh Lofting, Manuel Machado, Maxwell Perkins
- 1948 in literature – Ernesto Sábato's The Tunnel; Leopoldo Marechal's Adam Buenosayres; Graham Greene's The Heart of the Matter; Norman Mailer's The Naked and the Dead; Agatha Christie's Taken at the Flood, The Rose and the Yew Tree, and The Witness for the Prosecution and Other Stories; Dazai Osamu's No Longer Human. Death of Zelda Fitzgerald, Claude McKay
- 1949 in literature – Jorge Luis Borges' The Aleph and Other Stories; George Orwell's Nineteen Eighty-Four; Arthur Miller's Death of a Salesman; Enid Blyton's Noddy Goes to Toyland; Jean Genet's The Thief's Journal; Vilhelm Moberg's The Emigrants; Agatha Christie's Crooked House; Simone de Beauvoir's The Second Sex; Yukio Mishima's Confessions of a Mask. Death of Maurice Maeterlinck, Sigrid Undset, Hallie Quinn Brown

=== 1950s ===
- 1950 in literature – Ray Bradbury's The Martian Chronicles; Eugène Ionesco's The Bald Soprano; C. S. Lewis's The Lion, the Witch and the Wardrobe; Isaac Asimov's I, Robot; Agatha Christie's A Murder Is Announced and Three Blind Mice and Other Stories; Mervyn Peake's Gormenghast; Pablo Neruda's Canto General. Death of George Orwell, George Bernard Shaw
- 1951 in literature – Jorge Luis Borges' Death and the Compass; Julio Cortázar's Bestiario; J. D. Salinger's The Catcher in the Rye; Graham Greene's The End of the Affair; Marguerite Yourcenar's Memoirs of Hadrian; John Cowper Powys's Porius: A Romance of the Dark Ages; Samuel Beckett's Molloy and Malone Dies; Isaac Asimov's Foundation; Agatha Christie's They Came to Baghdad and The Under Dog and Other Stories; Kalki Krishnamurty's Ponniyin Selvan. Death of Sinclair Lewis, André Gide
- 1952 in literature – Ernest Hemingway's The Old Man and the Sea; E. B. White's Charlotte's Web; Ralph Ellison's Invisible Man; Mary Norton's The Borrowers; Flannery O'Connor's Wise Blood; Agatha Christie's Mrs McGinty's Dead, They Do It with Mirrors, The Mousetrap and A Daughter's a Daughter. Death of Knut Hamsun
- 1953 in literature – Samuel Beckett's Waiting for Godot and The Unnamable; Ian Fleming's Casino Royale (First James Bond novel); Saul Bellow's The Adventures of Augie March; Ray Bradbury's Fahrenheit 451; L. P. Hartley's The Go-Between; George Lamming's In the Castle of My Skin; Leon Uris's Battle Cry; Arthur Miller's play The Crucible first performed; J. D. Salinger's Nine Stories; Agatha Christie's After the Funeral and A Pocket Full of Rye. Death of Hilaire Belloc, Dylan Thomas, Eugene O'Neill
- 1954 in literature – J. R. R. Tolkien's The Lord of the Rings; William Golding's Lord of the Flies; Aldous Huxley's The Doors of Perception; Kingsley Amis's Lucky Jim; Christy Brown's My Left Foot; William Soutar's Diaries of a Dying Man; Françoise Sagan's Bonjour tristesse; Dr. Seuss' Horton Hears a Who!; Winston Churchill's The Second World War – completed; Agatha Christie's Destination Unknown. Death of Colette
- 1955 in literature – Juan Rulfo's Pedro Páramo; Vladimir Nabokov's Lolita; Tennessee Williams's Cat on a Hot Tin Roof; Beverly Cleary's Beezus and Ramona; Patricia Highsmith's The Talented Mr. Ripley; Flannery O'Connor's A Good Man Is Hard to Find; Arthur Miller's A View from the Bridge; Alistair MacLean's HMS Ulysses; Agatha Christie's Hickory Dickory Dock. Death of Thomas Mann, Dale Carnegie
- 1956 in literature – Julio Cortázar's End of the Game; Grace Metalious's Peyton Place; Friedrich Dürrenmatt's The Visit; Eugene O'Neill's Long Day's Journey into Night; Allen Ginsberg's Howl and Other Poems; Fred Gipson's Old Yeller; Agatha Christie's Dead Man's Folly and The Burden. Death of H. L. Mencken, Walter de la Mare
- 1957 in literature – Jack Kerouac's On the Road; Ayn Rand's Atlas Shrugged; Vladimir Nabokov's Pnin; Rodolfo Walsh's Operación Masacre;Patrick White's Voss; Ted Hughes's The Hawk in the Rain, John Cheever's The Wapshot Chronicle; Boris Pasternak's Doctor Zhivago; Dr. Seuss' The Cat in the Hat and How the Grinch Stole Christmas!; Max Frisch's Homo Faber; Tennessee Williams' Orpheus Descending; Jean Genet's The Balcony; Harold Pinter's The Birthday Party; Harold Pinter's The Room; Robert A. Heinlein's The Door into Summer; Agatha Christie's 4:50 from Paddington. Death of Oliver St. John Gogarty, Giuseppe Tomasi di Lampedusa
- 1958 in literature – Chinua Achebe's Things Fall Apart; Brendan Behan's Borstal Boy; Giuseppe Tomasi di Lampedusa's Il Gattopardo (The Leopard); Leon Uris's Exodus; Terry Southern's Candy; Jack Kerouac's The Dharma Bums; Michael Bond's A Bear Called Paddington; R. K. Narayan's The Guide; Harold Pinter's play The Birthday Party first performed; Jean Genet's The Blacks; Josef Skvorecky's The Cowards; Agatha Christie's Ordeal by Innocence. Death of Cyril M. Kornbluth, Juan Ramón Jiménez, Roger Martin du Gard
- 1959 in literature – Julio Cortázar's The Secret Weapons; William S. Burroughs's Naked Lunch; Günter Grass's The Tin Drum; Heinrich Böll's Billiards at Half-past Nine; Eugène Ionesco's Rhinocéros (Rhinoceros); André Schwarz-Bart's The Last of the Just; Terry Southern's The Magic Christian; Alain Robbe-Grillet's In the Labyrinth; Walter M. Miller Jr.'s A Canticle for Leibowitz; Tennessee Williams' Sweet Bird of Youth; John Arden's Serjeant Musgrave's Dance; Raymond Queneau's Zazie in the Metro; Agatha Christie's Cat Among the Pigeons; Mervyn Peake's Titus Alone. Death of Edwin Muir, Raymond Chandler

=== 1960s ===
- 1960 in literature – Julio Cortázar's The Winners; William L. Shirer's The Rise and Fall of the Third Reich; Harper Lee's To Kill a Mockingbird; Dr. Seuss' One Fish, Two Fish, Red Fish, Blue Fish and Green Eggs and Ham; Edna O'Brien's The Country Girls; John Updike's Rabbit, Run; Agatha Christie's The Adventure of the Christmas Pudding. Death of Albert Camus, Boris Pasternak, Nevil Shute, Richard Wright. Lady Chatterley trial
- 1961 in literature – Ernesto Sábato's On Heroes and Tombs; Joseph Heller's Catch-22; V. S. Naipaul's A House for Mr Biswas; Richard Yates's Revolutionary Road; Walker Percy's The Moviegoer; Muriel Spark's The Prime of Miss Jean Brodie; Norton Juster's The Phantom Tollbooth; Robert A. Heinlein's Stranger in a Strange Land; Stanislaw Lem's Solaris; J. D. Salinger's Franny and Zooey; Jean Genet's The Screens; Roald Dahl's James and the Giant Peach; Agatha Christie's The Pale Horse and Double Sin and Other Stories. Death of Ernest Hemingway, Frantz Fanon, Dashiell Hammett, James Thurber
- 1962 in literature – Julio Cortázar's Cronopios and Famas; Ken Kesey's One Flew Over the Cuckoo's Nest; Anthony Burgess's A Clockwork Orange, Vladimir Nabokov's Pale Fire; Aleksandr Solzhenitsyn's One Day in the Life of Ivan Denisovich; Doris Lessing's The Golden Notebook; Jorge Luis Borges's Labyrinths; Philip K. Dick's The Man in the High Castle; Carlos Fuentes's The Death of Artemio Cruz; Madeleine L'Engle's A Wrinkle in Time; Thomas Kuhn's The Structure of Scientific Revolutions; Stan and Jan Berenstain's The Big Honey Hunt (first Berenstain Bears book); Mercè Rodoreda's The Time of the Doves; Ray Bradbury's Something Wicked This Way Comes; Agatha Christie's The Mirror Crack'd from Side to Side. Death of Hermann Hesse, William Faulkner, Vita Sackville-West, E. E. Cummings
- 1963 in literature – Thomas Pynchon's V.; Sylvia Plath's The Bell Jar; Kurt Vonnegut's Cat's Cradle; Pierre Boulle's La Planete des Singes (Planet of the Apes); Maurice Sendak's Where the Wild Things Are; John le Carré's The Spy Who Came In From the Cold; Václav Havel's The Garden Party; Norman Bridwell's Clifford the Big Red Dog; Agatha Christie's The Clocks; Julio Cortazar's Hopscotch; Runer Jonsson's Vicke Viking. Death of Aldous Huxley, Robert Frost, Clifford Odets, Sylvia Plath, William Carlos Williams, C. S. Lewis; John Cowper Powys
- 1964 in literature – Marshall McLuhan's Understanding Media: The Extensions of Man, Thomas Berger's Little Big Man; Leonard Cohen's Flowers for Hitler; Roald Dahl's Charlie and the Chocolate Factory; Hubert Selby Jr.'s Last Exit to Brooklyn; Brian Friel's play Philadelphia, Here I Come! first performed; Philip Larkin's The Whitsun Weddings; Harold Pinter's The Homecoming; Gore Vidal's Julian; Shel Silverstein's The Giving Tree; Agatha Christie's A Caribbean Mystery. Death of Brendan Behan, Ian Fleming, Seán O'Casey, Nella Larsen, Edith Sitwell. Refusal of Nobel Prize by Jean-Paul Sartre
- 1965 in literature – Alex Haley's The Autobiography of Malcolm X, Saul Bellow's Herzog; Norman Mailer's An American Dream; John Fowles's The Magus; John McGahern's The Dark; Jerzy Kosinski's The Painted Bird; Frank Herbert's Dune; Harlan Ellison's "Repent, Harlequin!" Said the Ticktockman; Václav Havel's The Memorandum; Agatha Christie's At Bertram's Hotel and Surprise! Surprise!. Death of T. S. Eliot, W. Somerset Maugham
- 1966 in literature – Julio Cortázar's All Fires The Fire; Mikhail Bulgakov's The Master and Margarita; Thomas Pynchon's The Crying of Lot 49; Jean Rhys's Wide Sargasso Sea; Truman Capote's In Cold Blood; Leonard Cohen's Beautiful Losers; Larry McMurtry's The Last Picture Show; Tom Stoppard's play Rosencrantz and Guildenstern Are Dead first performed; Basil Buntings' Briggflatts; The Witch's Daughter by Nina Bawden; Babel-17 by Samuel R. Delany; Agatha Christie's Third Girl. Death of Frank O'Connor, Brian O'Nolan, Evelyn Waugh
- 1967 in literature – Gabriel García Márquez's Cien años de soledad (One Hundred Years of Solitude); Vladimir Nabokov's Speak, Memory: An Autobiography Revisited; Bernard Malamud's The Fixer; Flann O'Brien's The Third Policeman; Milan Kundera's Žert (The Joke); Marshall McLuhan and Quentin Fiore's The Medium is the Massage: An Inventory of Effects; William Manchester's The Death of a President; Robert K. Massie's Nicholas and Alexandra; Allan W. Eckert's Wild Season; Roger Zelazny's Lord of Light; Harlan Ellison's Dangerous Visions; Harlan Ellison's I Have No Mouth, and I Must Scream; S. E. Hinton's The Outsiders; Agatha Christie's Endless Night. Death of Victor Gollancz, Langston Hughes, Carson McCullers, John Masefield, Dorothy Parker, Siegfried Sassoon, Alice B. Toklas, Jean Toomer
- 1968 in literature – Julio Cortázar's Blow-up and Other Stories; Julio Cortázar's 62: A Model Kit; Philip K. Dick's Do Androids Dream of Electric Sheep?; Tom Wolfe's The Electric Kool-Aid Acid Test; Arthur Hailey's Airport; Albert Cohen's Belle du Seigneur; Judith Kerr's The Tiger Who Came to Tea; Elisabeth Beresford's The Wombles; Carlos Castaneda's The Teachings of Don Juan: A Yaqui Way of Knowledge; Ursula K. Le Guin's A Wizard of Earthsea; Samuel R. Delany's Nova; Agatha Christie's By the Pricking of My Thumbs; Marguerite Yourcenar's The Abyss; Haddis Alemayehu's Love to the Grave. Death of John Steinbeck, Edna Ferber, Upton Sinclair, Enid Blyton, Mervyn Peake
- 1969 in literature – inaugural Booker Prize awarded to P. H. Newby's Something to Answer For; Manuel Puig's Heartbreak Tango; Mario Puzo's The Godfather; Philip Roth's Portnoy's Complaint; Eric Carle's The Very Hungry Caterpillar; Kurt Vonnegut's Slaughterhouse-Five; Vladimir Nabokov's Ada or Ardor: A Family Chronicle; William Steig's Sylvester and the Magic Pebble; Maya Angelou's I Know Why The Caged Bird Sings; John Fowles's The French Lieutenant's Woman; Harlan Ellison's A Boy and His Dog; Agatha Christie's Hallowe'en Party; Sam Greenlee's The Spook Who Sat By the Door. Death of Jack Kerouac, B. Traven, Leonard Woolf

=== 1970s ===
- 1970 in literature – Judy Blume's Are You There God? It's Me, Margaret., Muriel Spark's The Driver's Seat; Judith Kerr's Mog the Forgetful Cat; J. G. Farrell's Troubles; Toni Morrison's The Bluest Eye; James Dickey's Deliverance; Roald Dahl's Fantastic Mr. Fox; Terry Southern's Blue Movie; Jim Bouton's Ball Four; Ted Hughes's Crow; Nina Bawden's The Birds on the Trees; Maurice Sendak's In the Night Kitchen; Larry Niven's Ringworld; Agatha Christie's Passenger to Frankfurt; Annette Tison and Talus Taylor's Barbapapa; Roger Zelazny's Nine Princes in Amber. Death of Máirtín Ó Cadhain; Erich Maria Remarque;
- 1971 in literature – Frederick Forsyth's The Day of the Jackal; Carlos Castaneda's A Separate Reality: Further Conversations with Don Juan; Dr. Seuss' The Lorax; Xaviera Hollander's The Happy Hooker: My Own Story; Rosamunde Pilcher's The End of Summer; Roger Hargreaves's Mr. Men; Agatha Christie's Nemesis and The Golden Ball and Other Stories. Death of Ogden Nash, Stevie Smith
- 1972 in literature – Richard Bach's Jonathan Livingston Seagull; Hunter S. Thompson's Fear and Loathing in Las Vegas; Ira Levin's The Stepford Wives; Richard Adams's Watership Down; Arkady and Boris Strugatsky's Roadside Picnic; Isaac Asimov's The Gods Themselves; Agatha Christie's Elephants Can Remember. Death of Ezra Pound, L. P. Hartley
- 1973 in literature – Julio Cortázar's Libro de Manuel; Thomas Pynchon's Gravity's Rainbow; J. G. Ballard's Crash; J. G. Farrell's The Siege of Krishnapur; Gore Vidal's Burr; Peter Shaffer's play Equus first performed; Aleksandr Solzhenitsyn's The Gulag Archipelago; John Bellairs' The House with a Clock in Its Walls; Kurt Vonnegut's Breakfast of Champions; Nina Bawden's Carrie's War; Arthur C. Clarke's Rendezvous with Rama; Dean Koontz's Demon Seed; Agatha Christie's Postern of Fate. Death of W. H. Auden, J. R. R. Tolkien, B. S. Johnson
- 1974 in literature – Julio Cortázar's Octahedron; Ernesto Sábato's Abbadón, The Exterminator; Carl Bernstein & Bob Woodward's All the President's Men; Stephen King's Carrie; Peter Benchley's Jaws; Erica Jong's Fear of Flying; Jill Murphy's The Worst Witch; James Herbert's The Rats; Agatha Christie's Poirot's Early Cases. Death of Edmund Blunden, Georgette Heyer, William Gardner Smith
- 1975 in literature – James Clavell's Shogun; Stephen King's 'Salem's Lot; Jorge Luis Borges's The Book of Sand; Samuel R. Delany's Dhalgren; E. L. Doctorow's Ragtime; Carlos Fuentes' Terra Nostra; James Herbert's The Fog; Diana Wynne Jones' Cart and Cwidder; Agatha Christie's Curtain. Death of P. G. Wodehouse, Saint-John Perse, Thornton Wilder
- 1976 in literature – Manuel Puig's Kiss of the Spider Woman; Anne Rice's Interview with the Vampire; Richard Yates's The Easter Parade; Mildred D. Taylor's Roll of Thunder, Hear My Cry; Bob Woodward and Carl Bernstein's The Final Days; Samuel R. Delany's Triton; Alex Haley's Roots: The Saga of an American Family; Agatha Christie's Sleeping Murder; Marc Brown's Arthur's Nose (first Arthur book). Death of Agatha Christie, André Malraux
- 1977 in literature – Iris Murdoch's The Sea, the Sea; Toni Morrison's Song of Solomon; Stephen King's The Shining; J. R. R. Tolkien's The Silmarillion; Frederick Pohl's Gateway; Diana Wynne Jones' Charmed Life; Shirley Hughes's Dogger; Patrick Leigh Fermor's A Time of Gifts; Terry Brooks' The Sword of Shannara; Michael Moorcock's The Condition of Muzak. Death of Anaïs Nin, Vladimir Nabokov, Dennis Wheatley, Terence Rattigan
- 1978 in literature – John Irving's The World According to Garp; J. G. Farrell's The Singapore Grip; Judi Barrett's Cloudy with a Chance of Meatballs; John Cheever's The Stories of John Cheever; Stephen King's The Stand; Harold Pinter's Betrayal; Ken Follett's Eye of the Needle; Octavia Butler's Kindred; Roy Heath's The Murderer, Dambudzo Marechera's The House of Hunger, Raymond Briggs's The Snowman, Roger Hargreaves's Timbuctoo. Death of F. R. Leavis, Hugh MacDiarmid, Georgi Markov
- 1979 in literature – Douglas Adams's The Hitchhiker's Guide to the Galaxy; Italo Calvino's Se una notte d'inverno un viaggiatore (If on a winter's night a traveler); V.S. Naipaul's A Bend in the River, Milan Kundera's Kniha smíchu a zapomnení (The Book of Laughter and Forgetting); Angela Sommer-Bodenburg's Der kleine Vampir (The Little Vampire); William Styron's Sophie's Choice; Norman Mailer's The Executioner's Song; Jeffrey Archer's Kane and Abel; Peter Shaffer's play Amadeus first performed; Flora Thompson's Heatherley; Arthur C. Clarke's The Fountains of Paradise; Ken Follett's Triple; Agatha Christie's Miss Marple's Final Cases and Two Other Stories, Rosemary Wells's Max & Ruby. Death of J. G. Farrell, Jean Rhys

=== 1980s ===
- 1980 in literature – John le Carré's Smiley's People; Robert Ludlum's Jason Bourne trilogy; J. M. Coetzee's Waiting for the Barbarians; William Maxwell's So Long, See You Tomorrow; Anthony Burgess's Earthly Powers; Umberto Eco's Il nome della rosa (The Name of the Rose); John Kennedy Toole's A Confederacy of Dunces; Gay Talese's Thy Neighbor's Wife; Brian Friel's play Translations first performed; Ken Follett's The Key to Rebecca; Robert Munsch's The Paper Bag Princess. Death of Jean-Paul Sartre, Alejo Carpentier, Henry Miller, Katherine Anne Porter, C. P. Snow, Kenneth Tynan
- 1981 in literature – Salman Rushdie's Midnight's Children; Thomas Harris's Red Dragon; Gary K. Wolf's Who Censored Roger Rabbit?; Roger Hargreaves's Little Miss. Death of Nelson Algren, Gwendolyn B. Bennett, Christy Brown, Eugenio Montale, William Saroyan, Philip Toynbee
- 1982 in literature – José Saramago's Memorial do Convento (Baltasar and Blimunda); Alice Walker's The Color Purple; William Steig's Doctor De Soto; Primo Levi's Se non ora, quando? (If Not Now, When?); L. Ron Hubbard's Battlefield Earth; Isabel Allende's La casa de los espíritus (The House of the Spirits); Charles Bukowski's Ham on Rye; Roald Dahl's The BFG; Tom Stoppard's The Real Thing; Fernando Pessoa's The Book of Disquiet; Stephen King's The Gunslinger; David Eddings' The Belgariad; Ken Follett's The Man from St. Petersburg. Death of Louis Aragon, Philip K. Dick, Ayn Rand
- 1983 in literature – J. M. Coetzee's Life & Times of Michael K; Salman Rushdie's Shame; Terry Pratchett's Discworld; Parker Brothers and Random House publish the first Care Bears books; Ken Follett's On Wings of Eagles; Katherine Holabird's Angelina Ballerina, Norman Mailer's Ancient Evenings; Stephen King's Pet Sematary; Dean Koontz's Phantoms; Lynley Dodd's Hairy Maclary from Donaldson's Dairy; Palanca Awardee's Luha ng Buwaya. Death of Arthur Koestler, Nikolaus Pevsner, Mikey Smith, Rebecca West, Tennessee Williams
- 1984 in literature – Milan Kundera's The Unbearable Lightness of Being; José Saramago's O Ano da Morte de Ricardo Reis (The Year of the Death of Ricardo Reis); Richard Harris' play Stepping Out first performed; Don DeLillo's White Noise; Julian Barnes's Flaubert's Parrot; Tom Clancy's The Hunt for Red October; Milorad Pavic's Dictionary of the Khazars; Antonio Tabucchi's Indian Nocturne; Glen Cook's The Black Company. Death of Julio Cortázar, John Betjeman, Truman Capote, Michel Foucault, Chester Himes, Alexander Trocchi
- 1985 in literature – Margaret Atwood's The Handmaid's Tale; Cormac McCarthy’s Blood Meridian Gabriel García Márquez's El amor en los tiempos del cólera (Love in the Time of Cholera); Patrick Süskind's Perfume; Carlos Fuentes's The Old Gringo; Chris Van Allsburg's The Polar Express; Orson Scott Card's Ender's Game; Ken Follett's Lie Down with Lions. Death of Italo Calvino, Heinrich Böll, Basil Bunting, Geoffrey Grigson, Philip Larkin, Robert Graves
- 1986 in literature – Thomas Bernhard's Extinction; Caryl Churchill's A Mouthful of Birds; Stephen King's It; Brian Lumley's Necroscope; Tony Ross' I Want My Potty; Clive Barker's The Hellbound Heart; Carl Sagan's Contact; Brian Jacques' Redwall; Diana Wynne Jones' Howl's Moving Castle, Robert Munsch's Love You Forever. Death of Jorge Luis Borges, Simone de Beauvoir, Jean Genet, Bessie Head, Christopher Isherwood, Juan Rulfo, Jaroslav Seifert
- 1987 in literature – Toni Morrison's Beloved; Alfred Uhry's play Driving Miss Daisy first performed; Haruki Murakami's Noruwei no mori (Norwegian Wood); Tom Clancy's Patriot Games; Robert Hughes' The Fatal Shore; Martin Handford's Where's Wally?; Stephen King's Misery; Dean Koontz's Watchers. Death of Jean Anouilh, James Baldwin, Primo Levi, Marguerite Yourcenar
- 1988 in literature – Salman Rushdie's The Satanic Verses; Noam Chomsky's Manufacturing Consent: The Political Economy of the Mass Media; Stephen Hawking's A Brief History of Time; Roald Dahl's Matilda; Peter Carey's Oscar and Lucinda; Alan Hollinghurst's The Swimming Pool Library; Grazyna Miller's Curriculum, Umberto Eco's Il pendolo di Foucault (Foucault's Pendulum). Death of Raymond Carver, Marghanita Laski, Alan Paton, Roger Hargreaves, Sacheverell Sitwell
- 1989 in literature – Kazuo Ishiguro's The Remains of the Day; John Banville's The Book of Evidence; Amy Tan's The Joy Luck Club; Michael Rosen's We're Going on a Bear Hunt; Ken Follett's The Pillars of the Earth; David McKee's Elmer. Death of Samuel Beckett, Thomas Bernhard, Daphne du Maurier, C. L. R. James, Georges Simenon

=== 1990s ===
- 1990 in literature – John McGahern's Amongst Women; W. G. Sebald's Vertigo; Raphael Patai's The Hebrew Goddess; Michael Critchton's Jurassic Park; Terry Pratchett and Neil Gaiman's Good Omens; Robert Jordan's The Eye of the World; William Steig's Shrek!; Maeve Binchy's Circle of Friends; Brian Friel's play Dancing at Lughnasa first performed. Death of Roald Dahl, Dodie Smith, Malcolm Forbes, Alberto Moravia, Walker Percy, Anya Seton, Patrick White
- 1991 in literature – José Saramago's O Evangelho Segundo Jesus Cristo (The Gospel According to Jesus Christ); Norman Rush's Mating; Bret Easton Ellis's American Psycho; Josephine Hart's Damage; Rohinton Mistry's Such a Long Journey; P. J. O'Rourke's Parliament of Whores; Henning Mankell's Mördare utan ansikte (Faceless Killers – first in the Wallander series); Diana Gabaldon's Outlander; Koji Suzuki's Ring; Ken Follett's Night Over Water; Agatha Christie's Problem at Pollensa Bay and Other Stories. Death of Graham Greene, Isaac Bashevis Singer, Elisaveta Bagriana, Jerzy Kosiński, Angus Wilson, Frank Yerby
- 1992 in literature – Harry Mulisch's De Ontdekking van de Hemel (The Discovery of Heaven); Salman Rushdie's Imaginary Homelands; Michael Ondaatje's The English Patient; Cormac McCarthy's All the Pretty Horses; Jim Cartwright's play The Rise and Fall of Little Voice; Michael Connelly's The Black Echo; Barry Unsworth's Sacred Hunger; Dean Koontz's Hideaway; R. L. Stine's Goosebumps. Death of Alex Haley, Angela Carter, George MacBeth, Isaac Asimov, Iceberg Slim, Richard Yates, Audre Lorde
- 1993 in literature – Irvine Welsh's Trainspotting; E. Annie Proulx' The Shipping News; Sebastian Faulks's Birdsong; Richard Paul Evans's The Christmas Box; Ken Follett's A Dangerous Fortune. Death of Kobo Abe, Anthony Burgess, William Golding, William L. Shirer
- 1994 in literature – Herta Müller's Herztier (The Land of Green Plums); Carol Shields's The Stone Diaries; Terry Goodkind's Wizard's First Rule; Antonio Tabucchi's Pereira Maintains. Death of Elias Canetti, James Clavell, Ralph Ellison, Eugène Ionesco
- 1995 in literature – James Redfield's The Celestine Prophecy; José Saramago's Ensaio sobre a cegueira (Blindness); Haruki Murakami's Nejimaki-dori kuronikuru (The Wind-Up Bird Chronicle); Philip Pullman's His Dark Materials; Samuel R. Delany's Hogg; Dean Koontz's Intensity; Ken Follett's A Place Called Freedom; Bernard Cornwell's The Winter King. Death of Gerald Durrell, Kingsley Amis, Olga Ivinskaya (mistress of Boris Pasternak), Patricia Highsmith, Stephen Spender, Toni Cade Bambara
- 1996 in literature – Inaugural International Dublin Literary Award and Orange Prize for Fiction awarded; David Foster Wallace's Infinite Jest; Frank McCourt's Angela's Ashes; George R.R. Martin's A Song of Ice and Fire; Chuck Palahniuk's Fight Club; Tim Lahaye, Jerry B. Jenkins's Left Behind; Ken Follett's The Third Twin. Death of Erma Bombeck, Joseph Brodsky, Marguerite Duras, Timothy Leary, Carl Sagan
- 1997 in literature – J. K. Rowling's Harry Potter; Don DeLillo's Underworld; Arundhati Roy's The God of Small Things; Charles Frazier's Cold Mountain; Patrick Marber's play Closer first performed; Agatha Christie's While the Light Lasts and Other Stories and The Harlequin Tea Set. Death of Allen Ginsberg, William S. Burroughs, James Dickey, James A. Michener, P. H. Newby, Kathy Acker
- 1998 in literature – Orhan Pamuk's Benim Adim Kirmizi (My Name Is Red); Michael Cunningham's The Hours; Julian Barnes's England, England; Alice McDermott's Charming Billy; Ian McEwan's Amsterdam; Beryl Bainbridge's Master Georgie; Michel Houellebecq's Les Particules élémentaires (Atomised); Michael Connelly's Blood Work; Bret Easton Ellis's Glamorama; Louis Sachar's Holes; Diana Wynne Jones' Dark Lord of Derkholm; Ken Follett's The Hammer of Eden. Death of Carlos Castaneda, Octavio Paz, Lawrence Sanders, Benjamin Spock, Dorothy West, Grace Paley, Ted Hughes, Rumer Godden
- 1999 in literature – J. M. Coetzee's Disgrace; Joanne Harris's Chocolat; Ha Jin's Waiting; Colm Tóibín's The Blackwater Lightship; Julia Donaldson's The Gruffalo; Neil Gaiman's Stardust; Steven Erikson's Gardens of the Moon. Death of Iris Murdoch, Sarah Kane, Joseph Heller, Mario Puzo, John F. Kennedy Jr.

== 21st century ==
=== 2000s ===
- 2000 in literature – Zadie Smith's White Teeth; Michael Chabon's The Amazing Adventures of Kavalier & Clay; Naomi Klein's No Logo; Mario Vargas Llosa's The Feast of the Goat; Dan Brown's Angels & Demons; Maeve Binchy's Scarlet Feather; Ken Follett's Code to Zero; Mark K. Danielewski's House of Leaves. Death of Charles M. Schulz, Sally Amis (daughter of Sir Kingsley and sister of Martin), Gwendolyn Brooks, Penelope Fitzgerald
- 2001 in literature – Tahar Ben Jelloun's Cette aveuglante absence de lumière (This Blinding Absence of Light); Neil Gaiman's American Gods; Yann Martel's Life of Pi; Jonathan Franzen's The Corrections; W. G. Sebald's Austerlitz; Ian McEwan's Atonement; Ann Brashare's The Sisterhood of the Traveling Pants; Brian Jacques' Castaways of the Flying Dutchman; Ken Follett's Jackdaws; Stephen Hawking's The Universe in a Nutshell. Death of Douglas Adams, Ken Kesey, Robert Ludlum, R. K. Narayan, W. G. Sebald, Auberon Waugh (son of Evelyn Waugh)
- 2002 in literature – Orhan Pamuk's Kar (Snow); Julia Glass' Three Junes; Haruki Murakami's Umibe no Kafuka (Kafka on the Shore); Jonathan Safran Foer's Everything Is Illuminated; Jeffrey Eugenides's Middlesex; Neil Gaiman's Coraline; Ken Follett's Hornet Flight. Death of Camilo José Cela, John B. Keane, Spike Milligan, Chaim Potok
- 2003 in literature – Dan Brown's The Da Vinci Code; Shirley Hazzard's The Great Fire; Per Petterson's Ut og stjæle hester (Out Stealing Horses); Khaled Hosseini's The Kite Runner; Dean Koontz's Odd Thomas; Christopher Paolini's Eragon; Kate DiCamillo's The Tale of Despereaux; Jonathan Stroud's The Amulet of Samarkand. Death of Roberto Bolaño, Howard Fast, Edward Said
- 2004 in literature – Philip Roth's The Plot Against America; Lily Tuck's The News from Paraguay; José Saramago's Ensaio sobre a Lucidez (Seeing); Colm Tóibín's The Master; Alan Hollinghurst's The Line of Beauty; Lawrence Lessig's Free Culture; Roberto Bolaño's 2666; David Mitchell's Cloud Atlas; Alan Bennett's play The History Boys first performed; Susanna Clarke's Jonathan Strange & Mr Norrell; Ken Follett's Whiteout. Death of Janet Frame, Stieg Larsson, Czeslaw Milosz, Jeff Nuttall, Bernice Rubens, Françoise Sagan, Hubert Selby Jr., Susan Sontag
- 2005 in literature – Eduardo Sacheri's The Question in Their Eyes; Kazuo Ishiguro's Never Let Me Go; John Banville's The Sea; Rick Riordan's The Lightning Thief; Chuck Palahniuk's Haunted; Jane O'Connor's Fancy Nancy, Aebersold and Chanda Bell's The Elf on the Shelf; Stieg Larsson's The Girl With the Dragon Tattoo; Stephenie Meyer's Twilight; Carrie Vaughn's Kitty and the Midnight Hour. Death of Saul Bellow, John Fowles, Elizabeth Janeway, Arthur Miller, Claude Simon, Hunter S. Thompson, Yvonne Vera, August Wilson
- 2006 in literature – Chimamanda Ngozi Adichie's Half of a Yellow Sun; Richard Dawkins's The God Delusion; Kiran Desai's The Inheritance of Loss; Roberto Saviano's Gormorra (Gomorrah); Gerbrand Bakker's Boven is het stil (The Twin); Cormac McCarthy's The Road; Stieg Larsson's The Girl Who Played With Fire; John Boyne's The Boy in the Striped Pajamas; Joe Abercrombie's The Blade Itself; Ngũgĩ wa Thiong'o's Wizard of the Crow. Death of Peter Benchley, Octavia E. Butler, Betty Friedan, Naguib Mahfouz, John McGahern, Muriel Spark, Mickey Spillane, Wendy Wasserstein
- 2007 in literature – Nick Stafford's play version of Michael Morpurgo's novel War Horse first performed; Dennis Johnson's Tree of Smoke; Naomi Klein's The Shock Doctrine; Junot Díaz's The Brief Wondrous Life of Oscar Wao; Stieg Larsson's The Girl Who Kicked the Hornets' Nest; Jeff Kinney's Diary of a Wimpy Kid; Patrick Rothfuss' The Name of the Wind; Christopher Hitchens' God Is Not Great; Ken Follett's World Without End; Dr Tapan's Kalahandi. Death of Norman Mailer, Kurt Vonnegut
- 2008 in literature – Aravind Adiga's The White Tiger; Suzanne Collins' The Hunger Games; Neil Gaiman's The Graveyard Book. Death of Aimé Césaire, Michael Crichton, Arthur C. Clarke, David Foster Wallace, Robert Giroux, Roy Heath, Harold Pinter, Alain Robbe-Grillet, Aleksandr Solzhenitsyn, Studs Terkel, Margaret Truman
- 2009 in literature – Haruki Murakami's Ichi-kyu-hachi-yon (1Q84); Colm Tóibín's Brooklyn; Reki Kawahara's Sword Art Online; James Dashner's The Maze Runner; Lev Grossman's The Magicians. Death of J. G. Ballard, Philip José Farmer, Frank McCourt, Tayeb Salih, Budd Schulberg, John Updike

=== 2010s ===
- 2010 in literature – Edmund de Waal's The Hare with Amber Eyes; Emma Donoghue's Room; Brandon Sanderson's The Way of Kings; Anne Marie Pace's Vampirina Ballerina, Ken Follett's Fall of Giants; 1970 Lost Man Booker Prize awarded. Death of Louis Auchincloss, Beryl Bainbridge, Ruth Cohn, Miguel Delibes, Philippa Foot, Martin Gardner, Tony Judt, Frank Kermode, David Markson, Tomás Eloy Martínez, Harry Mulisch, J. D. Salinger, José Saramago, Erich Segal, Alan Sillitoe, Howard Zinn
- 2011 in literature – E. L. James' Fifty Shades of Grey; Alexis Jenni's L'Art français de la guerre; Alan Hollinghurst's The Stranger's Child; Hisham Matar's Anatomy of a Disappearance; Téa Obreht's The Tiger's Wife. Death of Patrick Leigh Fermor, Édouard Glissant, Josephine Hart, Václav Havel, Christopher Hitchens, Russell Hoban, Brian Jacques, Diana Wynne Jones, Dick King-Smith, Agota Kristof, Arnošt Lustig, Anne McCaffrey, Gonzalo Rojas, Joanna Russ, Ernesto Sabato, Moacyr Scliar, Tomás Segovia, Jorge Semprún, Christa Wolf
- 2012 in literature – John Grisham's The Racketeer; Gillian Flynn's Gone Girl; Anne Marie Pace's Vampirina Ballerina; Henry Lewis, Jonathan Sayer, and Henry Shields' The Play That Goes Wrong; Zadie Smith's NW; R. J. Palacio's Wonder; Ken Follett's Winter of the World. Death of Maeve Binchy, Carlos Fuentes, Adrienne Rich, Gore Vidal
- 2013 in literature – Dan Brown's Inferno; Kevin Kwan's Crazy Rich Asians; Donna Tartt's The Goldfinch. Death of Seamus Heaney, Chinua Achebe, Iain Banks, Tom Clancy, Bryan Forbes, Oscar Hijuelos, Elmore Leonard, Doris Lessing, Ruth Prawer Jhabvala, Colin Wilson
- 2014 in literature – Stephen King's Mr. Mercedes; Ken Follett's Edge of Eternity; Marlon James' A Brief History of Seven Killings. Death of Nadine Gordimer, Sam Greenlee, P. D. James, Gabriel García Márquez
- 2015 in literature – Paul Beatty's The Sellout; Paula Hawkins's The Girl on the Train; Hanya Yanagihara's A Little Life. Death of André Brink, Assia Djebar, Günter Grass, Terry Pratchett
- 2016 in literature – Colson Whitehead's The Underground Railroad; John Preston's A Very English Scandal. Death of Yves Bonnefoy, E. R. Braithwaite, Anita Brookner, Leonard Cohen, Umberto Eco, Harper Lee, William Trevor
- 2017 in literature – George Saunders' Lincoln in the Bardo; Jesmyn Ward's Sing, Unburied, Sing; Jez Butterworth's The Ferryman; Ken Follett's A Column of Fire. Death of Peter Abrahams, Brian Aldiss, John Berger, Kate Millett
- 2018 in literature – Anna Burns' Milkman; Sigrid Nunez's The Friend; Paula Hawkins' Into the Water. Death of Stephen Hawking, V. S. Naipaul, Philip Roth, Claribel Alegría, Harlan Ellison, William Goldman
- 2019 in literature – Charlie Mackesy's The Boy, the Mole, the Fox and the Horse; Michel Houellebecq's Serotonin; Bernardine Evaristo's Girl, Woman, Other. Death of John Burningham, Judith Kerr, Toni Morrison, Andrea Levy, Bernard Dadié

=== 2020s ===
- 2020 in literature – Hilary Mantel's The Mirror and the Light; Jenny Offill's Weather, Maggie O'Farrell's Hamnet; Douglas Stuart's Shuggie Bain. Death of Kamau Brathwaite, Stanley Crouch, Harold Evans, Naomi Long Madgett, John le Carré, Alison Lurie
- 2021 in literature – Stephen King's Billy Summers; Damon Galgut's The Promise; Wole Soyinka's Chronicles from the Land of the Happiest People on Earth. Death of Nawal El Saadawi, Joan Didion, Lawrence Ferlinghetti, Keri Hulme, Jill Murphy, Anthony Thwaite
- 2022 in literature – Isabel Allende's Violeta; Shehan Karunatilaka's The Seven Moons of Maali Almeida. Death of Raymond Briggs, George Lamming, Hilary Mantel
- 2023 in literature – Bret Easton Ellis's The Shards. Death of Fay Weldon, Ama Ata Aidoo, Martin Amis, Edward Baugh, Pete Brown, A. S. Byatt, Robert Gottlieb, Milan Kundera, Louise Meriwether, Micere Githae Mugo, Benjamin Zephaniah
- 2024 in literature – Stephen King's You Like It Darker; Sally Rooney's Intermezzo; Percival Everett's James. Death of Fleur Adcock, Paul Bailey, Lynne Reid Banks, Barbara Taylor Bradford, Breyten Breytenbach, John Burnside, Maryse Condé, Shirley Conran, Nikki Giovanni, James Matthews, Alice Munro, Edna O'Brien, Nathaniel Tarn
- 2025 in literature
- 2026 in literature
