= Paul Einhorn =

Baltic German historian

Paul Einhorn (born in Iecava, Latvia, the exact birth date is not known, died in 1655 in Jelgava) was a famous historian of the Latvians and a Lutheran pastor.

== Lutheran beliefs and attempts to exterminate the pre-Christian religion of the Latvians ==
In 1615 Paul Einhorn studied at the university of Rostock. He was a pastor from 1621 and superintendent of Courland from 1636. He is described as an ardent Lutheran, and he spent much effort fighting against superstition. He received a good classical education which is also seen in his works, which gained its importance because of their description of Latvian pre-Christian beliefs, which he tried to exterminate.

== Literary works ==
He has published number of books:

- 1627 — "Wiederlegunge der Abgötterey..."
- 1636 — "Reformatio gentis Letticae..."

But he is mostly known because of his historical book about Latvians published in 1649 — "Historia Lettica" (das ist Beschreibung der Lettischen Nation in welcher von der Letten als alten Einwohner und Besitzer des Lieflandes, Curlandes und Semgallen Namen, Uhrsprung oder Ankunfft ihrem Gottes-Dienst, ihrer Republica oder Regimente so sie in der Heydenschafft gehabt, auch ihren Sitten, Geberden, Gewonheiten, Natur und Eigenschaften etc. gruendlich und uembstaendig Meldung geschickt. Der Teutschen Nation und allen der Historischen Warheit Liebhabern zu einem noethigen Unterricht zusammen getragen und in den Druck verfertiget durch Paulum Einhorn, Fuerstlichen Curlaendischen Superintendenten P.M. Dorpt in Liefland Gedruckt durch Johann Vogeln, der Koenigl. Acad. Buchdruker, im Jahr 1649).
