= Heinouchi Yoshimasa =

Heinouchi Yoshimasa (平内 吉政) was a famous master carpenter in Edo-period Japan, and was the progenitor of a long line of master carpenters. In 1608 he wrote the Shoumei (匠明) manual of construction and building design, with the help of his son Masanobu. This book is the most famous of early works on Japanese building construction.
