= Della Casa =

Della Casa is a surname. Notable people with the surname include:

- Giovanni della Casa (1503–1556), Italian poet
- Lisa Della Casa (1919–2012), Swiss soprano
- Roberto Della Casa (born 1942), Italian actor
- Della Casa Appa (1889–1963), one of the first significant Zuni women jewelers
