= On Yixing Teapots =

17th century book on tea

On Yixing Teapots (Note: Also called An Account of the Teapots of Yangxian.) (Chinese: 陽羨茗壺系; pinyin: Yángxiàn Mínghú Xì; Wade–Giles: Yang^{2}-hsien^{4} Ming^{2}-hu^{2} Hsi^{4}; with Yangxian being a Qin Dynasty name for Yixing) is a treatise on Yixing clay teapots written by Ming Dynasty author Zhou Gaoqi (Chou Kao-chi; 周高起; d. 1644–45) in the Chongzhen era ca. 1640. In this book, Zhou provides a detailed account of the origin and history of Yixing teapots, followed by an account of the great masters and their disciples.

== Contents ==
- Yixing Teapot Series
- Origin of Yixing Teapots
- Orthodox school
- Yixing Teapot Masters
- Famous Yixing Teapot Experts
- Elegant styles
- Magical Items
- Diverse Schools of Yixing Teapot makers
