= Shoumei =

1608 manual by Heinouchi Yoshimasa

Shoumei (匠明) is a Japanese 17th-century architectural design manual (Kiwari (木割)). The manual was written by Heinouchi Yoshimasa and first handed by his son Masanobu Heinouchi in 1608 in five scroll formats.

The five volumes are composed of Monkishu (Kiwari for gates), Shakishu (Kiwari of Shrines), Doukishu (Kiwari of temples), Toukishu (Kiwari of Pagodas) and Den-okushu (Kiwari of residences).

The earliest known copy of the text, which is owned by the University of Tokyo, was published sometime between 1697 and 1727.
