= Thurnierbuch =

1530 work on medieval tournaments

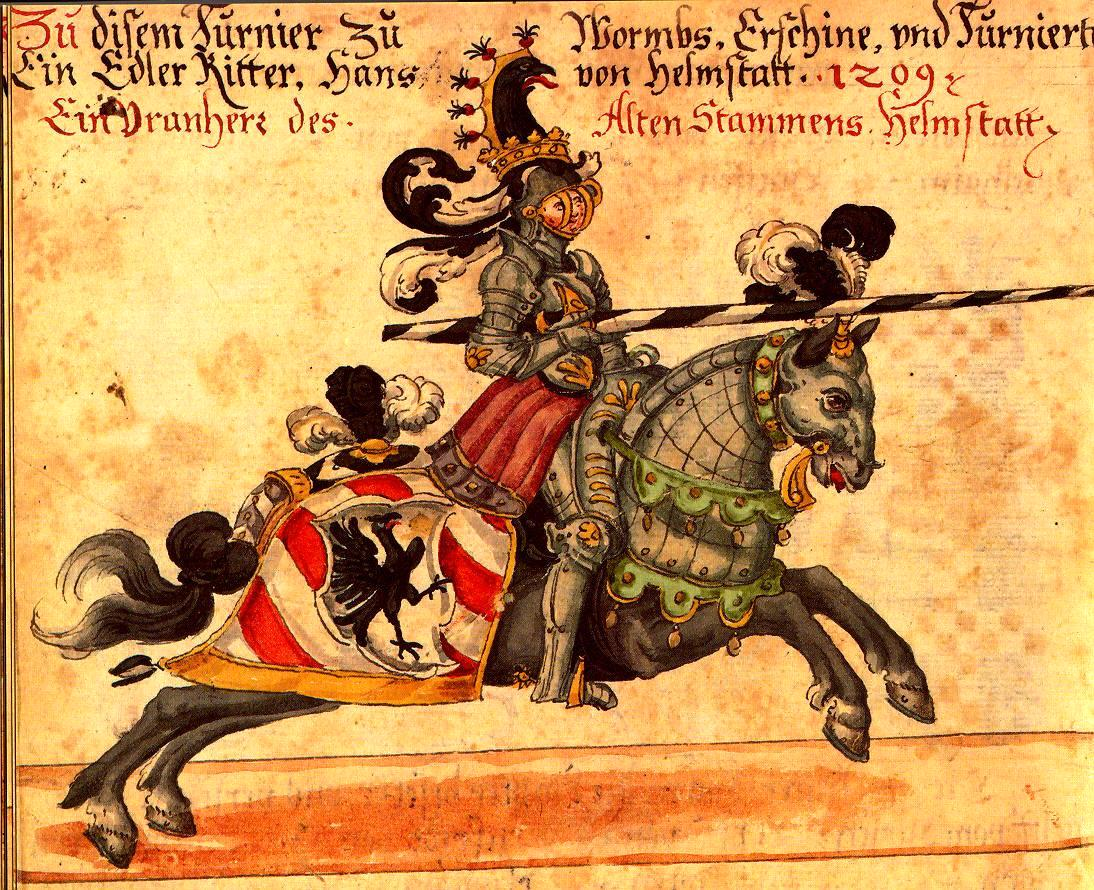
illustration from Codex Rossianus 711, a 1615 manuscript copy of the Thurnierbuch.

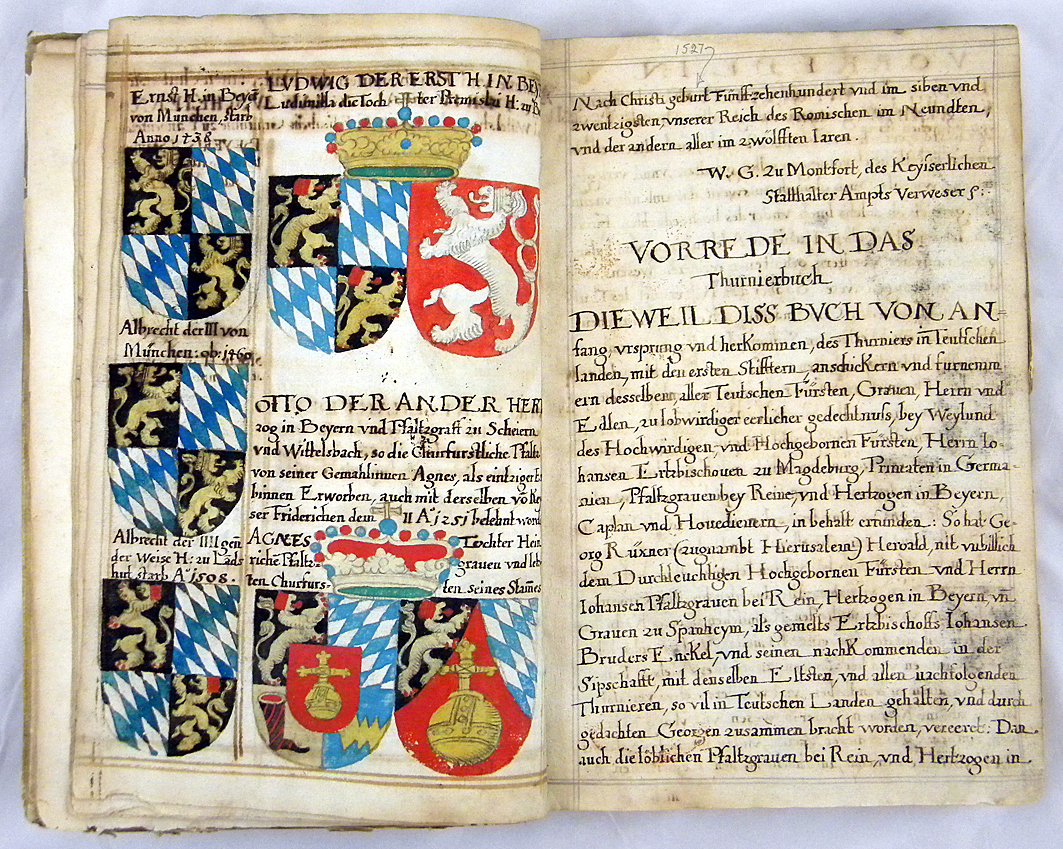
Page from a mid-17th-century manuscript copy based on the 1578/9 Frankfurt edition

The Thurnierbuch ("tournament book"), published in 1530, is an important work on the tradition of medieval tournaments in the Holy Roman Empire.

The full title of the book was Thurnierbuch. Von Anfang, Vrsachen, vrsprung, vnd herkommen der Thurnier im heyligen Römischen Reich Teutscher Nation "Tournament Book: about the beginning, cause, source, and origin of the tournament in the Holy Roman Empire of the German Nation".

It was written by Georg Rüxner (also Rixner; Georg Rixner, genendt Hierosalem Eraldo und Konig der Wappen). Next to nothing is known about Rüxner's biography. He was presumably a Bavarian herold, possibly identical with the imperial herold of Maximilian I depicted by Hans Burgkmair in two woodcuts dated 1504 and 1507. In 1519, Rüxner was present at the election of Charles V. In Nuremberg city records, he is mentioned as a royal herold in 1525–6.

He is also the author of a number of genealogical works, including on the Dukes of Mecklenburg Rüxner's tournament book of 1530 was highly successful, but its partly unfounded claims were criticized even by contemporaries; Froben Christoph von Zimmern relied heavily on Rüxner's book for the Zimmern Chronicle.

The Thurnierbuch contains detailed descriptions of 36 tournaments supposedly held between 938 and 1487, including full lists of participants. Rüxner is the origin of the tradition that the imperial tournaments in Germany were established by Henry the Fowler, but it is now widely accepted that the first 14 tournaments on his list are unhistorical inventions. His account of imperial tournaments during the 15th century, however, may be treated as mostly historical, and Rüxner is thus an important source for the details of tournament rules and practices in Germany during the late medieval period.

The Thurnierbuch was reprinted in Frankfurt by Sigmund Feyerabend in 1578 or 1579. This Frankfurt edition was, in turn, the source for a number of manuscript copies made in the early 17th century.

Rüxner's Floruit spans the first three decades of the 16th century, and it is possible that he published early versions of his work prior to the surviving 1530 edition. Works that may reflect such earlier works by Rüxner were published by Marx Würsung in 1518 and by Ludwig von Eyb the Younger in c. 1525.
