= Fastiginia =

1605 satirical book by Tomé Pinheiro da Veiga

La Fastiginia, written in 1605 by Portuguese author Tomé Pinheiro da Veiga, is a satirical prose in which he reports his experiences in the city of Valladolid, between April and July 1605. Valladolid was then the capital of Spain and was home to the Spanish Royal family.

== The work ==
The full title is "Fastiginia o fastos extraordinarios sacados de la tumba de Merlín, donde fueron hallados junto a la Demanda del Santo Grial por el arzobispo D. Turpín, descubiertos y sacados a la luz por el famoso lusitano fray Pantaleón, que los encontró en un monasterio de novatos... a costa de Jaimes del Temps Perdut, comprador de libros de caballerías".

It was originally written in Portuguese in 1605, and was amplified afterwards, in 1607 and 1620; it is set in three parts: the Philipstrea, on the celebrations organized for the birthday of Philip IV of Spain; the Pratología or Baratillo cotidiano, about the manners, conversation and wit of the ladies; and the Pincigrafía or "description of Valladolid and his natural and moral history". The arrival of English ambassadors Charles Howard, count of Nottingham, and Charles Cornwallis is told in detail.

== Bibliography ==
- PINHEIRO DA VEIGA, T. (ed. de Narciso Alonso Cortés; 1916): Fastiginia o Fastos geniales. Valladolid: Imprenta del Colegio de Santiago.
- PINHEIRO DA VEIGA, T. (ed. de Narciso Alonso Cortés; 1989); Valladolid: Ámbito.
