= Heutelia =

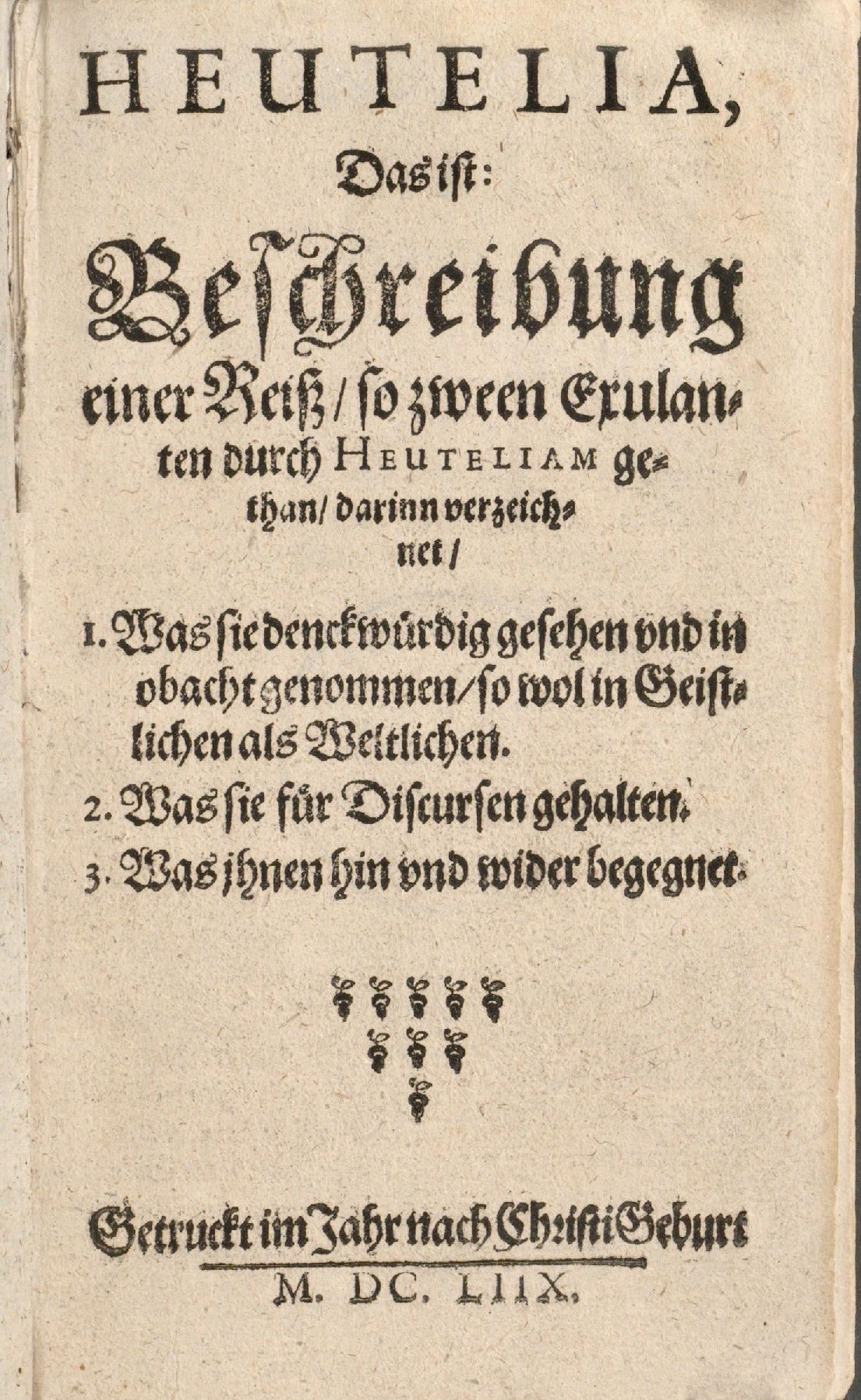
The title page of Heutelia

Heutelia is a German book about a journey through Switzerland, published anonymously in Paris in 1658, and attributed to Hans Franz Veiras. It is notable as a work of baroque literature and as a critical account of social conditions in seventeenth-century Switzerland.

== Pages ==
The book consists of 297 octavo pages. The book has been incorrectly ascribed to Jakob von Graviseth.

== Anagram in the title ==
The title, Heutelia, is an anagram of Helvetia, the Latin name of Switzerland (U and V were considered the same letter). The invented name also evokes the Greek adjective εὔθηλος (euthēlos) meaning "with a full udder," thus playing on stereotypes of the Swiss as a nation of cowherds.
