= L'Impromptu de la garnison de Namur =

1692 Belgian play

L'Impromptu de la garnison de Namur is a Belgian comedy play. It was first published in 1692.

It was anonymously composed in the Spanish Netherlands, after the surrender of Namur to French troops in June 1692. It was reviewed by Florent Carton Dancourt, and played at the Comédie-Française on 26 July 1692, under the name L'Impromptu garnison.
