= Historia Lettica =

1649 book by Paul Einhorn

- Language: German
- Subject: Latvia; Latvian mythology Latvian language
- Publication date: 1649 (Königsberg)
- Publication place: Germany
- Media type: print

Historia Lettica is one of the oldest historical books about Latvia, Latvian mythology and Latvian language. It was written by Lutheran priest Paul Einhorn in the German language and published in 1649.
