= Della Casa Appa =

Zuni women jeweler (1889–1963)

- Born: 1889
- Died: 1963 (aged 73–74)
- Occupation: Jeweler

Della Casa Appa (1889–1963) was one of the first significant Zuni women jewelers. The Zuni are Native American Pueblo peoples native to the Zuni River valley. Della Casa Appa began making jewelry as her husband's assistant and then sold her work at the trading post of Charles Garrett Wallace. The Zuni community eventually recognized Casa Appa's talents and she held the ceremonial affiliation with the Ant fraternity, a rare honor for silversmiths or women at the time. Casa Appa became part of a group of artists who helped set the standard for Native American jewelry.
