= Anatomes totius =

1564 book by André Vésale and Jacques Grévin

Anatomes totius is a book written in 1564 by André Vésale and Jacques Grévin.

In the years after the 1543 publication of De humani corporis fabrica, the physician André Vésale was confronted with a high number of imitators and plagiarizers. It was a groundbreaking work on anatomy, over 700 pages long and filled with illustrations.

== Derived works ==
In the same year as the original publication, Vesalius published a shorter version or abridgement of this work, which featured many illustrations of the original. It was dedicated to Philip II of Spain.

Two years after the 1543 publication, Thomas Geminus (the pseudonym of Thomas Lambrit) printed another abridgment: the Compendiosi totius Anatomiae delineatio. An English translation of this work would appear in 1553 and 1559. Geminus took many of the illustrations from the Fabrica, but unlike the original, printed them on separate sheets. This is caused by the fact that Geminus decided to use copper intaglio plates rather than woodcuts as in the original. Geminus was an engraver and may have done the illustrations. Because of this, the relation between text and images is less clear and many images are gathered on a single sheet without any relation.

His copper plates were sold or lent to Parisian printer André Wechel who also prepared two editions, a Latin one in 1564 and a French edition in 1569. The Latin edition appeared under the title Anatomes totius aere insculpta delineatio. In 1565 he printed a second edition.

The illustrations are also on separate plates. One of the most remarkable plates is an illustration of Adam and Eve at the beginning of the book. The book is somewhat between an abstract and a compendium. Because of the high number of plates, it was more accessible to the non-specialist.

Many of the illustrations were simplified versions of Vesalius's original work. The remarkable landscapes behind the dissected bodies, once so prominent, disappeared. The watermarks of the first Wechel edition (1654) may have been from London. That would most likely mean that the sheets were printed in London and transported to Paris. However, the second edition also contains this watermark of a gauntlet and a star. The precise details remain unknown. One possibility is that Geminus sold the printed sheets instead of the plates.
