= Courageous Exploits of Doctor Syn =

1939 novel by Russell Thorndike

First edition (publ. Rich & Cowan)

The Courageous Exploits of Doctor Syn is the sixth in the series of Doctor Syn novels by Russell Thorndike. Published in 1939, it follows the events of Amazing Quest of Doctor Syn and is followed by Shadow of Doctor Syn.

== Plot ==
In 1781, Doctor Syn continues his adventures as the Scarecrow of Romney Marsh, foiling all attempts to catch him and to break up the Dymchurch smugglers.

== Critical reception ==
"A splendid addition to the world-famed Dr. Syn series," according to The Observer. It received positive reviews for its exciting plot and swift narrative pace, as well as some humorous moments like Syn's pulpit denunciation of himself. "Full of violent action, with all subsidiary figures in good form," wrote Maurice Richardson.

== Publication ==
Originally published by Rich and Cowan in 1939, it has been reprinted many times in both hardcover and paperback editions, including by Arrow Books (1959), Panther (1964) Jarrolds (1966) and other more recent small presses.
