= Doctor Syn Returns =

1935 novel by Russell Thorndike

First edition (publ. Rich & Cowan)

Doctor Syn Returns is the third in the series of Doctor Syn novels by Russell Thorndike. Published in 1935, it follows Doctor Syn on the High Seas and is followed by Further Adventures of Doctor Syn. It tells the story of Syn, who has tired of piracy, trying to settle down as the vicar of the little town of Dymchurch in Kent, England.

== Plot ==
In 1775, Syn's attempt to live an obscure life fails when he is drawn into the local smuggling trade. To protect his parishioners from the agents of the King's Revenue, Syn becomes the masked Scarecrow of Romney Marsh and becomes leader of the smugglers.

== Critical reception ==
"A triumph in its own particular class," said The Daily Mirror. It received favorable reviews. The Daily Herald entreated Thorndike to write more novels. The Sunday Times noted that it had stylistic elements that were more graceful than most thrillers. The Observer singled out the gruesome cockroach death as particularly memorable.

Reviewing the US version of the novel for the New York Tribune, humorist Will Cuppy described it as old-fashioned and out of step with current trends in adventure novels, but nonetheless enjoyable. The New York Times likewise reviewed it favorably as very entertaining, with an improbable plot made less so by comparing it to the antics of contemporary Prohibition smugglers.

== Publication ==
Originally published by Rich and Cowan in early 1935, it was also serialized in The Daily Herald that November.

An expanded version of the novel was published in the United States in 1935 by The Dial Press. It was retitled The Scarecrow Rides.

It has been reprinted many times in both hardcover and paperback editions, including by Cherry Tree Books (1938), Arrow Books (1959), Panther (1964), Jarrolds (1966), Ballantine Books (1974) and other more recent small presses.

== Adaptations ==
In 1944 a "Battle of Britain" adaptation of Thorndike's novel was announced with the title Originally Syn, written by Thorndike and Emma Treckman, though it did not tour as planned.

Three years later, The Return of Doctor Syn by Russell Thorndike and Emma Treckman premiered at the Theatre Royal in Windsor on 17 November, 1947 for a short run. The cast included Thorndike as Christopher Syn, with Diana Calderwood, Ruth Goddard as Lady Caroline, Desmond Keith as Sir Anthony Cobtree. It was directed by John Counsell. Set in 1775, the plot follows the novel of Doctor Syn Returns. The Stage praised the production's acting and design, with appreciation for the dramatic spectacle, though noted that "pruning is needed."

In 2006, an abridged version of the novel was broadcast on BBC Radio 4. Comprising half of a ten-part series titled Doctor Syn, it was read by Rufus Sewell.
