= Further Adventures of Doctor Syn =

1936 novel by Russell Thorndike

First edition (publ. Rich & Cowan)

The Further Adventures of Doctor Syn is the fourth in the series of Doctor Syn novels by Russell Thorndike. Published in 1936, it follows the events of Doctor Syn Returns and is followed by Amazing Quest of Doctor Syn.

== Plot ==
The novel is a highly episodic series of adventures as Syn, in his guise as the Scarecrow outwits the king's agents and keeps his band of Dymchurch smugglers out of prison. Set in 1776.

== Critical reception ==
"A likable rascal with much courage and a pretty wit," according to the Western Mail, "his escapades make enthralling reading." Although another critic found the adventures "naive", The Observer embraced the fantastical plot as deeply enjoyable. The novel was compared favorably to the previous novel in the series and was well received by critics, noting its evocative period setting and its more episodic structure. The Times Literary Supplement called the escape from Dover Castle "ingenious".

== Publication ==
Originally published by Rich & Cowan, it has been reprinted many times in both hardcover and paperback editions, including by Arrow Books (1959), Jarrolds (1966) and other recent small presses.

== Adaptation ==
The novel inspired the William Buchanan novel Christopher Syn, upon which the Disney film The Scarecrow of Romney Marsh is based, hence the similarities between the plots.

In 2007, an abridged version of the novel was broadcast on BBC Radio 4. Comprising half of a ten-part series titled The Further Adventures of Doctor Syn, it was read by Rufus Sewell.
