= Doctor Syn on the High Seas =

Novel by Russell Thorndike

- First edition
- Author: Russell Thorndike
- Language: English
- Series: Doctor Syn
- Genre: Novel
- Publisher: Rich & Cowan
- Publication date: 1936

Doctor Syn on the High Seas is the second in the series of Doctor Syn novels by Russell Thorndike. Published in 1936, it is chronologically the first novel in the series, followed by Doctor Syn Returns, though it was the fourth in terms of publication.

== Plot ==
Set in 1754. A young clergyman, Christopher Syn, loses his wife to a seducer. He embarks on a quest of vengeance, taking on the identity of the pirate Captain Clegg to hunt them down over the course of many years.

The book ends with Syn returning to his home of Dymchurch in 1775, resuming his life as a vicar.

== Critical reception ==
The novel was anticipated by Thorndike's fans, according to The Liverpool Echo, which praised it as a "salt breath of Channel air". "Stirring stuff," said the Evening Express critic, who described the character as overstuffed but popular. The Kentish Express found it enjoyable but improbable.

== Publication ==
Originally published by Rich & Cowan in 1936, it has been reprinted many times in both hardcover and paperback editions, including by Cherry Tree Books (1938), Arrow Books (1959), Panther (1964), Jarrolds (1966), Ballantine Books (1973) and other more recent small presses. It is dedicated to John Buchan.

== In other media ==
In 2006, an abridged version of the novel was broadcast on BBC Radio 4. Comprising half of a ten-part series titled Doctor Syn, it was read by Rufus Sewell.

Peter Cushing, in preparation for his role in the 1962 film Captain Clegg, read several Thorndike novels, including Doctor Syn on the High Seas. The novel's description of Syn's hair turning white inspired Cushing's on-screen appearance.
