= The Shadow of Doctor Syn =

1944 novel by Russell Thorndike

First edition (publ. Rich & Cowan)

Shadow of Doctor Syn is the seventh and last in the series of Doctor Syn novels by Russell Thorndike. Published in 1944, it follows the events of Amazing Quest of Doctor Syn. Though it is the last book written in the series it acts as a prequel for the first novel. Thorndike dedicated it to Emma Treckman, with whom he co-wrote the stage play The Return of Doctor Syn.

== Plot ==
Set in 1793 during the events of the French Revolution, Syn travels to France amidst the Reign of Terror. He has fallen in love with young Cicily Cobtree and hopes his actions against Robespierre will earn him a pardon from the King. When Cicily dies, Syn gives up his ideas of pardon and nearly loses his sanity. This sets the stage for the fiendish character he becomes in Doctor Syn: A Tale of the Romney Marsh.

== Critical reception ==
Critics praised the exciting story but the sudden romantic subplot was less favorably received.

== Publication ==
Originally published by Rich & Cowan in 1944, it has been reprinted many times, including by Arrow Books (1959), Jarrolds (1966) and other recent small presses.

== Adaptations ==
In 1989, the novel was adapted into a stage play by Philip Dart. Produced by the Channel Theatre Company, the traveling production performed in numerous locations in England.

In 2007, an abridged version of the novel was broadcast on BBC Radio 4. Comprising half of a ten-part series titled The Further Adventures of Doctor Syn, it was read by Rufus Sewell.
