= Doctor Syn: A Tale of the Romney Marsh =

1915 novel by Russell Thorndike

- Author: Russell Thorndike
- Language: English
- Series: Doctor Syn
- Genre: Historical novel
- Publisher: Thomas Nelson & Sons
- Publication date: July 1915
- Publication place: United Kingdom
- Media type: Print (hardback & paperback)
- Followed by: Doctor Syn on the High Seas
- Text: Doctor Syn: A Tale of the Romney Marsh at Wikisource

Doctor Syn: A Tale of the Romney Marsh is the first novel by Russell Thorndike. Published by Thomas Nelson & Sons in 1915, it tells the story of Doctor Christopher Syn, a parson turned smuggler with a dark past. It was a major success, spawning six further books in the series as well as stage plays and other adaptations. Although published first, within the chronology of the series, it takes place last.

== Development ==
Doctor Syn's origins began in Spartanburg, South Carolina. On May 12, 1906, at around 10 p.m., a boy named Ube V. Millican killed his stepfather P.L. Cannon in retaliation against Cannon's abuse of his sister and mother. Millican shot Cannon once in the back and the bullet lodged the brick wall behind him. The man fell dead in the doorway of the Palm Cafe, where the body lay overnight. Above the cafe, which was part of the Spartan Inn, lodged Russell Thorndike and his sister Sybil Thorndike, in town as part of the Ben Greet theatre company. That weekend, the company had performed As You Like It. Inspired by the gruesome death below their window, the siblings stayed up all night as Thorndike began to formulate the character of a parson turned smuggler.

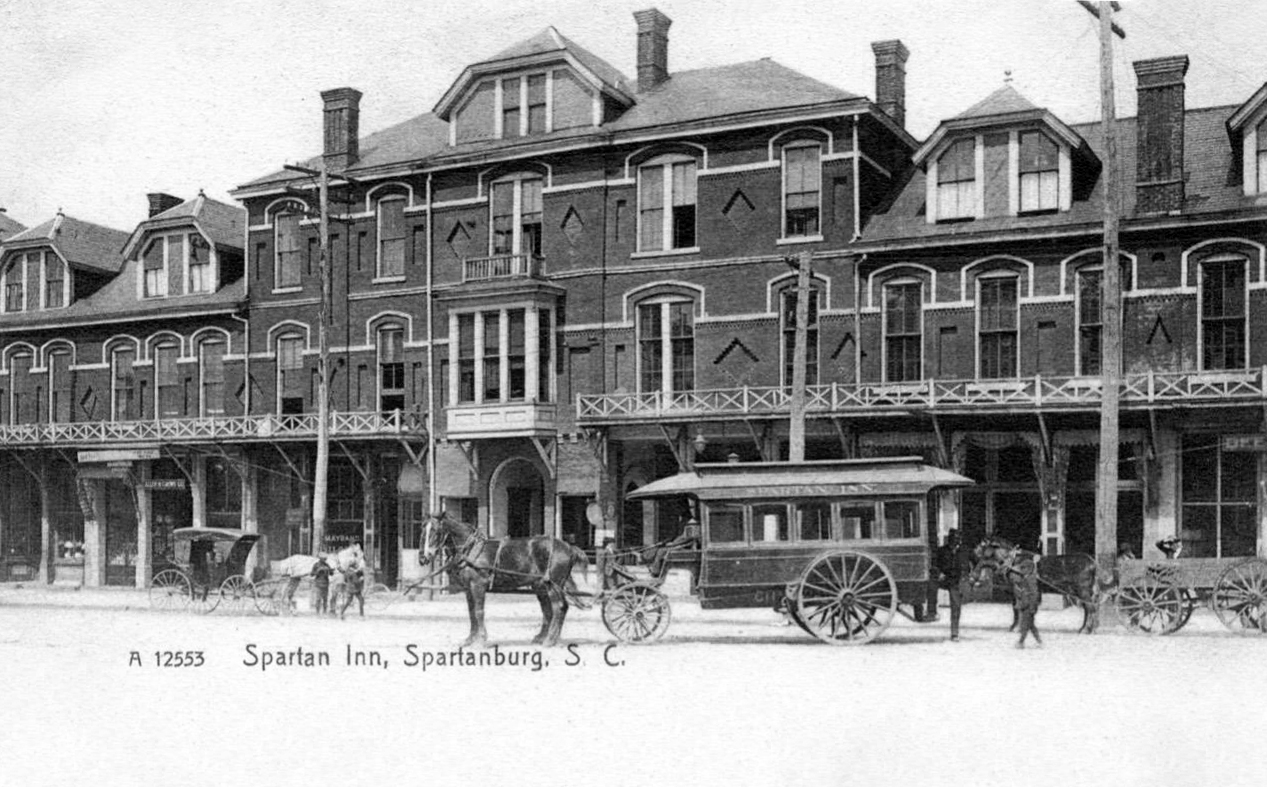
The Spartan Inn in 1905, where the idea for Doctor Syn was born. It burned down in 1910.

In her introduction to the published novel, Sybil Thorndike said she could not recall if the story began as a play or as a novel, though the theatrical version was the first to be presented to the public. In April 1910, five years before the novel's publication, Russell Thorndike performed the title role of his play Doctor Syn at the Maidstone Corn Exchange. "An ambitious, cleverly written and intensely dramatic work," according to the Kent Messenger, which also praised his acting, in the role of Syn/Clegg, as well as the sexton Mipps. The production was poorly attended. That year also saw the production of another play by Thorndike based on Kent history, The Guest at the Moat in August.

Thorndike had finished the novel version of the story by the time he was mobilized with the First Westminster Dragoons in 1914. He was reported as serving in Cairo in May 1915, when the novel was published in the UK and in the United States. Wounded in Gallipoli, he left the army and returned to the theatre.

== Plot ==
Doctor Christopher Syn, the parson of Dymchurch, leads a double life. By day, a mild mannered man of the cloth. By night, the leader of a gang of smugglers, via his alter ego, the masked Scarecrow. But this equilibrium is disrupted by Captain Collyer, a tenacious revenue officer charged with breaking the Romney smuggling operation. And at the same time, a member of Syn's old pirate crew arrives in town, one of the last living witnesses to Syn's true identity as the notorious pirate, Captain Clegg.

== Critical reception ==
The novel was a commercial success and received widespread acclaim as a work of popular fiction. The Sun dubbed it entertaining, albeit with a loose plot construction. The Sunday Times compared it to R. M. Ballantyne and Frederick Marryat. Critics generally praised the exciting though incredible plot and compared it favorably to Treasure Island. The Chronicle, among others, suggested it would be a good present for schoolboys. The Yorkshire Post reviewed the novel favorably but criticized the "lighter touch" moments that descended into caricature. The Standard lauded the robust characters and personalities found within the story, especially the titular parson and the young Jerry Jerk. "It is a real pleasure to have such a frankly bloodthirsty, romantic, piratical smuggling story," according to the Manchester Courier.

Overseas, it was also critically well-received. It was published in the United States on 26 February 1915 by Doubleday, Page & Company, followed by numerous reprints and reissues across several countries. Later publishers include Rich & Cowan, Cherry Tree Books (1938), Arrow Books (1959), Panther (1964), Jarrolds (1966), Ballantine Books (1973) and other more recent small presses.

== Adaptations ==
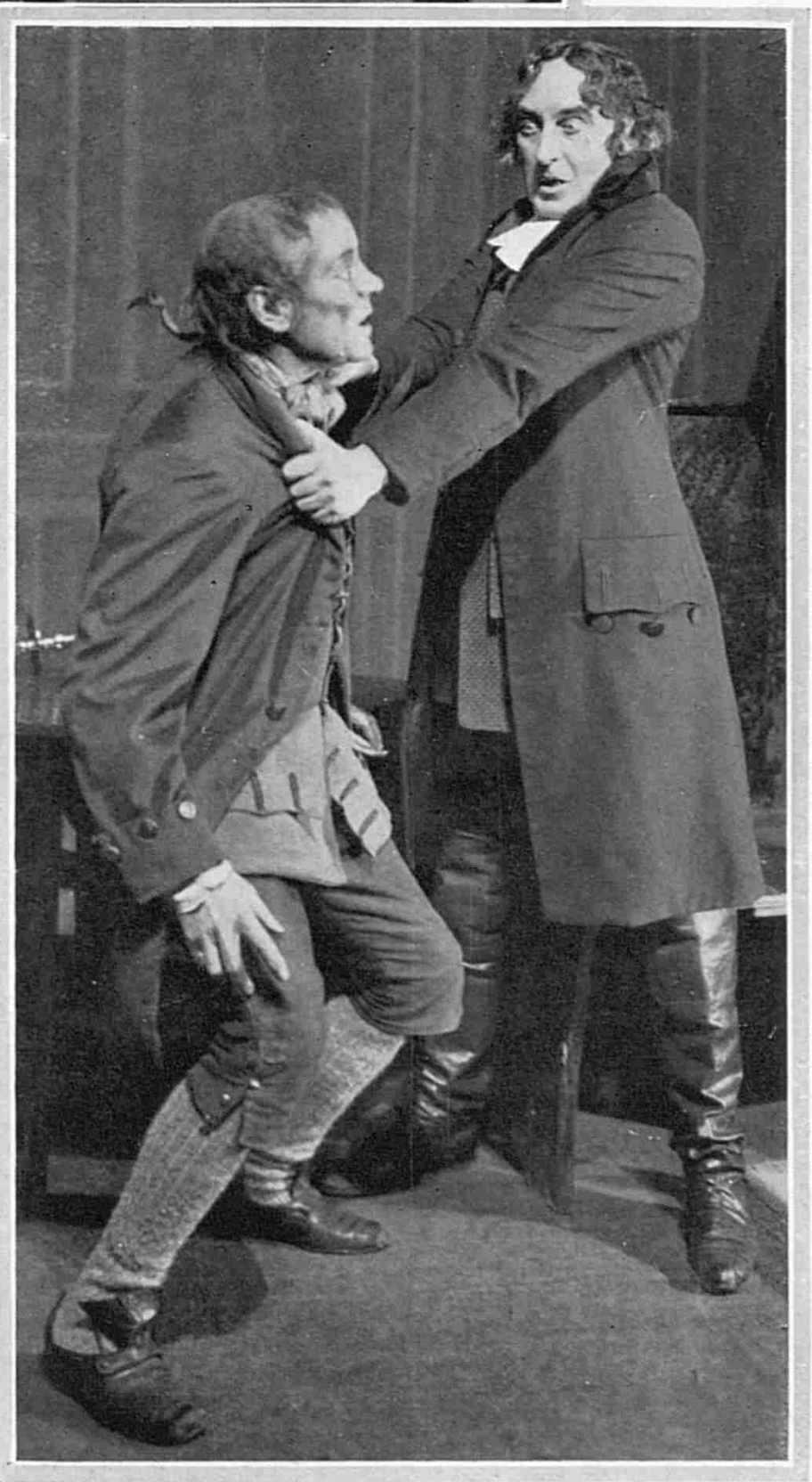
Tom Reynolds as Mipps (left) and Russell Thorndike (right) as Doctor Syn in the 1927 production at The Strand Theatre

After the success of the novel, Thorndike returned to the stage. Although the story debuted as a stage play in 1910, it wasn't until October 1925 that a theatrical version reappeared, with a one-night engagement at Wyndham's Theatre. Authorship was credited to Thorndike and Ivan Firth, with Thorndike in the title role. A few months later, Thorndike launched a provincial tour of the play, re-staged, with film actress Alma Taylor. The production performed throughout the UK and opened at the Strand Theatre in 1927, with Florence McHugh replacing Taylor and with Tom Reynolds as Mipps. In 1928 young Robert Morley joined the cast on another tour of the show, his first professional role. Later productions were credited solely to Thorndike and produced by the author; he continued to perform the title role for many years. In 1937, George Arliss starred in a film adaptation.

== Legacy ==
The success of Thorndike's novel led to a long career in fiction. Having killed off his eponymous character at the end of the novel, Thorndike wrote a series of six prequel novels between 1935 and 1944.The popularity of the character endures, with adaptations in film, theatre and television, annual live events, and references in comic books and other media.
