= Doctor Syn (film) =

1937 British film by Roy William Neill

- DVD-R cover
- Directed by: Roy William Neill; Maude T. Howell (asst.)
- Written by: Roger Burford; Michael Hogan
- Based on: Doctor Syn: A Tale of the Romney Marsh by Russell Thorndike
- Produced by: Michael Balcon; Edward Black
- Starring: George Arliss; Margaret Lockwood; John Loder
- Cinematography: Jack E. Cox
- Edited by: R. E. Dearing
- Music by: Louis Levy; Hugh Bath; Jack Beaver
- Production company: Gainsborough Pictures
- Release dates: 25 August 1937 (U.K.); 14 November 1937 (U.S.)
- Running time: 80 minutes
- Country: United Kingdom
- Language: English

Doctor Syn (Dr. Syn in the United States) is a 1937 British black-and-white historical dramatic adventure film, directed by Roy William Neill for Gainsborough Pictures. It stars George Arliss (in his last film), Margaret Lockwood, Graham Moffatt, and Ronald Shiner. The film is based on the Doctor Syn novels of Russell Thorndike, set in 18th-century Kent. The character of Syn and the events at the film's climax were both softened considerably in comparison to Thorndike's original storyline.

== Plot ==
In 1800, a detachment of Royal Navy tax revenue collectors led by Captain Collyer arrive in the village of Dymchurch on Romney Marsh. The area is known for liquor-smuggling, and they are on the trail of the culprits. They find a peaceful village of apparently honest, pious and simple folk, looked after benevolently by Squire Cobtree and the philanthropic vicar Doctor Syn.

Dr. Syn is in fact The Scarecrow, the leader of the band of parish smugglers. He uses his cover as a man of the cloth to run a profitable smuggling ring, whose profits are used to improve the lives of the local citizenry by paying the heavy tax burden imposed by the Crown. Collyer gradually comes to suspect what is going on, after which a series of chases and confrontations takes place. The Scarecrow and his smugglers narrowly outwit their Royal Navy pursuers on the surrounding marshlands.

Captain Collyer finally discovers that Syn is none other than the notorious pirate Captain Clegg, thought to have been hanged many years earlier and buried in the graveyard at Dymchurch. Still one step ahead of Collyer and his men, Syn destroys all incriminating evidence, after which he and his smugglers disappear, making their escape from England by merchant ship.

== Cast ==
- George Arliss as Doctor Syn
- Margaret Lockwood as Imogene Clegg
- John Loder as Denis Cobtree
- Roy Emerton as Captain Howard Collyer
- Graham Moffatt as Jerry Jerk
- George Merritt as Mipps
- Athole Stewart as Squire Cobtree
- Frederick Burtwell as Rash
- Wilson Coleman as Dr. Pepper
- Wally Patch as Bo'sun
- Muriel George as Mrs. Waggetts
- Meinhart Maur as Mulatto
- Alan Whittaker (uncredited double for George Arliss in some scenes)

== Production ==
This was the last film of George Arliss' contract with Gaumont British. According to Arliss: "He is a quite good parson and there is virtue even in his smuggling. I think we can make him quite an amusing character, and the subject is picturesque and dramatic". Although well into his sixties, Arliss was very energetic in the title role.

The film was announced in April, taking place at Gaumont British's studio at Islington. There was some location work in Dymchurch and the marshes around Rye and Winchelsea.

Anna Lee was to play the female lead. She was replaced by Margaret Lockwood who impressed with her performance so much she was offered a three-year contract by Gainsborough Pictures. This was a key turning point in Lockwood's career.

== Reception ==
Kinematograph Weekly reported the film as a "runner up" at the British box office in February 1938.

== Music ==
There are two songs used in the film:

- "Heavenly Home" (hymn sung by congregation in the opening church scene)
- "Come Landlord fill the Flowing Bowl" (traditional drinking song)

== Home media ==
Dr. Syn was released in the U.S. in VHS format by Timeless Multimedia in 1994 and by Video Classics, Inc. in 2010. It was released as a public domain Region 1 DVD-R in 2014. A regular DVD version was released by Reel Vault Studios in 2015 and by DigiComTV in 2021. The film has yet to be released in Blu-ray format.
