= Adam Pounds =

British composer

Adam Pounds (born 25 November 1954) is a British composer and conductor, mostly active in Cambridge.

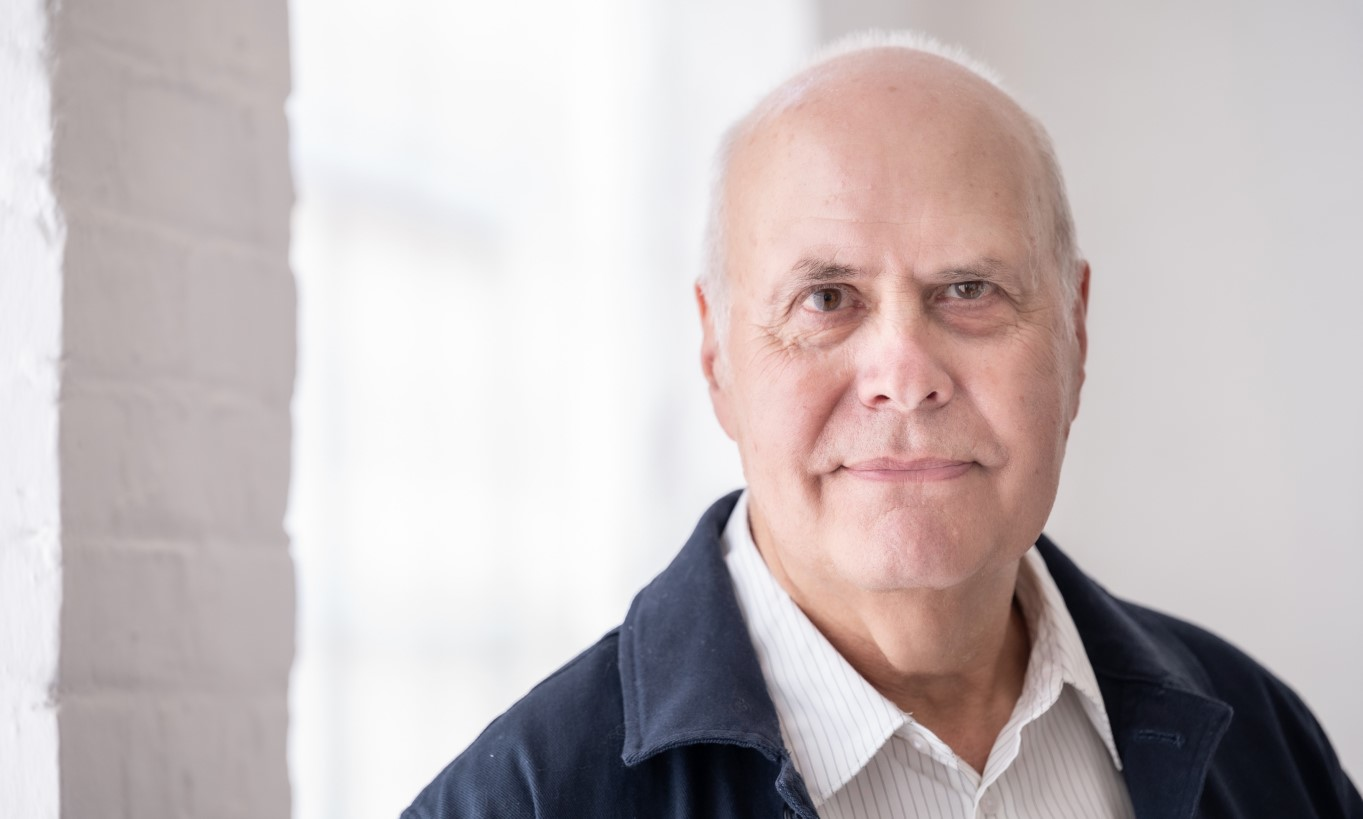
Adam Pounds (September 2023)

== Biography ==
Adam Pounds is the first living British composer recorded by the Sinfonia of London and its conductor, John Wilson. Born in Walthamstow, in London, to Edward Pounds and Annie Pounds (née Crisp)., he moved to Cambridge with his wife, Dinah Pounds, and their two children, in 2000.

=== Education ===
As a child, Pounds was a chorister at St Michael's Church, in Walthamstow. Educated at William Morris High School, he was accepted to the London College of Music where he studied oboe, guitar, composition and conducting, the latter under Christopher Fry. His oboe quartet won the Lillian Hunt Memorial prize for composition. Pounds later took private composition lessons from Lennox Berkeley, to whom he had sent the prize-winning oboe quartet by way of introduction.

Pounds continued his studies at Goldsmiths' College, graduating with a BMus (Hons) degree. In 2002, Pounds began studying for a MEd at Trinity Hall, Cambridge, where his research focused on the decline of classical music provision in state schools. During his studies at Trinity Hall, Pounds joined the choir of Great St Mary's, the University Church.

=== Work and Musical Advocacy ===
During his studies, Pounds worked as a music copyist for the BBC, preparing parts for major works by Harrison Birtwistle, William Alwyn and others, to be performed by the BBC Symphony Orchestra, continuing this work after leaving music college. He also worked for Crescendo, a jazz magazine, as an administrative assistant, and taught at Long Road Sixth Form College.

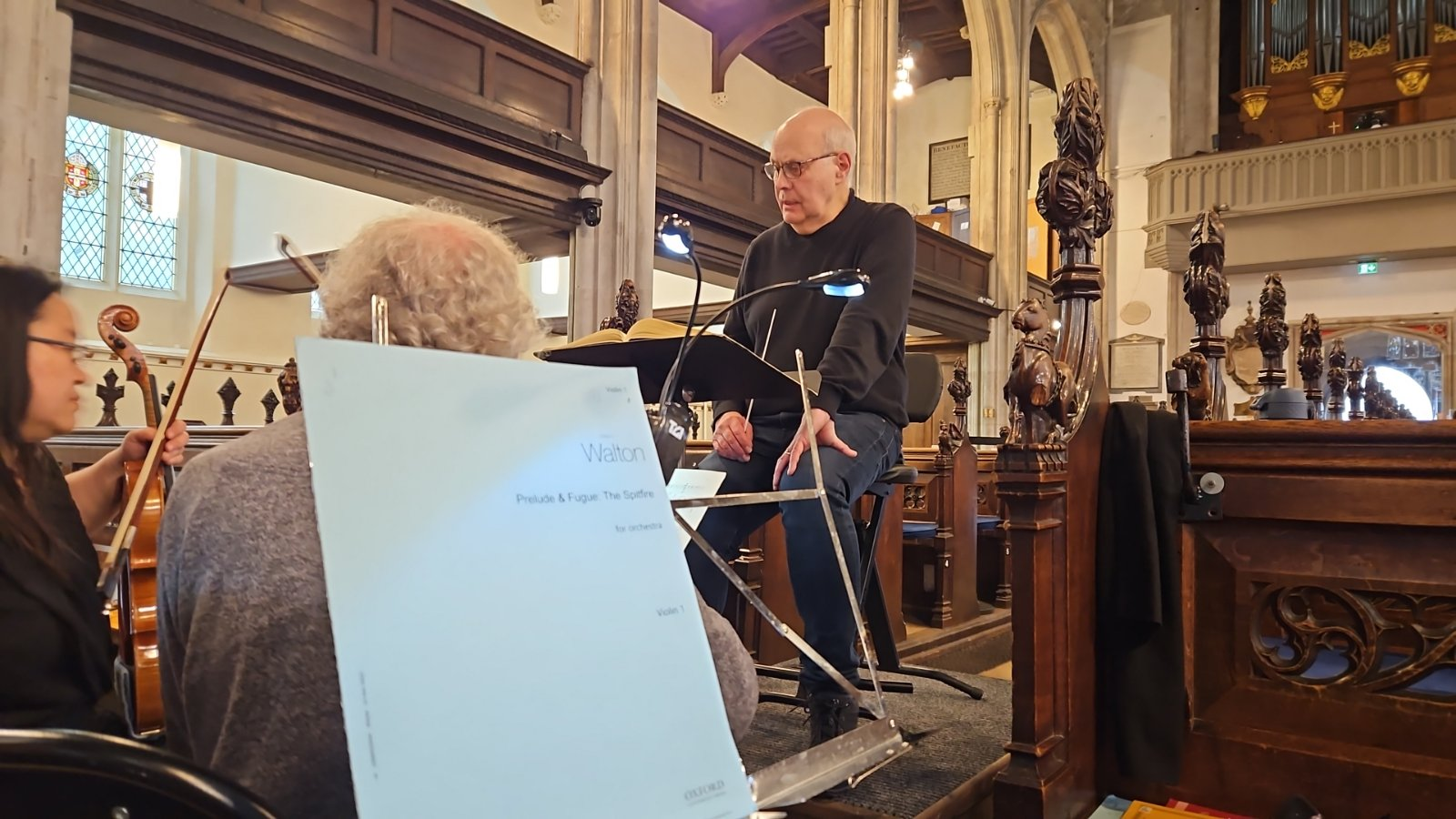
Adam Pounds conducting a rehearsal of the Academy of Great St Mary's, March 2025, Cambridge, UK

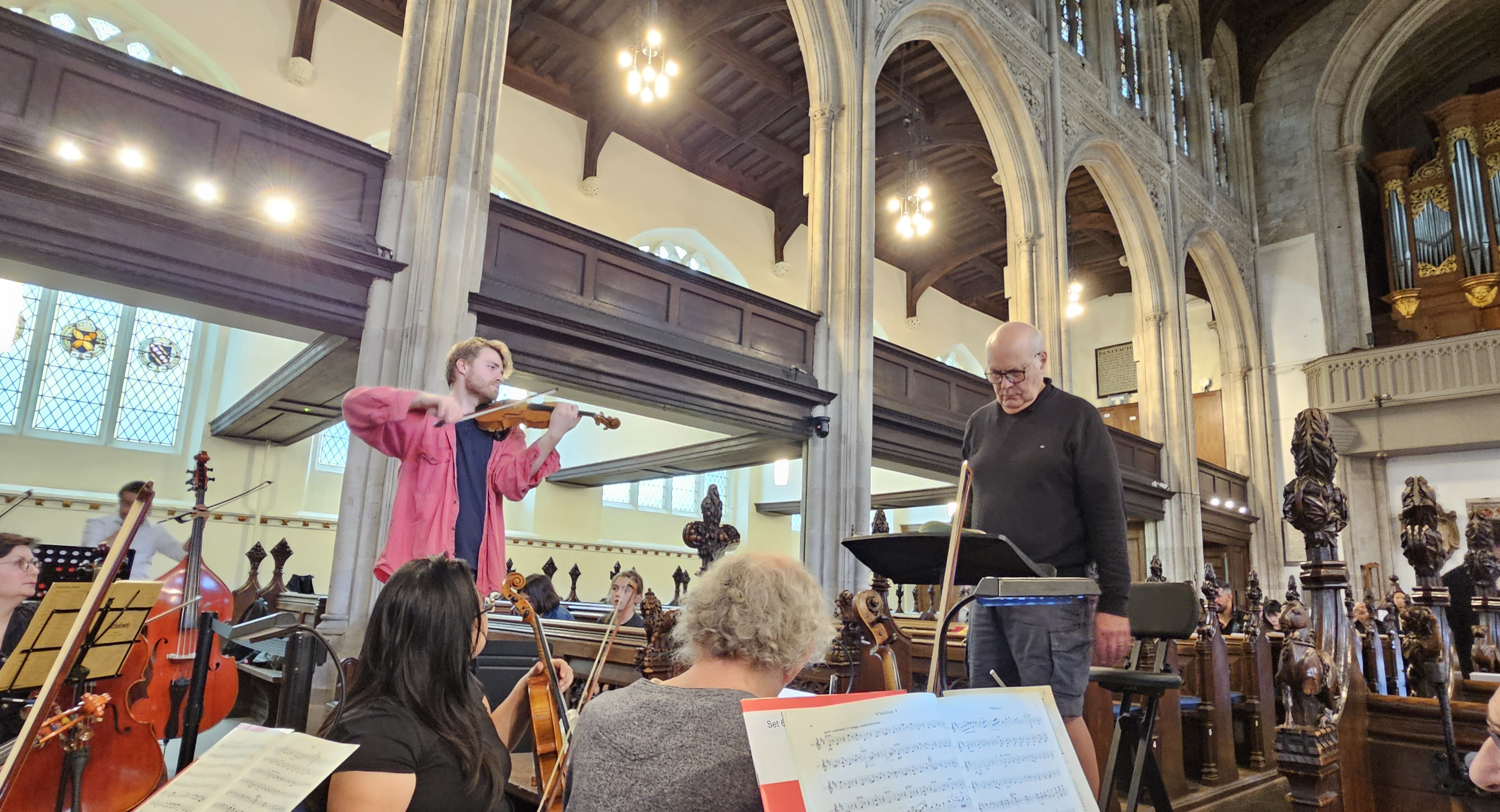
Adam Pounds conducting violinist Charlie Lovell-Jones in Tchaikovsky's Violin Concerto, September 2025, Cambridge, UK

Pounds founded and conducted the Nelson Orchestra, Waltham Forest, in 1981. He subsequently founded the Academy of Great St. Mary's at the University Church in Cambridge, where some of his later works have received their debut. Pounds also conducts the Stapleford Choral Society.

Between 2015 and 2021, then again from 2024, Pounds also served as the chairman of the Lennox Berkeley Society, which encourages the performance, study, recording and broadcast of his former tutor's work.

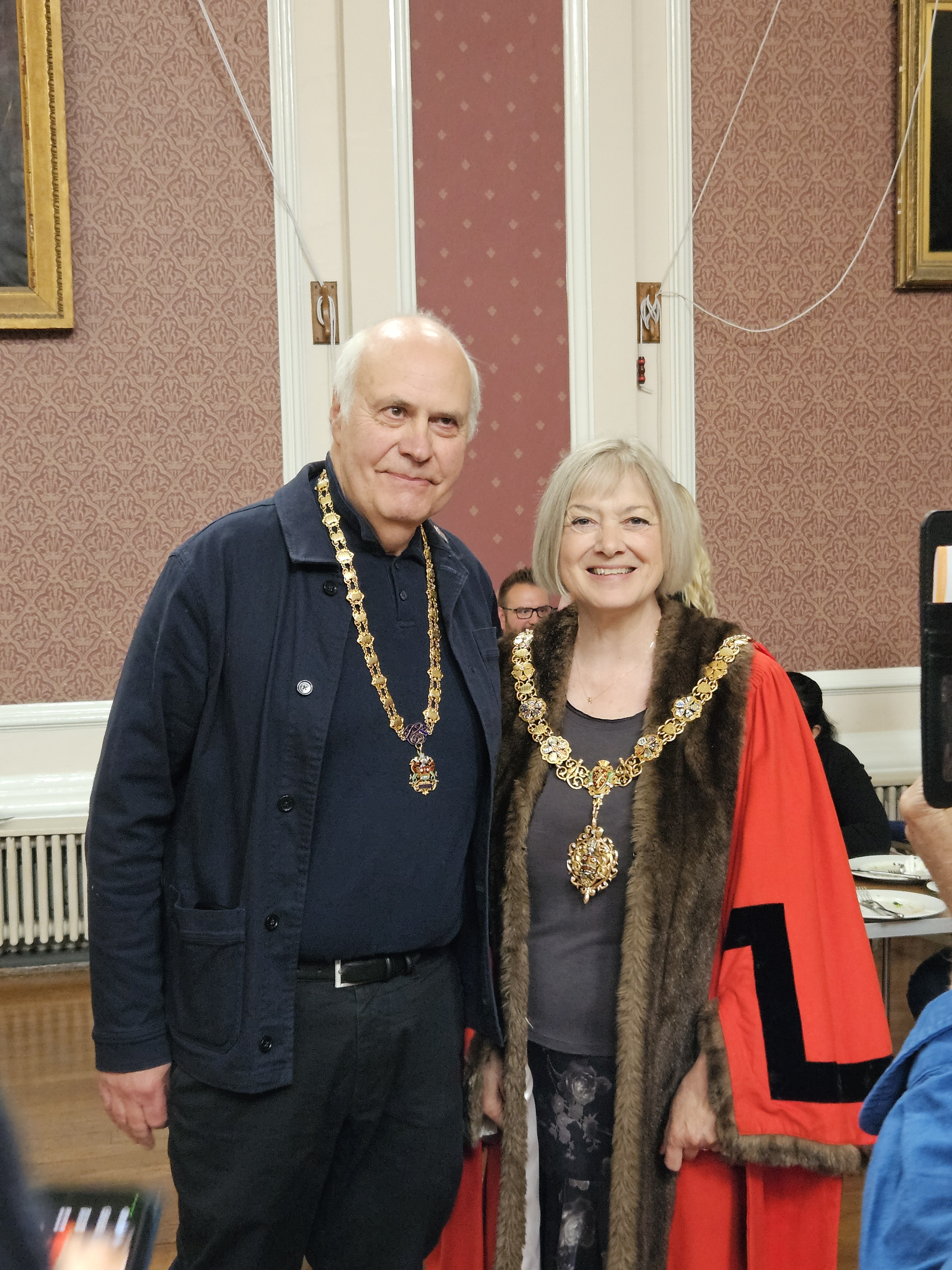
Adam Pounds (left) with Dinah Pounds at her appointment as Mayor of Cambridge, May 2025

Along with his wife, Dinah, Pounds has co-founded the Romsey Music Project, producing an ongoing series of free and accessible concerts in Romsey Town where Dinah Pounds has served as a City Councillor since 2021, as Deputy Mayor of Cambridge in 2024-25, and as Mayor of Cambridge from May 2025.

== Compositions ==
Pounds' early orchestral compositions include the Sinfonietta (1979) and the Gaelic Triptych (1983). His Festival Overture (1987) was commissioned by the Waltham Forest Arts Festival. The Violin Concerto was first performed at the Stansted Festival in 1995. Chamber works include three string quartets: No. 1 (1978); the one movement Second String Quartet (2003); and the String Quartet No. 3, completed in 2022. There are also vocal works, such as the Shakespeare Sonnets for voice, flute and piano, the London Cantata, and an opera, Syn (2005), based on Russell Thorndike's Dr Syn character. The opera has been performed at the Mumford Theatre, Cambridge.

The Martyrdom of Latimer was commissioned in 2009 to celebrate the tenth anniversary of the Ely Sinfonia. It explores the final days of the life of the cleric Hugh Latimer, his death at the stake and his martyrdom, using modal themes and liturgical ideas combined with strong rhythmic statements. It is written for a fairly large orchestra, employing four trumpet parts, with two of the players intended to be sited in a gallery. The piece was premiered in Ely Cathedral on 3 October 2009.

The London Cantata, completed in 2017, returns to Pounds' city of birth, reflecting on the historical diversity of life in the capital, set to the words of Wilfred Owen, Amy Levy, George Eliot and William Wordsworth, among others.

In 2018 Pounds continued composing a series of numbered symphonies, with Symphony No. 3 (2021) recorded in November 2022 by John Wilson and the Sinfonia of London, to whom it is dedicated, their first recording of a living British composer. Written in response to the COVID-19 lockdowns imposed in 2020 and 2021, Pounds states that the piece captures the ‘sadness, humour, determination and defiance’ which everyone faced at this time – not least musicians. Its concert premiere took place in Great St Mary's Church in Cambridge on 28 September 2024, conducted by the composer.

But it's the Symphony’s third-movement Elegy – noble, serene, spacious — that stands as the work's high point: music decidedly of the present but tapping a vein of timeless, unaffected beauty and pure expression.

— Jonathan Blumhofer, The Arts Fuse

... the music is utterly compelling, holds the attention with a glue-like grip, and thus, this issue is strongly recommended. The symphony is dedicated to John Wilson and his Sinfonia, and they repay the honour with a performance of searing conviction and intensity.

— Geoffrey Atkinson, British Music Society

The finale projects a mood of hard-won defiance, and the symphony as a whole is certainly worth experiencing – especially in a performance as scrupulously prepared and committed as this one.

— Andrew Achenbach, Gramophone magazine

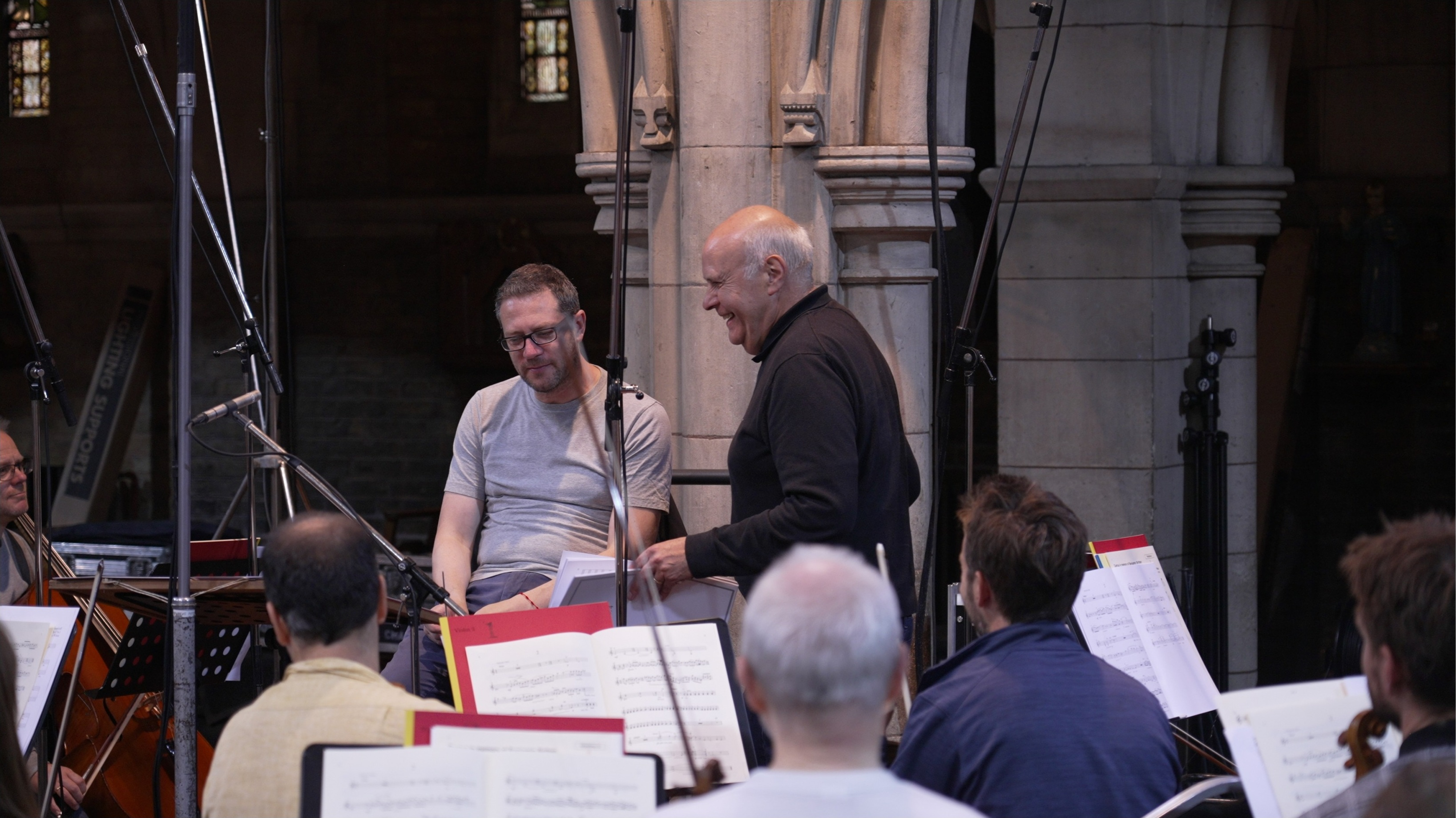
Adam Pounds with conductor John Wilson recording his Symphony No. 4, in St Augustine’s Church, London, September 2025.

The Symphony No. 4 was premiered in Cambridge on 10 December 2023,. Following the acclaim of Symphony No. 3, Pounds worked with John Wilson and the Sinfonia of London again to record Symphony No. 4 in September 2025.

Pounds' Nocturne for Choir and Orchestra was premiered on 8 December 2024.

=== Style and Influences ===
Pounds' compositional style is in the symphonic tradition, and although he has used some so-called modern methods including serialism and minimalism, he has followed a line through composers such as Shostakovich, Hindemith, Vaughan Williams and Bartók. He also gained much from his time studying with Lennox Berkeley, who advised him to 'write only the notes you need'; during this time Pounds was able to refine his form and find direction.

Pounds has drawn inspiration from his travels, writing his Gaelic Triptych after a holiday in the Scottish Highlands. Its second movement, subtitled Corgarff Castle, evokes a misty picture of a lonely and deserted garrison, while the third, subtitled Drumossie Moor, is a tribute to the Scots butchered in the Battle of Culloden, ending with an orchestration of an ancient bagpipe tune. Another programmatic work, Northern Picture, is a collage of dance, mysticism and combat, influenced by the Castlerigg stone circle.

While Pounds' earlier work, Life Cycle, shares the same idea of programme, the inspiration is far more abstract, dwelling on life's journey. The fullness of life is represented by a strong minimalist section. His String Quartet No. 2, composed in 2003, contrasts war-like themes with images of reason and meditation. Pounds describes that, although he had always been involved with the Church of England, he went through a "political and hot-headed" period; this piece was written as he was returning to religion.

More recently, Pounds' Symphony No. 3 (2021) expresses the composer's various emotional reactions to the impact and psychological effects of the COVID-19 lockdowns.

Regarding his time in the choir of Great St Mary's Church, Pounds has described his choral experience as beneficial to his work as a musician, explaining that "when you’re arranging instrumentation and conducting, it's important to understand choir and orchestra together".

In addition to the poems set in the London Cantata, Pounds' vocal works include settings of poems by William Blake, G. K. Chesterton and W. B. Yeats.

=== List of works ===
==== Orchestral ====
- Symphony No. 4 (2023)
- Symphony No. 3 (2021)
- Symphony No. 2 (2019)
- Interludes from Syn (2005)
- Flute Concertino (1999)
- Northern Picture (1993)
- Life Cycle (1992)
- Violin Concerto (1989)
- Festival Overture (1987)
- Symphony No. 1 (1985)
- Gaelic Triptych (1981)
- Sinfonietta (1979)
- The Martyrdom of Latimer (2009)

==== Chamber ====
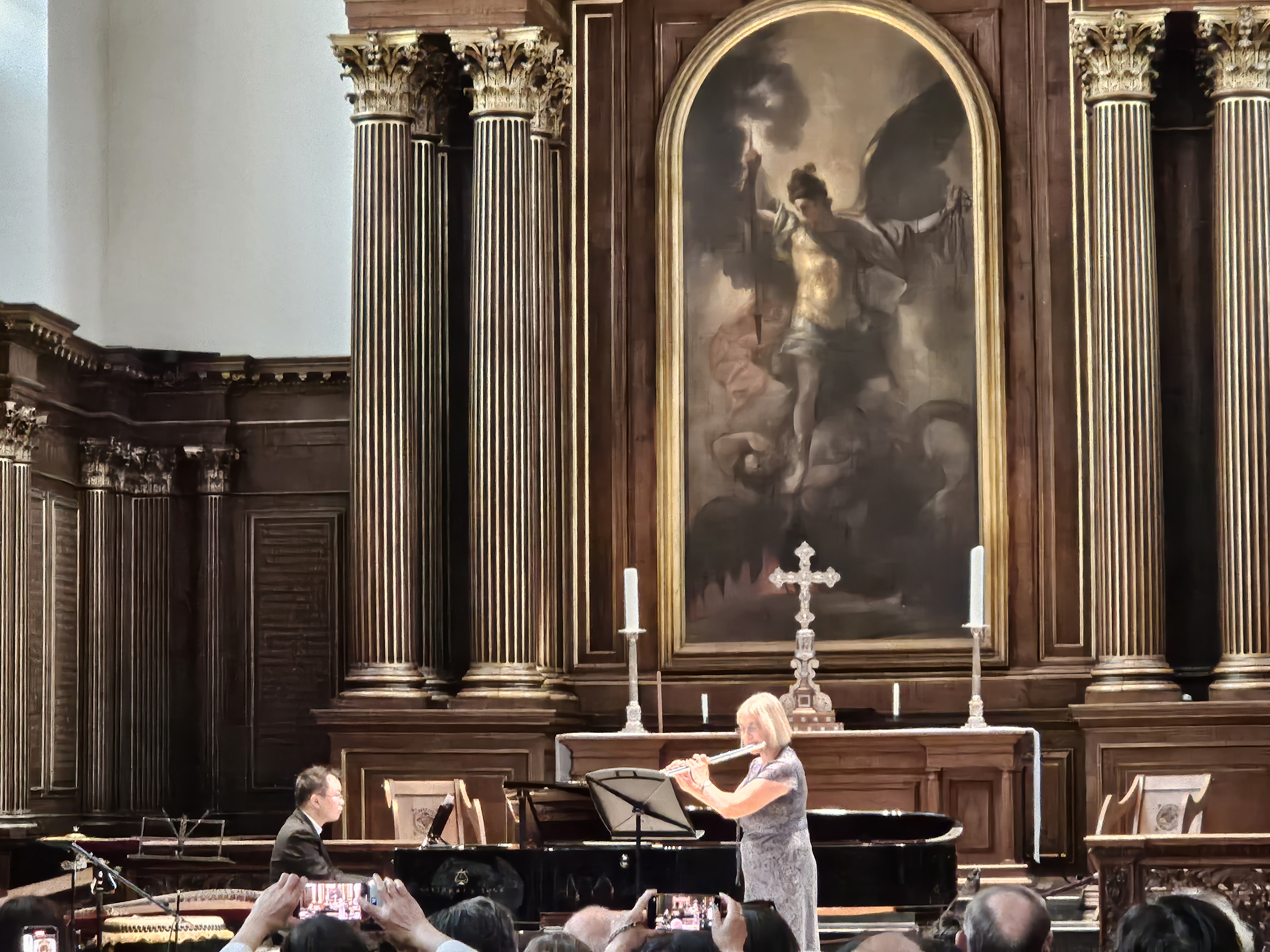
Dinah Pounds (flute) and Li Jinfeng (piano) performing the Flute Sonata in Trinity College, Cambridge, for the Cambridge Chinese Music & Culture Festival 2025

- Sonata for Flute and Piano (2020)
- Clarinet Quintet (2013)
- Sextet (2012)
- String Quartet No. 2 (2003)
- A Prelude to Bach (for organ) (1997)
- Sonata for Violin and Piano (1986)
- Wind Quintet (1984)

==== Vocal ====
- Nocturne for Choir and Orchestra (2024)
- Dreams (2018)
- London Cantata (2016, rev. 2023)
- Veni, Redemptor Gentium (2016)
- Behold, the Great Creator Makes (2012)
- Time (2011)
- The Christ-Child (2011)
- Christmas Evocation (2008)
- A Cradle Song (2007)

==== Opera ====
- Syn (2005)

=== Discography ===
- Shostakovich String Quartet No. 3, Barber, Pounds String Quartets (2005)
- The Nelson Orchestra 25th Anniversary Recording (Walton, Pounds, Vaughan Williams) (2006)
- Magnificat - Christmas from Cambridge (2007)
- Resurrection (2011)
- Entr'acte (2013)
- London Cantata (2016)
- Symphony (2018)
- Time (2018)
- Sonata (2020)
- Ravel / Berkeley / Pounds: Orchestra Works (2024)
