= The Master of the Macabre =

1947 novel by Russell Thorndike

- First edition cover
- Author: Russell Thorndike
- Publisher: Rich & Cowan
- Publication date: 1947

The Master of the Macabre is a novel by British writer Russell Thorndike. First published in 1947 by Rich & Cowan, it was critically well-received and was his penultimate novel. It consists of a series of short stories woven together by a framing mechanism.

The novel was republished in 2013 by Valancourt Books, with its original cover art and an introduction by Mark Valentine.

== Plot ==
Thriller writer Tayler Kent, caught in a blizzard en route to his Romney Marsh cottage, stops to deliver a package to Charles Hogarth, a mysterious collector of supernatural stories and strange ephemera that has earned him the moniker "the Master of the Macabre". Nursing an injury from a car crash, Kent stays with Hogarth in his decrepit home, a haunted former monastery. He witnesses supernatural occurrences as Hogarth relates a series of stories illustrating his unique collection of macabre items.

== Critical reception ==
Thorndike was most well known as the creator of the Doctor Syn novels. Critics viewed The Master of the Macabre as an extension of his work as a writer of thrillers, and the phrase had been used to describe him in previous works. Some critics noted the "Arabian Nights" style of structure, "well-written in more than one sense of the term."

The Sphere called it "extraordinary", with other critics also praising the suspenseful, supernatural-laden stories.

The Middlesex Independent and West London Star observed that the novel went farther than Thorndike's Syn novels, moving into different and more extreme types of horror and grotesqueries.

The Evening Herald was less favorable, citing M.R. James and Sheridan Le Fanu as setting a higher standard for the genre. E. F. Bleiler said simply "a hodge podge."

In Fantasy Review, Thorndike's stories were deemed "well told" and entertaining, but too directly lurid. In a post-war time of austerity, the copious food and drink consumed by the characters lacked believability.

In his introduction to the 2013 reissue by Valancourt Books, Mark Valentine compares the structure of the novel to New Arabian Nights by Robert Louis Stevenson and Arthur Machen's The Three Impostors. He describes the style favorably in the tradition of Algernon Blackwood and William Hope Hodgson, who created earlier supernatural detectives.
