= Yvonne Romain =

British film and TV actress

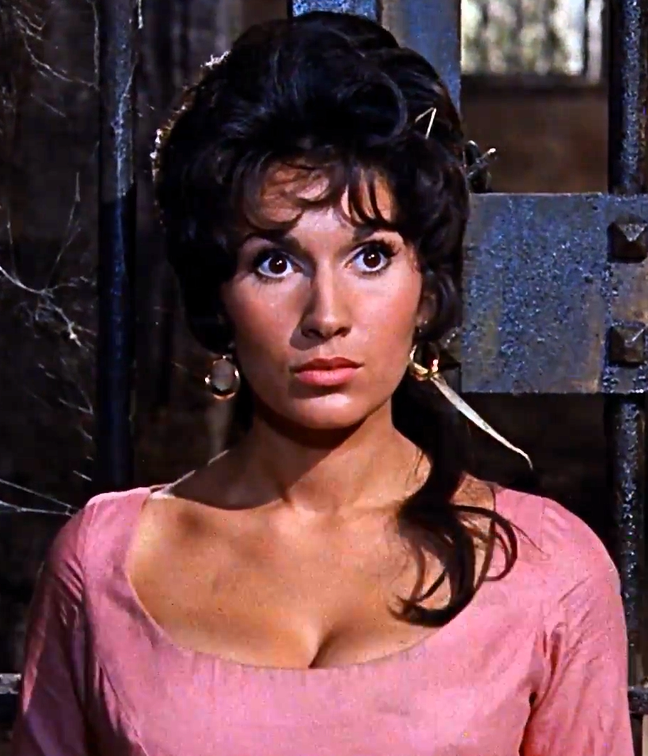
- Romain in The Curse of the Werewolf (1961)
- Born: Yvonne Adelaide Warren; 17 February 1938 (age 88); London, England
- Education: Italia Conti Academy
- Occupation: Actress
- Years active: 1958–1973
- Known for: Hammer Films
- Spouse: Leslie Bricusse (m. 1958; died 2021)

Yvonne Adelaide "Evie" Romain (née Warren; 17 February 1938) is a British retired film and television actress, active mostly in the late 1950s and 1960s.

== Early career ==
Romain was born in London to a family of Maltese descent. From the age of twelve she appeared in children's shows and repertory, and later graduated from the Italia Conti Academy. She started appearing in British films in her late teens. Her exotic, dark looks and 38-22-36 figure saw her often cast in supporting roles as Italian or Spanish maidens in war films and comedies.

She is perhaps most remembered for her roles in numerous British horror films. She appeared in Corridors of Blood (1958), where she starred alongside Boris Karloff and Christopher Lee, and in Circus of Horrors (1960). She also starred in the later Devil Doll (1964).

Romain is probably best known for The Curse of the Werewolf (1961) where she starred with Oliver Reed in his first major role. Romain plays a mute servant girl who spurns the advances of the sadistic marqués. Hammer Films' publicity stills for the movie capitalised on Romain's appearance by having her photographed in typical 'scream queen' poses alongside a made-up Reed, despite she and Reed sharing no actual screen time.

Her probable biggest role was in another Hammer production, Captain Clegg (1962), a.k.a. Night Creatures (US title), playing alongside Peter Cushing and Oliver Reed again, this time as his fiancée. She also appeared alongside Sean Connery twice, in Action of the Tiger (1957), and the gangster film The Frightened City (1961), where she shared equal billing with the pre-Bond star. Romain also co-starred in the Danger Man episode titled Sabotage in 1961, and in the 1964 mystery film Smokescreen alongside Peter Vaughan.

Oliver Reed was Romain's most frequent co-star. The two appeared together again in an episode of The Saint (Season 2, Episode 9 'The King of the Beggars'), and for a fourth and final time in The Brigand of Kandahar (1965). Credited as 'Yvonne Warren', she played the second sister in the episode "Sir Bliant" of the TV series The Adventures of Sir Lancelot.

Romain auditioned for the part of Jill Masterson in the James Bond film Goldfinger, a role that ultimately went to Shirley Eaton.

== Later career ==
Romain moved to Los Angeles and starred alongside Ann-Margret in The Swinger (1966), and Elvis Presley in Double Trouble (1967), which she herself called a 'dreadful film', though she enjoyed the experience.

After a break from the screen, Romain emerged from semi-retirement as the title character in the Anthony Perkins/Stephen Sondheim-scripted mystery thriller The Last of Sheila (1973), her final screen role before leaving the industry. "I was in my prime," she told The Daily Telegraph in 2021. "But with the success of my husband and all of that going on, we were living the life in New York and LA and having far too good a time. So many films you're taken off to do three months here, three months there, in different countries, so it just didn't work for me. So it had to go. Of course it's sad, but you can't have everything."

== Personal life ==
In 1958, Romain married composer Leslie Bricusse. He composed musicals (including Stop the World I Want to Get Off, Scrooge, and Willy Wonka and the Chocolate Factory) and was also the lyricist for the titular James Bond film songs "Goldfinger" and "You Only Live Twice". They lived in the South of France and were married for 63 years until Bricusse's death in 2021.

== Filmography ==
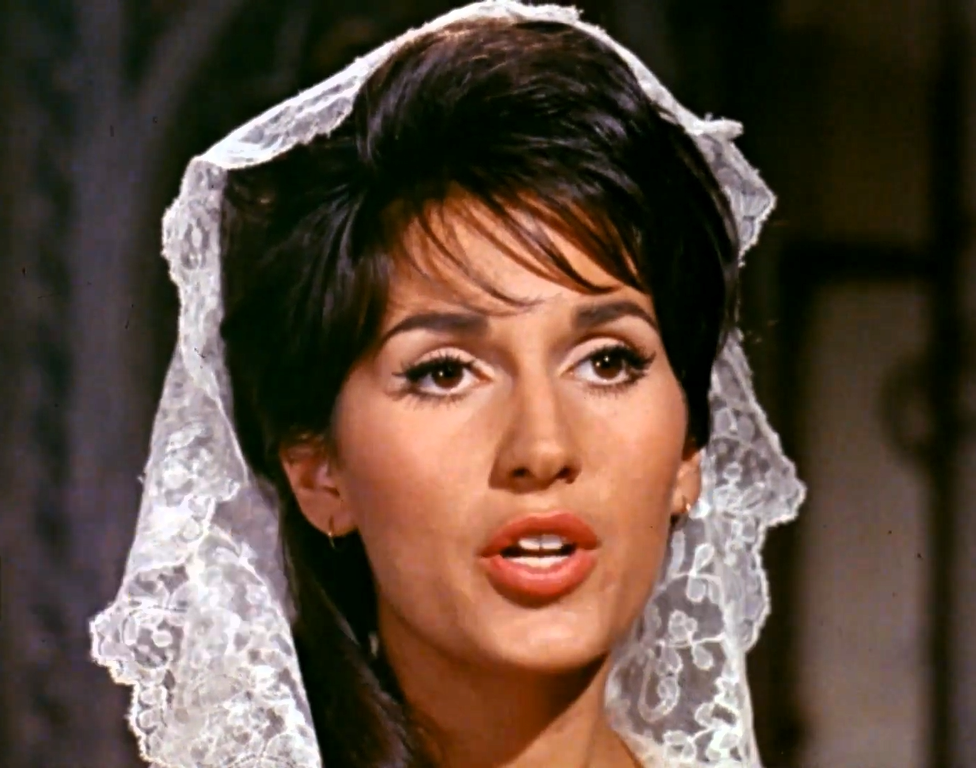
Romain as Imogène in the 1962 film Captain Clegg

Year	Title	Role	Notes
1956	The Baby and the Battleship	Italian Girl	Uncredited
1956	House of Secrets		Uncredited
1957	Interpol		Uncredited
1957	Murder Reported	Betty	
1957	Action of the Tiger	Katina	
1957	Seven Thunders	Minor Role	Uncredited
1957	A King in New York	Older Girl	
1958	The Silent Enemy	Spanish Girl	Uncredited
1958	Corridors of Blood	Rosa	
1960	Circus of Horrors	Melina	
1961	The Curse of the Werewolf	Servant Girl	
1961	The Frightened City	Anya	
1962	Village of Daughters	Annunziata Gastoni	
1962	Captain Clegg	Imogene – serving wench	
1963	Return to Sender	Lisa	
1964	Devil Doll	Marianne Horn	
1964	Smokescreen	Janet Dexter	
1965	The Brigand of Kandahar	Ratina	
1966	The Swinger	Karen Charles	
1967	Double Trouble	Claire Dunham	
1973	The Last of Sheila	Sheila Green	(final film role)
