= Doctor Syn =

Fictional character from novels by Russell Thorndike

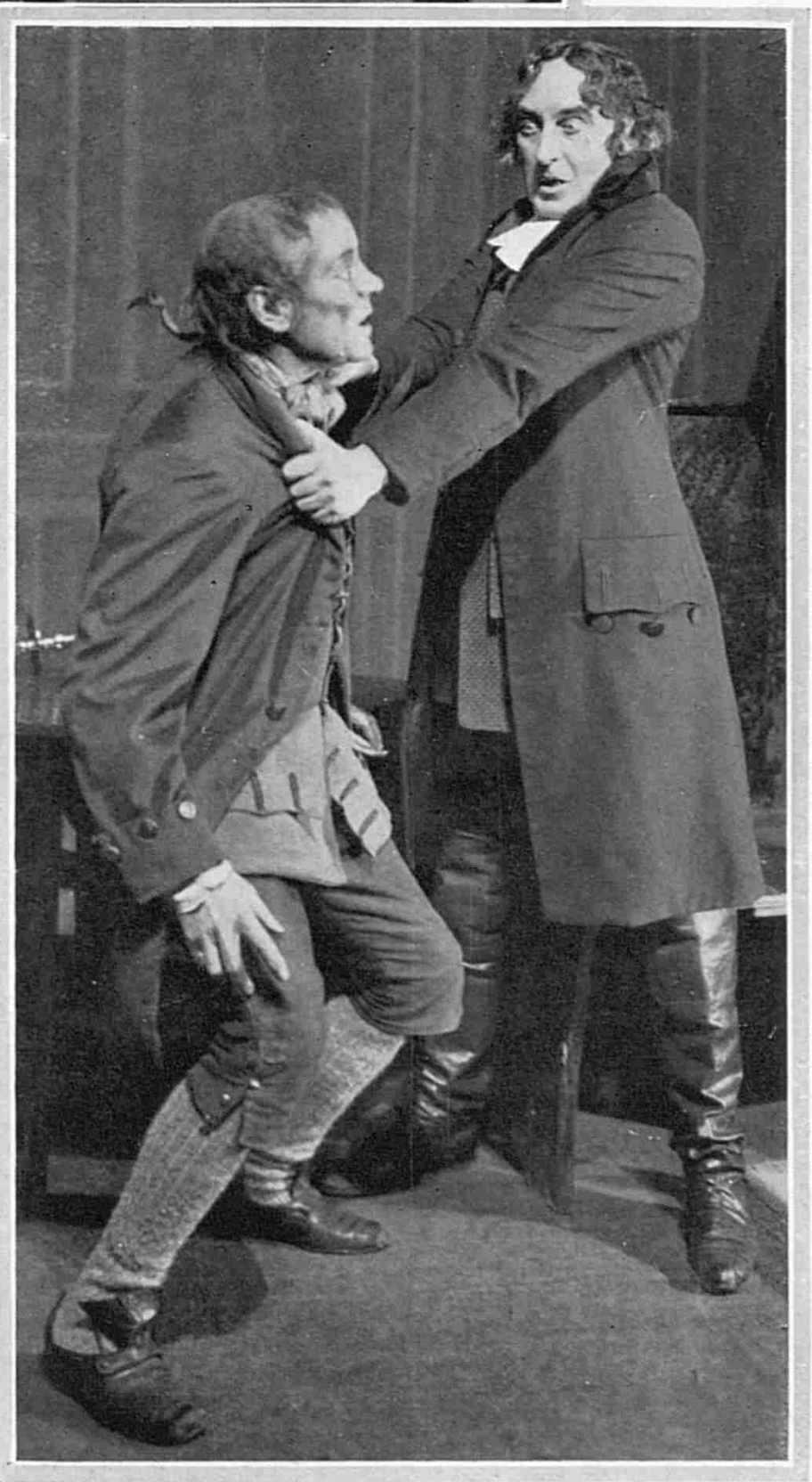
- Russell Thorndike (right) as Syn with Tom Reynolds as Mipps in the 1927 production of Dr. Syn at The Strand Theatre
- First appearance: Play: Dr. Syn (1910); Novel: Doctor Syn: A Tale of the Romney Marsh (1915)
- Last appearance: Novel: Shadow of Doctor Syn (1944); Play: The Return of Dr. Syn (1947)
- Created by: Russell Thorndike
- Portrayed by: Russell Thorndike; George Arliss; Peter Cushing; Patrick McGoohan

In-universe information
- Full name: Christopher Syn
- Aliases: Captain Clegg, "the Scarecrow"
- Gender: Male
- Occupation: Clergyman, pirate, harpooneer, smuggler
- Nationality: British

The Reverend Doctor Christopher Syn is the smuggler hero of a series of novels by Russell Thorndike. The character originated in an eponymous 1910 stage play, before making his literary debut in Doctor Syn: A Tale of the Romney Marsh, which was published in 1915. The story idea came from legendary coastal smuggling in the 18th century around the well-known Romney Marsh, where brandy and tobacco were brought in at night by boat from France to avoid the customs duties. Minor battles were fought, sometimes at night, between gangs of smugglers, such as the Hawkhurst Gang, and His Majesty's Customs and Excise, supported by the British Army, Royal Navy and local militias in the counties of the Kent and Sussex.

== Character biography ==
Christopher Syn, born 1729, is portrayed as a brilliant scholar from Queen's College, Oxford, possessing swashbuckling skills such as riding, fencing, and seamanship. He was content to live the quiet life of an Anglican vicar in Dymchurch-under-the-Wall under the patronage of Sir Charles Cobtree, the father of his best friend Anthony Cobtree, until his beautiful young Spanish wife Imogene was seduced by and eloped with Nicholas Tappitt, whom Dr Syn had considered a close friend.

Christopher Syn set out on a quest for revenge, always managing to reach the eloped pair's destinations ahead of them just in time to terrify them against landing and facing him in a deliberate campaign of terror. While sailing from Spain to the Americas in pursuit, his ship was captured by the pirate ship The Sulphur Pit, commanded by Captain Satan. In a one-on-one fight, Syn defeated and killed Captain Satan to take command of his ship and crew; among them was Mr. Mipps, a former British Royal Navy carpenter with whom Syn had become friends in England after rescuing him from the His Majesty's Customs and Excise men. Mipps swore loyalty to Syn from that time onward.

With Mipps at his side, Syn turned to piracy and became a great success. Later, when his crew refused to let Syn leave, Syn and Mipps slipped away in one of the ship's boats; unknown to Syn, Mipps had arranged a convenient "accident" in the ship's powder magazine with an exploding barrel of gunpowder, eliminating witnesses of Syn's piratical acts.

Mipps then joined Syn in his quest for revenge, pursuing Tappitt and Imogene throughout the thirteen American colonies of British America (supposedly preaching the gospel to the Indians) and around the world (as part of a whaling voyage) afterwards. Mipps was with him in the Caribbean when Dr. Syn turned again to piracy, assuming the name of Captain Clegg (taking the name "Clegg" from a certain vicious biting fly he had encountered in America). "Clegg" hijacked his enemy Tappitt's own ship and crew and sailed off with them (renaming the ship the Imogene) to become the most infamous pirate of the day.

However, a mulatto who escaped the destruction of Syn's previous ship stowed away in Clegg's ship and accused him before the crew; Clegg quelled the potential mutiny by having the mulatto's tongue cut out, marooning him on a coral reef and violently killing Yellow Pete, the ship's Chinese cook, who represented the crew in their wish to rescue the mulatto. Afterwards, realizing that Clegg had become too notorious, Syn decided to abandon his quest and return to England, and Mipps set up a second "accidental" explosion to destroy the Imogene and her crew.

Syn returned to England on the night of a storm (13 November 1775) that wrecked his brig off the English coast in sight of Dymchurch. That night he went to the house of his old friend (and now squire) Anthony Cobtree. When news came that the local vicar had drowned while trying to save victims of the shipwreck, Squire Cobtree offered the post to Christopher Syn. Syn accepted and settled down to a more respectable life as the vicar of Dymchurch and Dean of Peculiars in Romney Marsh, Kent, resuming his original name.

Mipps arrived in Dymchurch with the intent of settling down. Syn made him the village sexton upon condition that Mipps "remember to forget" (that Syn had been Clegg and that they had known each other before), and that Mipps never get involved with the local smugglers.

Syn soon became aware that his parishioners were smuggling goods from France to avoid the excessive customs duties the government charged. Learning from Mipps (who, contrary to Syn's orders, had become a leader of the smugglers) that certain townsfolk had been ambushed and captured during a smuggling run, Syn purchased the great black stallion Gehenna from gypsy horse-traders and raced to their rescue. A suit of clothing borrowed from a scarecrow made an improvised disguise, and Syn and Mipps were able to rescue the townsfolk from the Dragoons.

After this, Syn decided that he could only protect his people by becoming their leader. He created a more elaborate scarecrow costume, with eerie luminous paint. Riding Gehenna at night, the respectable Dr. Syn became "The Scarecrow", the feared head of the smugglers. Together with Mipps, he organized the smugglers into a well-organized band of "Night Riders", also called "The Devil Riders", with macabre disguises and code-names.

Syn's cunning was so great that the smugglers outwitted the government forces for many years. A hidden stable watched over by Mother Handaway, the local "witch" (who believed the Scarecrow to be The Devil in living form), was the hiding place for the horses of the Scarecrow and his lieutenants, Mipps and the local highwayman Jimmie Bone (who, being as good a horseman as Syn and of similar build, was sometimes called upon to impersonate the Scarecrow when Syn either had to be elsewhere or seen in the same place).

Shortly after the first appearances of the Scarecrow, Nicholas Tappitt (using the name "Colonel Delacourt") and the ailing Imogene returned to England, ending up in Dymchurch. Recognizing Syn as Clegg, Tappitt realized that Syn and the Scarecrow were one and the same person, and helped the authorities set a trap for him, hoping to both rid himself of his enemy and claim the reward for his capture. The trap was sprung, but Squire Cobtree's daughter Charlotte, who had fallen in love with Syn and also learned his secret identities as both Clegg and the Scarecrow, was the tragic victim when she dressed in the Scarecrow's disguise and was fatally wounded as a result. Tappitt was then suspected of being the Scarecrow, and a Customs officer and three constables came to arrest him. In the ensuing fight, Tappitt killed the Customs man and the constables subdued and arrested Tappitt for murdering the Customs officer.

After Imogene's death in Syn's arms (during which she revealed to him that he had a son by her who was missing somewhere in North America), Syn fought a final duel with Tappitt in his jail cell, defeating him. Syn then struck a bargain with Tappitt: if Tappitt confessed to being the notorious pirate Clegg, then Syn would look after and care for Tappitt and Imogene's new-born infant daughter (also named Imogene). Tappitt agreed, and "Captain Clegg" was hanged and later "buried without benefit of clergy at a cross-roads hard by the Kent Ditch".

Many years later, Captain Collyer, a Royal Navy officer assigned to smash the local smuggling ring, uncovered the deception and Dr. Syn's true identity, thanks in part to the tongueless mulatto (who had been rescued by Collyer years before and who had been serving Collyer as a "ferret" seeking out hidden contraband) who recognized Syn as Clegg. Syn evaded capture while at the same time making sure that Imogene and Squire Cobtree's son Denis (who had fallen in love with Imogene) would have a happy life together (they were eventually married), but was murdered in revenge by the mulatto, who then mysteriously managed to escape, leaving Syn harpooned through the neck. As a last mark of respect, Collyer ordered that Syn be buried at sea, rather than have his body hung in chains.

Mipps escaped in the confusion of Syn's death and disappeared from England, but it is said that a little man very much like him is living out his days in a Buddhist Monastery somewhere in the Malay Peninsula, delighting the monks with recounting the adventures of Doctor Syn and the eerie stories of the Romney Marsh and the mysterious Scarecrow and his Night Riders.

== Publication history ==
The Dr. Syn books detail his adventures and attempts to help the people of Dymchurch and the surrounding area evade the Excise tax. There are seven novels in the series:

- Doctor Syn: A Tale of the Romney Marsh (1915)
- Doctor Syn on the High Seas (1935)
- Doctor Syn Returns (1935)
- Further Adventures of Doctor Syn (1936)
- Amazing Quest of Doctor Syn (1938)
- Courageous Exploits of Doctor Syn (1939)
- Shadow of Doctor Syn (1944)

Note: the "first" book, Doctor Syn, is actually the final story chronologically; the others proceed in published sequence.

An expanded version of Doctor Syn Returns titled The Scarecrow Rides was published for the U.S. market by The Dial Press in 1935; years later in 2013 it was re-printed in paperback by Black Curtain Press. (ISBN 978-1627554459).

In 1960, American author William Buchanan reworked Thorndike's Further Adventures of Doctor Syn under the title Christopher Syn (New York, Abelard Schuman), giving Thorndike co-authorship credit; this version provides a different conclusion and some conflation, renaming and even removal of the supporting characters. Christopher Syn became the basis for the 1962 Disney production; there was also a novelization of the Disney theatrical version titled Doctor Syn, Alias the Scarecrow written by Vic Crume.

== In other media ==
=== Films ===
Three film adaptations have been made of Dr. Syn's exploits.

==== Doctor Syn (1937) ====
The first, Doctor Syn (1937), starred George Arliss in the title role and was his last film.

==== Captain Clegg (1962) ====
Captain Clegg (1962), (known as Night Creatures when released in the United States), was produced by Hammer Film Productions with actor Peter Cushing in the lead role, directed by Peter Graham Scott. In the screenplay by Anthony Hinds, the main character's name was changed from "Doctor Syn" to "Parson Blyss" to avoid copyrights problems with Disney's forthcoming version, and Captain Clegg's screenplay follows the novel Doctor Syn and the screenplay of the 1937 film closely with the exception of a tightening of the plot. In the Arliss film Doctor Syn, Syn escapes to sea with Mipps and the rest of the Dymchurch smugglers, whereas Captain Clegg ends more faithfully to the novel, with Parson Blyss being killed by the mulatto (who is then killed by Mipps) and then being carried to and buried in Captain Clegg's empty grave by Mipps. Captain Clegg was released in the United Kingdom on DVD and Blu-ray in 2014; Night Creatures was never released on videotape in the United States, but is included in the 2014 two-disc DVD collection The Hammer Horror Series. In North America, the film was released on 6 September 2005 along with seven other Hammer horror films on the 4-DVD set The Hammer Horror Series, part of MCA-Universal's "Franchise Collection". This set was re-released on Blu-ray 13 September 2016. A Blu-ray was released in the UK on 23 June 2014 by Final Cut Entertainment. In 2021, Powerhouse Films re-released the film on Blu-Ray, along with The Shadow of the Cat, The Phantom of the Opera, and Nightmare, as part of Hammer Volume Six: Night Shadows boxset.

==== The Scarecrow of Romney Marsh (1963) ====
The Scarecrow of Romney Marsh (1963) was produced for the Walt Disney's Wonderful World of Color weekly TV series on Sunday evenings on the National Broadcasting Company (NBC-TV network). It was shot on location in Kent and was directed by James Neilson. It stars Patrick McGoohan in the title role of the supposedly meek, mild, intellectual village parson, with George Cole as Mipps and Australian actor Sean Scully as young John Banks, the younger son of local nobleman Squire Thomas Banks (Michael Hordern), who acted as the Scarecrow's second lieutenant. This version, based on the Thorndike/Buchanan novel Christopher Syn, generally followed the storyline of The Further Adventures of Dr. Syn (changing the gender of the Scarecrow's lieutenant Curlew from the novel's Squire Banks' daughter Jenny to the film's son John), but made no mention of Dr. Syn's past as the pirate Captain Clegg, and made it clear that the good Dr. Syn did not die or stage his own death: at the film's end, he is seen having a cup of tea with the local Squire, who admits to owing a debt of gratitude to the Scarecrow.

The local Church of England parish of St Clement's Church in Old Romney, Kent doubled as Dr Syn's fictional Dymchurch parish church in the production, and the Disney studio funded the repair of the building to use it as a filming location.

Part One dealt with the arrival of General Pugh (Geoffrey Keen), who had been ordered by the War Office in London to smash the smuggling ring along that part of the coast of Kent and Sussex, and his using a Dymchurch man captured by a Royal Navy press gang as bait to trap the infamous Scarecrow. Part Two of the series depicted the Scarecrow dealing with the traitorous Joe Ransley (Patrick Wymark). Part Three showed how the Scarecrow rescued Squire Banks' eldest son Harry (David Buck), who had been press-ganged into the Royal Navy but escaped and returned to Dymchurch, and American colonist Simon Bates (Tony Britton), who was wanted on a charge of treason for speaking against unfair American taxation, from General Pugh's clutches in Dover Castle. A romantic subplot throughout all three episodes was the courtship of Squire Banks' daughter Kate (Jill Curzon) by General Pugh's aide Lt. Philip Brackenbury (Eric Flynn).

While originally conceived and edited for American television (and announced in an advertisement by the NBC network in the Tuesday, 9 July 1963, issue of the noted entertainment industry newspaper The Hollywood Reporter, published in Los Angeles, California), The Scarecrow of Romney Marsh was re-edited for a 1963 British theatrical release several months before the American prime-time television debut. Retitled as Dr Syn, Alias the Scarecrow, the British theatrical version was released on a double bill with the animated The Sword in the Stone during the December 1963 Christmas season (advertised in the January 1964 issue of Photoplay magazin). This version was shown in continental Europe and later on Latin American television in 1966.

In the 1970s, the Scarecrow of Romney Marsh production was re-edited again for its first American theatrical release by the Disney studios, on double bills with both the animated Snow White and the Seven Dwarfs (1937) and Treasure Island (1950). Shortly after the theatrical run in the United States, it was re-edited once more for a two-part presentation and rebroadcast on Disney's television series a decade later in the 1970s, simply omitting the middle episode. It was broadcast again in the late 1980s Wonderful World of Disney syndication package, and again in the 1990s on the Disney Channel.

The VHS release of the 1980s was expanded to include material from all three episodes of the original NBC broadcast while retaining the feature film structure and credits; it was available for a relatively short amount of time. On 11 November 2008 The Walt Disney Company released a limited pressing of 39,500 copies of The Scarecrow of Romney Marsh in DVD format for the first time in a collector's metal case. This was a part of the Disney Treasures collection and was retitled Dr. Syn: The Scarecrow of Romney Marsh. This release sold out in only three weeks. The DVD was made available again for the members of the Disney Movie Club on 17 February 2009. This two-disc set includes the American television version and the original British theatrical release version Dr Syn, Alias the Scarecrow in a widescreen format. It also includes the original televised introductions by Walt Disney, as was traditional for the Sunday night programme in 1963–1964 (in which he erroneously states that Dr. Syn was an actual historical figure) and also contains a documentary feature on Disney's interest in filming the story.

In October 2019, the Disney Movie Club released it in Blu-ray format, this time entitling it The Scarecrow of Romney Marsh. The single disc contains all three episodes as originally broadcast in 1964. It also includes Walt Disney's filmed introductions, but none of the supplementary features that appeared with the 2009 release.

=== Theatre ===
The character originated on stage in the 1910 play Doctor Syn, authored by and starring Thorndike himself as both Syn and Mipps. Following its brief run, Thorndike salvaged the plot as the first novel. A more successful version by Thorndike and Ivan Firth premiered at Wyndham's Theatre in 1925, running across several venues through to late 1928.

In the late 1940s, Thorndike again played Syn in two plays he co-wrote: Dr. Syn’s Christmas, 1793 (1945-1946) and The Return of Dr. Syn (1947).

In 2001 a stage adaptation titled Doctor Syn was performed at churches throughout the Romney Marsh, the final night being performed in Dymchurch. The cast featured Daniel Thorndike (the author's son), Michael Fields, Steven Povey and Ben Barton, along with various amateurs from the area.

British composer Adam Pounds has written an opera, Syn, based on the character of Doctor Syn, excerpts of which were performed at the Mumford Theatre in Cambridge, in 2021.

=== Audio adaptations ===
==== Doctor Syn ====
Rufus Sewell read a 10-part audio adaptation combining and abridging Doctor Syn on the High Seas and Doctor Syn Returns for BBC Radio, broadcast on BBC Radio 7 in December 2006 and repeated in June 2007.

==== The Further Adventures of Doctor Syn ====
A 10-part audio adaptation of The Further Adventures of Doctor Syn (combining and abridging The Further Adventures of Doctor Syn and The Shadow of Doctor Syn) read by Rufus Sewell was performed on BBC Radio 7 in December 2007.

==== The Last of Doctor Syn ====
BBC Radio 7 broadcast the six-part series, an abridged reading by Rufus Sewell of the original Doctor Syn novel, from 4–11 January 2010.

==== No Quarter ====
John Paul Jones of Led Zeppelin reinterpreted elements of the Doctor Syn story as his "No Quarter" fantasy sequence in Led Zeppelin's concert film The Song Remains the Same.

=== Comic books ===
A three-issue adaptation of the Disney production was published by Gold Key Comics under the Scarecrow of Romney Marsh title, spanning April 1964 through October 1965.

A much abridged revision of the adventures of Dr. Syn appeared as a short comic serialized in the monthly publication Disney Adventures. The new story features the heroic Doctor and his young sidekick protecting innocent villagers from corrupt government officials and soldiers. Disney Adventures would also produce a crossover story with the Pirates of the Caribbean film franchise, where coincidentally the meek, mild intellectual country priest / vicar "Dr. Syn" (secretly infamous English smuggler gang leader and rebel in the Scarecrow of Romney Marsh), meets up with Captain Jack Sparrow.

Doctor Syn appears in the League of Extraordinary Gentlemen series as a member of the league gathered by Lemuel Gulliver. His alter ego, Captain Clegg, also makes appearances, where he is mentioned to have had a brief romantic liaison with future teammate Fanny Hill. In the 2003 film adaptation of League, Dr. Syn can be spotted in one of the portraits hanging on the wall in M's library.

== Cultural legacy ==
A "Days of Syn" festival is held even-numbered years by Dymchurch residents for fund-raising. The 2006 "Days of Syn" was on 26–28 August (UK August Bank Holiday weekend) and featured a talk on Dr. Syn at the Anglican church at 6:30 pm. On Sunday at 3 p.m. there was a church service where Dr. Syn and the cast appeared in period costume. On Monday, starting at the Bowery Hall, scenes were reenacted from Doctor Syn, and again during the day along the Dymchurch shoreline and in the Ocean pub.

In 2009, discussions took place to build a 100 ft high statue of "The Scarecrow" on a site in the centre of Romney Marsh. This had not been done by 2016.

Doctor Syn is also the name given to one of the locomotives on the Romney, Hythe and Dymchurch Railway.

Doctor Syn also inspired novelist George Chittenden, who captured smuggling on the Kent coast in his debut novel The Boy Who Led Them, which follows the rise and fall of a smuggling gang leader further down the coast in the town of Deal.

In 2009, an playfully erotic Afrikaans novel, Dagtaak, was published pseudonymously by “D R Syn”. The author's name and some of the traits of the main character in this novel allude to the Dr Syn series. Initial advances to produce an arthouse circuit movie from the novel did not come to fruition.

Two rooms in the Mermaid Inn, Rye (Dr. Syn's Bed Chamber and Dr. Syn's Lounge) are named after the character.
