= Double Trouble (1967 film) =

1967 American film by Norman Taurog

- Theatrical release poster
- Directed by: Norman Taurog
- Screenplay by: Jo Heims
- Story by: Mark Brandel
- Produced by: Irwin Winkler; Judd Bernard
- Starring: Elvis Presley; John Williams; Yvonne Romain; The Wiere Brothers; Annette Day
- Cinematography: Daniel L. Fapp
- Edited by: John McSweeney Jr.
- Music by: Jeff Alexander
- Production company: Metro-Goldwyn-Mayer
- Distributed by: Metro-Goldwyn-Mayer
- Release date: May 24, 1967 (USA)
- Running time: 92 minutes
- Country: United States
- Language: English
- Box office: $1,600,000 (US/ Canada)

Double Trouble is a 1967 American musical film starring Elvis Presley. The comedic plot concerns an American singer who crosses paths with criminals in Europe. The movie was #58 on the year-end list of the top-grossing films of 1967. It was Presley's twenty-fourth movie, but was actually filmed before his twenty-third film, Easy Come, Easy Go, which was released earlier in the year on March 22, 1967.

== Plot ==
When singer Guy Lambert and his entourage travel from Swinging London to Antwerp on a tour, he is followed by Jill Conway, a beautiful but unworldly heiress, and Claire Dunham, a sexy, sophisticated socialite. Complicating matters are a pair of ineptly comical jewel thieves who have hidden smuggled diamonds in Jill's luggage, a trio of bumbling Clouseau-like Flemish detectives, and a mysterious murderer who seems bent on killing Jill.

== Cast ==
- Elvis Presley: Guy Lambert
- Annette Day: Jill Conway
- John Williams: Gerald Waverly
- Yvonne Romain: Claire Dunham
- Chips Rafferty: Archie Brown
- Norman Rossington: Arthur Babcock
- Michael Murphy: Morley
- Leon Askin: Inspector de Groote
- Monte Landis: Georgie
- Wiere Bros: Themselves

== Background ==
It was the first film produced by Irwin Winkler, a manager who had impressed Robert O'Brien, head of MGM, during the making of Doctor Zhivago (1965). O'Brien suggested Winkler produce a movie for MGM, and Russell Thatcher, head of the studio's story department, offered the script for Double Trouble, thinking it would make an ideal vehicle for Julie Christie, who had been in Doctor Zhivago. Winkler agreed and took the project to O'Brien, who said he wanted to make it, but starring Elvis Presley instead of Christie. The script had to be rewritten to accommodate Presley. Although the film was set in Europe, all the action was shot on the MGM backlot in Culver City.

Winkler later wrote that his first "foray into Hollywood" was "with a famous male rock singer playing a dramatic role that had been written for a woman, a controlling, hostile manager, a story that took place in Europe and would be shot in Culver City, California, and a very nice director who could hardly walk up the stairs to meet me and who'd told me he was going blind." Judd Bernard, the other producer, does not mention that the role of Elvis in "Double trouble" would have been written for a woman.

Elvis was paid $750,000 plus 40% of the profits.

Renowned character actor Michael Murphy made his big-screen, feature-film debut playing the character Morley.

== Reception ==
Howard Thompson of The New York Times called the film "pretty fair and far better than the last three Presley clinkers," adding, "The studio-photographed action, most of it very silly, has been blended rather neatly with the authentic backgrounds. At least the picture moves. Furthermore, the good tunes arrive thick and fast, and several numbers are festive and charming." Variety wrote that the film "appears to have been whipped up to showcase a big name without much thought of content other than to serve as footage to cash in on the star's draw," though the review thought that Presley "gives a pretty fair account of himself despite what's handed him and the substantial hold he wields over his public should help reception." Kevin Thomas of the Los Angeles Times praised the "likable" cast and production values that were better than those of most Presley films: "The cast never left Culver City, but you would never know it, so cleverly have quaint Belgian streets and other European settings been reproduced on the back lot." The Monthly Film Bulletin wrote, "As an attempt to provide Presley with slightly different material (while retaining, of course, the usual plethora of songs), this comedy-thriller misfires, despite its genial approach."
