= Dymchurch Martello Tower =

Martello Tower in Dymchurch, Kent, England

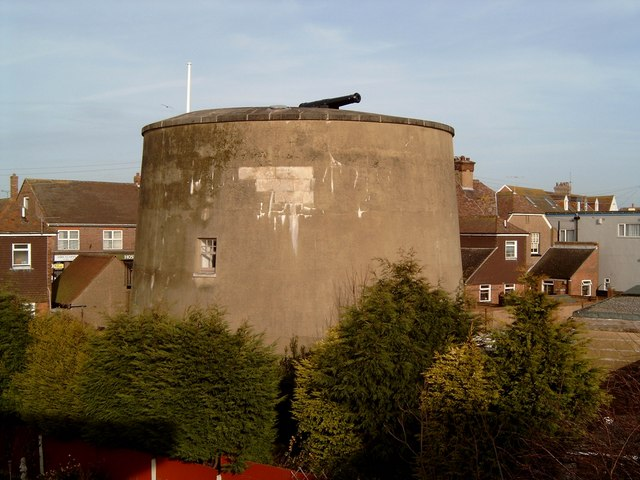
- Tower 24

- Dymchurch Martello Tower location in Kent
- 51°01′29″N 0°59′47″E
- Location: High Street, Dymchurch
- OS grid reference: TR10164 29252

History
- Built: 1805

Site notes
- Area: Kent
- Owner: English Heritage

Scheduled monument
- Official name: Martello tower no 24 at Dymchurch
- Designated: 9 October 1981
- Reference no.: 1014626

Listed Building – Grade II
- Official name: Martello Tower No 24
- Designated: 23 April 1985
- Reference no.: 1061124

Dymchurch Martello Tower is a Martello tower in Dymchurch, Kent England. It stands immediately behind the sea wall.

It has been designated by English Heritage as a scheduled monument and a Grade II listed building.

The towers, ranging along the Kent and East Sussex shoreline, were built in the early years of the nineteenth century as part of a coastal defence programme against a threatened French invasion under Napoleon. The 24th of 75 such towers, it was placed to protect the gates of marsh sluices with its counterpart Tower no 25 (which is now largely derelict).

Tower 23 was restored externally in the early 1970s and is currently a private residence. Tower 24 was then restored using Tower 23 as a guide. In 1969, it became the first Martello tower to be opened to the public and remains as a museum of the Martello Towers, owned by English Heritage. It has a 24-pounder muzzle-loading cannon on the gun platform.

The Friends of Martello24 act as custodians of the tower on behalf of English Heritage and manage its openings to the public, both on a regular basis and bespoke visits. The tower is open every Saturday, Sunday and bank holiday from 2 pm to 4 pm, Easter to October.
