= Amazing Quest of Doctor Syn =

First edition (publ. Rich & Cowan)

Amazing Quest of Doctor Syn is the fifth in the series of Doctor Syn novels by Russell Thorndike. Published in 1938, it follows the events of Further Adventures of Doctor Syn and is followed by Courageous Exploits of Doctor Syn. It was dedicated to actor George Arliss, who had starred in a feature film adaptation of the first novel a year prior.

== Plot ==
In 1780, Doctor Syn travels to Wales to compete with another smuggler.

== Critical reception ==
Critics noted that its plot covered a wider range of territory, including North Wales. Audiences were more familiar with the character than ever, thanks to the recent film, and the novel fulfilled the heightened expectations.

== Publication ==
Originally published by Rich and Cowan in 1938, it has been reprinted many times in both hardcover and paperback editions, including by Arrow Books (1959), Panther (1964) Jarrolds (1966) and other more recent small presses.
