= Captain Clegg (film) =

1962 British film by Peter Graham Scott

- Theatrical release poster
- Directed by: Peter Graham Scott
- Written by: Anthony Hinds
- Produced by: John Temple-Smith
- Starring: Peter Cushing; Yvonne Romain; Patrick Allen; Oliver Reed
- Cinematography: Arthur Grant
- Edited by: Eric Boyd-Perkins
- Music by: Don Banks
- Production company: Hammer Film Productions
- Distributed by: Rank Organization (UK); Universal-International (US)
- Release dates: 13 June 1962 (United States); 25 June 1962 (United Kingdom)
- Running time: 82 minutes
- Country: United Kingdom
- Language: English

Captain Clegg (US title: Night Creatures) is a 1962 British adventure film directed by Peter Graham Scott and starring Peter Cushing, Yvonne Romain, Patrick Allen, and Oliver Reed. It was produced by John Temple-Smith for Hammer Film Productions. It is loosely based on the Doctor Syn character created by Russell Thorndike. The British prints were in Technicolor, while the US prints were in Eastman Color.

== Plot ==
In 1776, a mulatto sailor is marooned on an island after assaulting the wife of pirate captain Nathaniel Clegg. By 1792, Clegg has supposedly been captured by the Royal Navy and hanged. His resting place is the coastal village of Dymchurch on the Romney Marsh. The surrounding countryside is home to the "Marsh Phantoms": figures on horseback who ride by night and bring terror to the village.

Captain Collier and his band of sailors arrive in Dymchurch to investigate reports that the locals are involved in the smuggling of alcohol, from France. They are accompanied by the mulatto, mute after his tongue was cut out sixteen years earlier, whom Collier saved from death and now keeps as a slave. As Collier's men ransack an ale house run by Rash and his ward Imogène, the mulatto uncovers a hidden cellar. Ostensibly a varnish store, this is connected by a secret passageway to the home of coffin-maker Jeremiah Mipps, which serves as the smugglers' headquarters. The smugglers are led by the village parson Dr Blyss, whom the mulatto inexplicably attacks before being subdued by the sailors.

That night, the smugglers succeed in transporting a consignment to a nearby windmill for onward shipment, although squire's son Harry, Imogène's secret fiancé, is wounded when he is shot in the arm by the pursuing Collier. Back at the ale house, Rash kills one of the sailors to prevent the smuggling operation from being exposed. This frees the mulatto, who leaves for the churchyard to break open Clegg's grave. Collier, who spent years chasing Clegg, becomes suspicious of Blyss when the mulatto later makes a second attempt on the parson's life.

At Blyss's house, Rash finds Clegg's last will and testament. Learning that Imogène is Clegg's daughter, he attempts to take advantage of her compromised situation to rape her, but she escapes and flees to Blyss's home. There, Blyss and Harry both tell her they were already aware of her relationship to Clegg. After consoling Imogène, Harry confronts Rash but is arrested by Collier when the captain notices the young man's bandaged arm. Harry is led away to Collier's ship as a hostage but escapes when the Marsh Phantoms appear, distracting the sailors. The Phantoms, who are actually villagers in disguise, take Harry and Imogène to the church, where they are hurriedly married by Blyss before leaving to start their life together.

Collier arrives at the church and announces that Clegg's grave is empty. He then tears off Blyss's collar to reveal the rope burns from an unsuccessful hanging, exposing the parson as Clegg. Clegg declares that his executioner spared his life and that he wished only to help the inhabitants of Dymchurch live comfortably. A struggle breaks out between the villagers and the sailors, enabling Clegg to flee with Mipps via the secret passageway. However, on emerging at the coffin-maker's house they run into the mulatto, who has murdered Rash and fatally impales Clegg with a spear before being shot dead by Mipps. In the film's closing scene, the villagers look on and Collier and the sailors salute as Mipps sorrowfully places Clegg's body in the open grave.

== Cast ==
- Peter Cushing as Parson Blyss/Captain Clegg
- Yvonne Romain as Imogene
- Patrick Allen as Captain Collier
- Oliver Reed as Harry
- Michael Ripper as Mipps
- David Lodge as bosun
- Derek Francis as Squire
- Jack MacGowran as frightened man
- Peter Halliday as 1st sailor
- Martin Benson as Rash
- Daphne Anderson as Mrs. Rash
- Milton Reid as the mulatto
- Terry Scully as 2nd sailor
- Rupert Osborn as Gerry
- Sydney Bromley as Tom Ketch
- Gordon Rollings as Wurzel
- Bob Head as Peg-leg
- Colin Douglas as pirate bosun
- Kate O'Mara as girl at Inn (uncredited)

== Production ==
Filming took place at Bray Studios in Berkshire.

== Release ==
The film was released as part of a B movie double-feature with Phantom of the Opera (1962).

== Home media ==
In North America, the film was released on 6 September 2005 along with seven other Hammer horror films on the 4-DVD set The Hammer Horror Series (ASIN: B0009X770O), which is part of MCA-Universal's "Franchise Collection". This set was re-released on Blu-ray 13 September 2016.

A Blu-ray was released in the UK on 23 June 2014 by Final Cut Entertainment. In 2021, Powerhouse Films re-released the film on Blu-Ray, along with The Shadow of the Cat, The Phantom of the Opera, and Nightmare, as part of Hammer Volume Six: Night Shadows boxset.

== Reception ==
Variety wrote that the film had a "good" screenplay and "savvy" direction, "and the range of technical credits are all on the plus side, especially Arthur Grant's photography."

The Monthly Film Bulletin wrote: "The script is feeble, the acting, apart from Patrick Allen's forceful hero, uninspired, and the obsession with injury, degradation and death more dispiriting than ever."

Leonard Maltin awarded the film two and a half out of four stars, calling it "good fun with some scary moments."

Donald Guarisco from Allmovie called it "one of the best Hammer Films productions", praising the film's imaginative script, and colourful characterisations.

DVD Talk called the film "a winner that affords opportunities for several Hammer stalwarts to play refreshingly well-defined characters."
