= Russell Thorndike =

British actor and novelist (1885–1972)

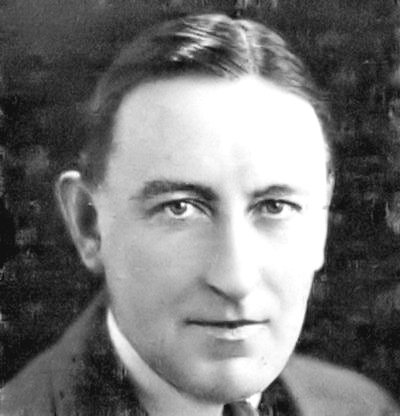
- Thorndike aged about 40
- Born: 6 February 1885; Rochester, Kent, England
- Died: 7 November 1972 (aged 87); London, England
- Occupations: Actor, novelist
- Notable work: Doctor Syn novels
- Spouse: Rosemary Dowson (m. 1918)
- Relatives: Sybil Thorndike (sister); Christopher Casson (nephew); Mary Casson (niece); Ann Casson (niece)
- Military career
- Conflicts: World War I: Gallipoli Campaign

Arthur Russell Thorndike (6 February 1885 – 7 November 1972) was a British actor and novelist, best known for the Doctor Syn of Romney Marsh novels. Less well-known than his sister Sybil but equally versatile, Russell Thorndike's first love was writing and, after serving in World War I, he devoted himself to it.

== Background ==
He was born in Rochester, Kent, where his father had recently become a canon at the cathedral. He was a student at the King's School, Rochester and at St George's School, Windsor Castle and a chorister of St George's Chapel; he later recounted this experience in his book Children of the Garter (1937). Thorndike married Rosemary Dowson, a daughter of the well-known actress Rosina Filippi, in 1918.

== Acting ==
At his suggestion, both he and Sybil (who once aspired to be a concert pianist) tried acting as a career in 1903. They became students at Ben Greet's Academy and two years later accompanied fellow members of the company on a North American tour, which included New York City. He remained three-and-a-half years with the company, once giving three performances as Hamlet in three different versions of the text on the same day. He also toured in South Africa and Asia.

In 1914 he enlisted. His brother Frank, who once performed on stage, was killed in action. Russell was severely wounded at Gallipoli and discharged. He rejoined Ben Greet's theatre company and his sister at the Old Vic in 1916, where he played in Shakespeare's King John, Richard II, and King Lear. Thorndike also acted with Sybil and her husband, Lewis Casson, in their touring repertory performing melodramas. In 1922 he was applauded for his performance in the first professional production of Henrik Ibsen's Peer Gynt at the Old Vic.

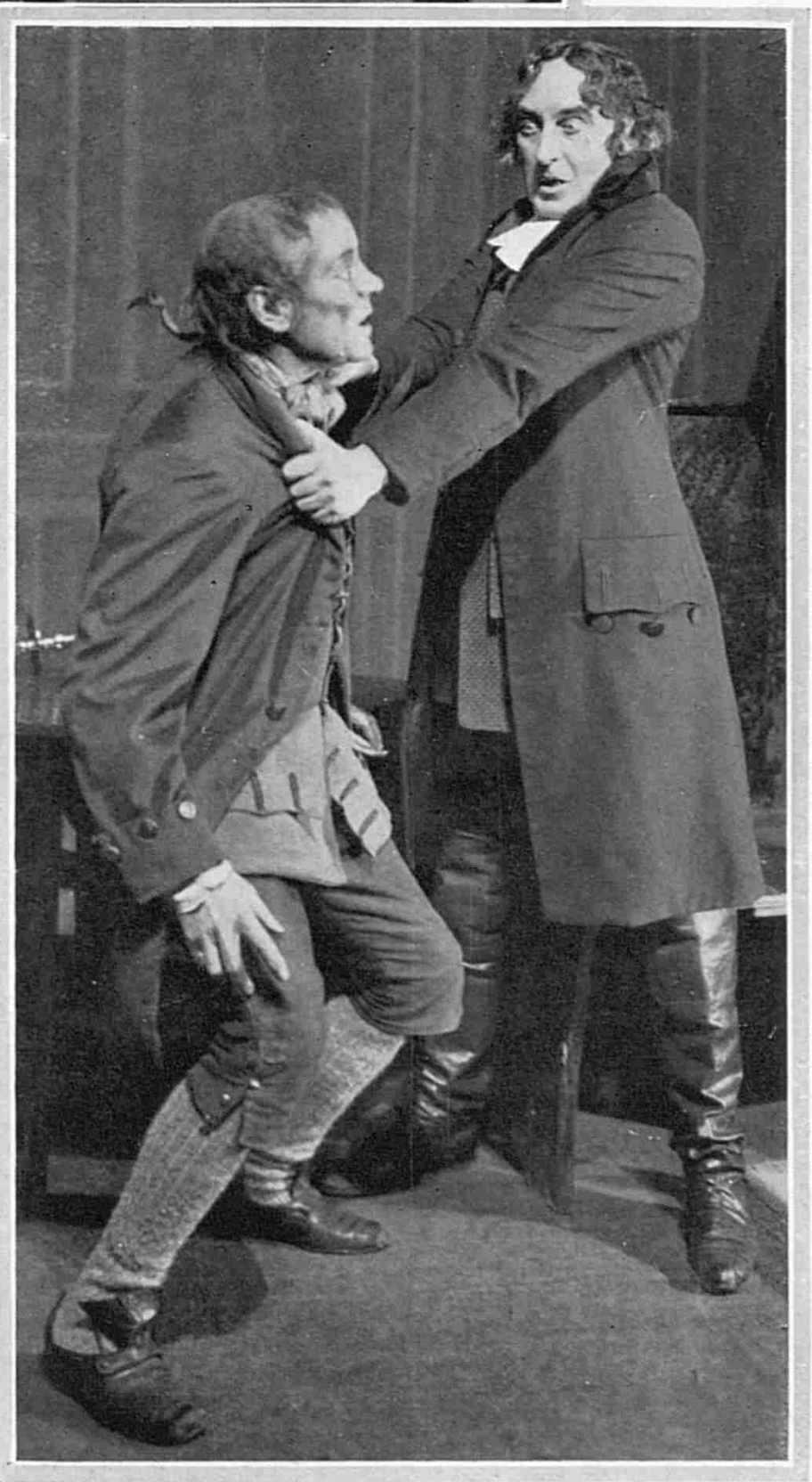
Tom Reynolds as Mipps (left) and Russell Thorndike as Doctor Syn (right) in the 1927 production at The Strand Theatre.

In film, Thorndike's appearances were infrequent. He played Macbeth (1922) in a silent version of the play opposite Sybil's Lady and also played leads in silent versions of other classic plays, including Scrooge (1923) as Old Ebenezer, and The School for Scandal (1923) as Sir Peter Teazle. He ended his film career in minor priest roles for Laurence Olivier in Hamlet (1948) and Richard III (1955). Although Thorndike appeared on the stage over four decades (including playing his own Dr. Syn character and entertaining audiences as Smee in ten revivals of Peter Pan, including the famous Scala Theatre version where Donald Sinden doubled the roles of Mr Darling and Captain Hook), he felt a deeper fulfilment in writing, which would include the later work The House of Jeffreys.

== Writing ==
Published in the Dymchurch Day of Syn programme from 1985 is an apocryphal biography of Thorndike that indicates it was during the period of touring with Ben Greet's theatre company, that Russell and his sister Sybil came up with the idea of Doctor Syn. The story goes, both were with the company in Spartanburg when a man was murdered on the street outside their hotel. The article suggests the corpse lay there for some time while "... his glazed eyes seemed to stare right up into Sybil's bedroom". Sybil was unable to sleep, so she asked Russell to sit up with her. She made a pot of tea while they talked, and the character of Doctor Syn was born. As the night went on, "They piled horror on horror's head and after each new horror was invented they took another squint at the corpse to encourage them." Around this time he completed his first novel of romantic adventure on Romney Marsh entitled Doctor Syn: A Tale of the Romney Marsh.

== Personal life ==
Thorndike and his wife had five children: Daniel (1920-2016), an actor; Dickon (1921-2016); Jill (1924-2013); Georgia (born 1927), who married the theatre administrator David Peacock; and Rhona (1929-2016).

He died in 1972, aged 87, and is buried in the churchyard of St Peter and St Paul, Dymchurch, made famous by his Dr Syn novels.

== Filmography ==
Year	Title	Role	Notes
1922	Macbeth	Macbeth	Short
1922	It's Never Too Late to Mend	Squire Meadows	Short, directed by George Wynn
1922	Tense Moments from Great Plays	Macbeth / Squire Meadows	(segments "Macbeth", and "It's Never Too Late to Mend")
1923	The Bells	Mathias	Short
1923	The Audacious Mr. Squire	Harry Smallwood	
1923	Heartstrings	Tom Openshaw	
1923	The Fair Maid of Perth	Dwining	
1924	Miriam Rozella	Crewe Stevens	
1924	Human Desires	Paul Perot	
1933	A Shot in the Dark	Dr. Stuart	
1933	The Roof	Clive Bristow	
1933	Puppets of Fate	Dr. Orton Munroe	
1934	Whispering Tongues	Fenwick	
1936	Fame	Judge	
1944	Fiddlers Three	High Priest	
1944	Henry V	Duke of Bourbon	
1945	Caesar and Cleopatra	Harpist's Master	Uncredited
1948	Hamlet	Priest	
1955	Richard III	First Priest	

== Selected writings ==
- Doctor Syn: A Tale of the Romney Marsh (1915)
- The Tragedy of Mr. Punch: A Fantastic Play in Prologue and One Act (with Reginald Arkell) (1924)
- The Slype (1927)
- Herod's Peal (1931)
- The Water Witch (1932)
- Jet And Ivory (1934)
- Doctor Syn Returns (1935)
- Doctor Syn on the High Seas (1936)
- Further Adventures of Doctor Syn (1936)
- Amazing Quest of Doctor Syn (1938)
- Courageous Exploits of Doctor Syn (1939)
- Show House Sold (1941)
- Shadow of Doctor Syn (1944)
- The Master of the Macabre (1947)
- In the Steps of Shakespeare (1950)
- Children Of The Garter
- The House Of Jeffreys
- The Vandekkers
- Sybil Thorndike
- Saul: A Historical Tragedy in Five Acts, Depicting the Life and Death of King Saul
