= Dymchurch =

Village in Kent, England

Coordinates: 51.027°N 1.00°E

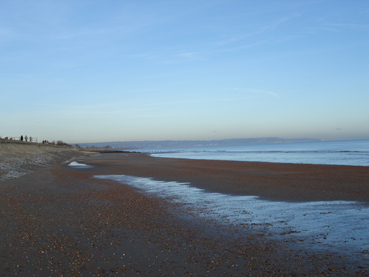
- Dymchurch Beach

- Location within Kent
- Population: 3,752 (2011)
- District: Folkestone and Hythe
- Shire county: Kent
- Region: South East
- Country: England
- Sovereign state: United Kingdom
- Post town: ROMNEY MARSH
- Postcode district: TN29
- Dialling code: 01303
- Police: Kent
- Fire: Kent
- Ambulance: South East Coast
- UK Parliament: Folkestone and Hythe

Dymchurch is a village and civil parish in the Folkestone and Hythe district of Kent, England. The village is located on the coast five miles (8 km) south-west of Hythe, and on the Romney Marsh.

== History ==
The history of Dymchurch began with the gradual build-up of the Romney Marsh.

New Hall was rebuilt in 1575 after an earlier wooden structure was destroyed in a fire. It was used as a court room for the Romney Marsh area. The head magistrate was known as Leveller of the Marsh Scotts. It was there that the so-called Scot tax was introduced, levied on residents to fund maintenance of the sea wall. Those directly outside the boundaries and thus not eligible for the tax were said to have got away "scot free". Residents with land were required to grow thorn bushes for building of the wall, as thorn twigs were believed impervious to sea water. Failure resulted in an ear being cut off.

During the 17th and 18th centuries, smuggling was rife all along the south-east coast of England. Due to its remote location, Romney Marsh and the surrounding areas were amongst the busiest locations for illicit trade. This inspired Russell Thorndike to set his Doctor Syn smuggling novels in Dymchurch. Every two years a celebration of the novels is held, usually on August Bank Holiday.

Dymchurch played a significant role in the Anglo-French Survey (1784–1790), which linked the Royal Greenwich Observatory with the Paris Observatory using trigonometry. There were two baselines for the English part of the survey, on Hounslow Heath and on Romney Marsh. The Romney Marsh base-line extended from Ruckinge to High Nook, on the sea-wall near Dymchurch.

=== Dymchurch Martello towers ===
Several Martello towers were built in the nineteenth century as part of an Empire-wide coastal defence programme: most have since fallen into the sea or become dilapidated. Tower 23 was restored externally in the early 1970s and is currently a private residence. Tower 24 has undergone renovation and using Tower 23 used as a guide: in 1969 it became the first Martello tower to be opened to the public and remains as a museum of Martello Towers, owned by English Heritage. Tower 25 is possibly the only empty tower that is regularly maintained.

=== Dymchurch Redoubt ===
Two redoubt forts were constructed into the south coast Martello chain to act as supply depots for the local Martellos, and were originally described as "eleven-gun towers". A four-gun tower was originally proposed at Dymchurch, but this idea was revised at the Rochester conference of 1804. Dymchurch Redoubt was built between 1806 and 1809 to the same specifications as its Eastbourne counterpart, although Dymchurch does not have any caponiers. A caponier is a type of fortification structure. The word originates from the French word caponnière. It is a type of fortification structure which allows firing along the bottom of a dry moat that surrounds the main fortress.

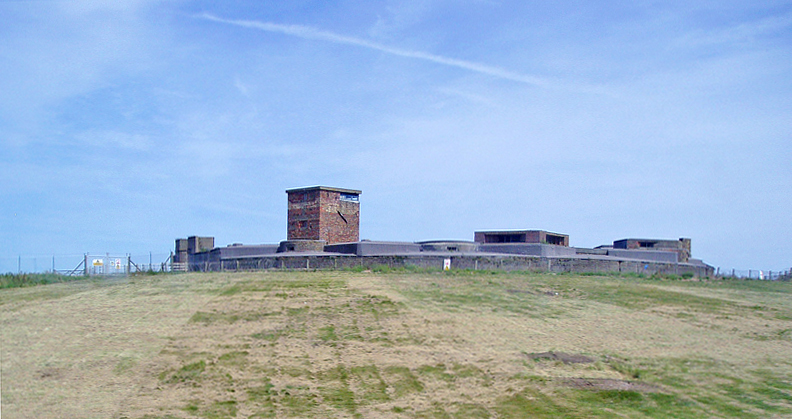
The Dymchurch Redoubt

In 1908, Walter Jerrold described the village as "a quiet scattered village and a delightful place far from the madding crowd". It is typical of this part of the coast, having originally been a very small village which became a much larger settlement during the 1930s. Many of homes from this era were converted railway carriages: very few of these remain, although a few similar ones still exist in nearby Dungeness. Dymchurch is now a popular seaside resort complete with holiday camp, caravan parks, light railway station and amusement park. Today the village is relatively large and mainly dedicated to seasonal tourism.

== Second World War ==
- On 24 August 1940, Dymchurch was bombed and the first local people were killed by enemy action, Alfred and Ada Austin. Their house, Sea Breeze, was rebuilt.
- The Observer Corps used Martello Tower 25 as a vantage post and it was from there, later in the war that the first V-1 flying bomb to fly over England was spotted.
- In 1942, the primary school suffered a direct hit from a bomb dropped from a plane. The teacher and pupils had escaped to the bomb shelter, and there were no reported casualties. In February 1944 a USAF Flying Fortress developed engine trouble while returning from a bombing raid and crashed into the police station, damaging several neighbouring houses in Lyndhurst Road. A soldier was killed and three people injured.
- In May 1944, 22 soldiers were killed by the explosion of anti-tank grenades at Dymchurch. The cause of the explosion was uncertain; at the inquest it was suggested that it may have been the heat of the sun, or a match-head falling into a box of detonators.
- Dymchurch underwent significant re-fortification during the Second World War, with bunkers and pillboxes. The gun platforms were encased in concrete for machine guns to be mounted, artillery emplacements constructed and an observation post erected. On the western extreme of the Hythe Ranges, during the 1970s the Redoubt was being used by the British Army for training soldiers for urban combat. The ranges remain in the possession of the Ministry of Defence.

== Governance ==
Dymchurch is part of the electoral ward of Dymchurch and St Mary's Bay. The population of this ward at the 2011 Census was 6,291. In 2018, Thomas Quaye was elected to the Parish Council.

== Famous residents and cultural connections ==
In January 1867, the Courier de Dieppe was spotted foundering in a gale off Dymchurch, with the crew clinging to the rigging and one by one dropping off into the sea. After repeated attempts, a line was thrown to the boat, but by this time there was only one of its crew left. The Reverend Charles Cobb, rector of the parish, volunteered to swim to the boat to try to save the last man. Encouraged by his wife and the gathered crowd, he dived into the troubled waters and swam the 50 feet or more to the vessel. He was then joined by a local coastguard, John Batist. Together they reached the trapped man, and managed to carry and drag him back to shore, where they received much applause for their heroism. The rescued man was the only survivor of a crew of four from the ship. Cobb was awarded the Albert Medal of the First Class and Batist was awarded the Albert Medal of the Second Class. The street nearest to where this heroic action occurred was later named "Charles Cobb Close" in his memory.

The artist Paul Nash settled in Dymchurch in 1919, and lived there for a number of years, painting a number of important paintings, as well as producing lithographs and wood engravings, based on the sea wall and the surrounding countryside.

Dymchurch is the setting for the opening and concluding scenes of 1964 film First Men in the Moon, although these sequences were not actually filmed in the town, nor on the Moon.

== Transport ==
The main road into the village is the A259.

The Romney, Hythe and Dymchurch Railway was originally opened in the 1920s, but closed temporarily during the Second World War. Dymchurch railway station was reopened after the war by Laurel and Hardy.

=== Bus routes ===
Three main bus routes serve the area: the 100, 101 and 102 Dover to Lydd-on-Sea or Hastings via Lydd, operated by Stagecoach.

== Tourism ==
=== Beach ===
Dymchurch has a blue flag awarded sandy beach and is surrounded by flat countryside that is well suited to walking and cycling. It has two nearby holiday parks, and an amusement park with "the usual offering of Ghost Train, Dodgems, Log Flume and other rides which will keep the whole family entertained".

==== The Dr Syn Books ====
Russell Thorndike, the creator of Doctor Syn, was born on 6 February 1885 in Rochester, Kent.

Thorndike was a British actor and novelist, best known for the Dr Syn of Romney Marsh novels, and brother of renowned actress Dame Sybil Thorndike. Thorndike's first appearance on stage was in Cambridge in 1904.

In 1914, Thorndike joined the army as a trooper in the 1st Westminster Dragoons, but due to being severely wounded at Gallipoli in 1916, he was discharged and returned to acting.

Touring the US with his sister and a theatrical company, a murder took place outside their hotel. The body was left all night on the street below their window. Unable to sleep, they passed the time by telling stories. The character of Dr Syn is said to have been created that night.

Due to his successful life as both a Shakespearean actor, a writer and playwright, in 1922 Thorndike played the leading man in his own Dr Syn play, which he adapted from his books.

During his lifetime, Thorndike created and published seven Dr Syn novels; he died on 7 November 1972.

Several films featuring Dr Syn were made in and around Dymchurch, including Doctor Syn (1937) with George Arliss, Captain Clegg – the lead character was renamed for legal reasons (1962) featuring Peter Cushing, and the Disney TV film The Scarecrow of Romney Marsh (1963) with Patrick McGoohan.

Russell Thorndike was buried in the churchyard of St Peter and St Paul's Church, Dymchurch.

=== RH&DR ===
There is a railway station here, with frequent steam trains running along the Romney Hythe & Dymchurch Railway.

== Sea defences ==
Dymchurch has had a sea wall since Roman times, with the original development being constructed to protect the harbour at Port Lympne. The original structure is believed to have run for some 4 miles and to have stood 20 ft high. This wall, together with the Rhee Wall erected between New Romney and Appledore, ensured that the rich alluvial land deposited by the river Limen (Rother) which had initially been used as salt pans, slowly became rich and fertile farmland.

In July 2011, a new sea wall, built at a cost of £60 million, was officially opened by Chris Smith, Chairman of the Environment Agency. He announced that "the scheme was implemented by the Environment Agency as part of the wider Folkestone to Cliff End Sea Defence Strategy, the sea defence project which will protect 2,500 properties from flooding. The high cost of flooding underlines the importance of investment in reducing flood risk." He also added "The agency said storms and raised sea levels are due with climate change."

The wall between the High Knocke Estate and Dymchurch won a British Construction Industry Award in 2011.

The new wall allows pedestrians to walk the sea shore for the entire length of the village, approximately four miles, from Hythe Military Rifle Ranges in the East to St Mary's Bay Boundary in the West. Cyclists have the same freedom but must dismount for about 500m around the area of the public amenities. Dymchurch Wall

== Population ==
The population has grown due to large development since 2001 and is estimated at 5820 (Est 2004). The village has one primary school which was rated "requires improvement" by Ofsted in 2018. The proportion of pupils known to be eligible for free school meals is broadly average. Most pupils are of White British heritage. The proportion of pupils from minority ethnic heritages is much lower than average, as is the percentage who speak English as an additional language. The proportion of pupils with special educational needs and/or disabilities is broadly average, although in some year groups it is much higher. The school caters for children in the Early Years Foundation Stage in a Reception class. The school has about 180 pupils. (Source: OFSTED Report 2011)

== Buildings of note ==
=== The Norman church in Dymchurch ===
Dedicated to St Peter & St Paul, is classic Norman, built in about 1150. The first recorded rector was Richard de Bello in 1260. The church remained virtually unchanged for nearly 700 years. In 1821 the population of Dymchurch increased to the point where extensions and modifications were required, and the north aisle was extended and the nave re-roofed giving the church its present lop-sided appearance.

==== Commonwealth War Grave ====
The village holds one war grave from the Second World War – 1074227 Gnr Arthur William Heyhoe, 519 Coast Rgt, Royal Artillery, who is the only soldier buried in the Dymchurch cemetery under a Commonwealth War Graves Commission headstone. Arthur died, on 20 November 1940 his 28th birthday. He was serving as an anti-aircraft artillery Gunner overnight at Dover, and on the regrouping of his Battery in the morning, he was found to be 'Missing In Action', 'MIA'. His body was found later that day, having washed up on the beach at Dymchurch very close to where he is now laid to rest.

Arthur is also remembered on the war memorial at Tilney St Lawrence, Wisbech, Norfolk. Arthur's birth was recorded in Mitford, Norfolk. The local Branch of the Royal British Legion remember him every year.

== Local media ==
=== Newspapers ===
Dymchurch has two paid-for newspapers, the Romney Marsh Herald (published by Kent Regional News and Media) and the Kentish Express (published by the KM Group). Free newspapers for the area include the Folkestone and Hythe Extra, part of the KM Group, and Your Shepway, part of KOS Media.

=== Radio ===
The local radio station for Dymchurch is KMFM Shepway and White Cliffs Country. The area is also served by the county-wide stations Heart South, Gold and BBC Radio Kent. Cinque Ports Radio 100.2FM is the community radio station for Romney Marsh, Hythe and Rye and has been broadcasting since 7 March 2022. This replaced Shoreline FM which broadcast since January 2020 and is now an online radio service for Romney Marsh called Shoreline Easy
