= Rich & Cowan =

Rich & Cowan Ltd was a book publisher, based at 37 Bedford Square, London WC1. They specialized in literary books.

== Books ==
- Barbara Cartland, 1951, A Ghost in Monte Carlo.
- E Keble Chatterton, 1928, Ventures and Voyages.
- E Keble Chatterton, 1933, Through Brittany in "Charmina".
- St. John Ervine, 1933, The Theatre In My Time.
- SM and CS Fox, 1934, Goethe: a play in four acts.
- Oliver St. John Gogarty, 1937, As I was going down Sackville Street.
- Harold Weston, 1934, Form In Literature: a theory of technique and construction.
- 32 pages of advertisements for Rich and Cowan publications are printed in Form in Literature in 1939.
