= Justiniani =

Justiniani is an Italian surname. Notable people with the surname include:

- Benedetto Justiniani (1550–1622), Italian Jesuit theologian
- Nicholas Justiniani, Italian Benedictine monk and Venetian nobleman
- Pablo Justiniani (born 1952), Panamanian weightlifter
