= Nicholas Justiniani =

Nicholas Justiniani was an Italian Benedictine monk and Venetian nobleman.

Born to a noble family of Venice, Justiniani entered the monastery of San Niccoló del Lido there in 1153. When all other members of the Justiniani family died in the Aegean Sea, near Chios, during a Venetian military expedition in 1172, the government sent Baron Morosin and Toma Falier as delegates to Pope Alexander III, with the request to dispense Nicholas from his monastic vows. This was granted, and Nicholas married Anna, the daughter of Doge Michieli. Through this marriage, he founded five new lines of the Justiniani family. Shortly after 1179, he returned to the monastery. His wife took the veil at a women's convent, which they had founded, on the Island of Aniano. Both Nicholas and Anna were venerated by the people after their deaths, although neither has ever been formally beatified.
