= John of Bordeaux =

Elizabethan-era stage play

John of Bordeaux, or The Second Part of Friar Bacon, is an Elizabethan era stage play, the anonymous sequel to Robert Greene's Friar Bacon and Friar Bungay. The play was never printed in its own historical era and survived in a single, untitled, defective manuscript until it was named and published in 1936. It is usually dated to the 1590–94 period, shortly after the success of Greene's original Friar Bacon.

== Manuscript ==
The sole extant original text of John of Bordeaux is MS. 507 in the Duke of Northumberland's Library at Alnwick Castle. It gives the appearance of being a shortened version, cut down for acting; it is annotated by the hands of two prompters, one of whom also annotated the surviving MS. of Edmund Ironside.

The MS. text, with its "two missing scenes," "confused nomenclature...and seemingly abbreviated romance plot," presents a range of problems to modern editors. Its difficulties lured one scholar into the contradiction of arguing that John of Bordeaux was a "bad quarto" — that never got printed.

Among the notes added to the MS. by the prompters is the name of John Holland, an actor who was with Lord Strange's Men in the early 1590s. That company performed a Friar Bacon play on 19 February 1592. Most scholars believe that this was Greene's original Friar Bacon; yet some researchers have pointed out that since Greene's play was the property of Queen Elizabeth's Men (in 1594), it might make sense to suppose that Strange's company was acting the "second part of Friar Bacon," John of Bordeaux.

== Authorship ==
The MS. is anonymous, and critics have proposed various solutions to the authorship question. Greene himself has been a favorite candidate; at the extreme, the play has been described as "definitely of Greene's authorship" — though most commentators have not gone so far and Darren Freebury-Jones has rejected the ascription. It is noteworthy that three of the play's characters have names that derive from the Rosalynde (1590) of Thomas Lodge; Lodge collaborated with Greene on the play A Looking Glass for London (c. 1590). If Greene authored the play, it must have been written, or at least begun, before his 1592 death. The MS. "contains one speech in the hand of Henry Chettle, obvious written to supply a lacuna...."

== Plot ==
The plot of John of Bordeaux depends heavily on that of the original Friar Bacon. The setting shifts to Germany from England, where Bacon is visiting the Emperor's court. Ferdinand, the son of Emperor Frederick II, fulfills the role of Prince Edward in the earlier play: Ferdinand lusts after a woman named Rossalin, just as Edward pursues Margaret. Rossalin, unlike Margaret, is married, to John of Bordeaux, the commander of the Emperor's armies in his war against the Turks. Ferdinand's pursuit of Rossalin is much harsher and more ruthless than that of Edward's of Margaret: Rossalin is disgraced, deprived of her home, reduced to beggary, imprisoned, and even threatened with death.

Vandermast, the villainous magician from FBFB, returns in the sequel for a series of contests of magic with Bacon — which Bacon consistently wins. Though the manuscript text is defective toward the end of the story, it is clear that Bacon brings about a happy ending, with the restoration of John and Rossalin to their prior good fortune and the exposure and repentance of Ferdinand. Bacon's English servant Perce constitutes the center of the play's comic relief in the subplot, as Bacon's servant Miles does in the original play. Among his other stunts, Perce gets German scholars to trade their copies of the works of Plato and Aristotle for a couple of bottles of wine.

The story in John of Bordeaux bears some resemblance to that in the anonymous A Knack to Know an Honest Man (1594), which was a sequel to the earlier A Knack to Know a Knave (1592). Greene, among others, has been proposed as the author of A Knack to Know a Knave.
