= 1592 in literature =

This article contains information about the literary events and publications of 1592.

== Events ==
- February 5–7 – Ulysses Redux, a Latin play by William Gager, is staged by members of Christ Church, Oxford. Two days later, they revive Gager's 1583 Latin play Rivales (now lost).
- February 26 – The first firmly recorded performance of Christopher Marlowe's The Jew of Malta is given by Lord Strange's Men in London.
- June 23 – The London theatres close and apart from a brief spell around January 1593 remain so for about 16 months due to an epidemic of bubonic plague.
- September 3 – The English writer Robert Greene dies in London of a "banquet of Rhenish wine and pickled herring", having apparently completed Greene's Groats-Worth of Wit (published soon after), including a reference to "an upstart Crow, beautified with our feathers", taken to be the first published (critical) reference to Shakespeare as a playwright.
- September 26 – Rivales is performed again by members of Christ Church, with Queen Elizabeth I of England in the audience, during her second visit to the University of Oxford.
- October–December – Pembroke's Men, an English playing company, is known to be in existence, acting in Leicester and at Court in London.
- November 9 – The Sixto-Clementine Vulgate is promulgated.
- December 18 – An entry in the Stationers' Register may refer to Marlowe's Doctor Faustus, perhaps marking the year of its first performance.

== New books ==
=== Prose ===
- Antonio Agustin – Dialoghi intorno alle medaglie inscrittioni et attre antichità, with woodcuts by Geronima Parasole (the first known printed book with illustrations by a woman)
- Isaac Casaubon – New edition of Theophrastus's Characteres
- Blaise de Montluc (died 1577) – Commentaires de Messire Blaise de Montluc
- 'P. F.' (translator) – The Historie of the Damnable Life, and Deserved Death of Doctor Iohn Faustus
- Robert Greene (died September 3)
  - The Black Books Messenger
  - A Disputation Between a Hee Conny-Catcher and a Shee Conny-Catcher
  - The Third and Last Part of Conycatching
  - Greene's Groats-Worth of Wit, Bought with a Million of Repentance
  - Greene's Vision, Written at the Instant of his Death
  - Philomela
  - A Quip for an Upstart Courtier
- Muhammad al-Idrisi (died 1165) – De geographia universali or Kitāb Nuzhat al-mushtāq fī dhikr al-amṣār wa-al-aqṭār wa-al-buldān wa-al-juzur wa-al-madā’ in wa-al-āfāq
- Richard Johnson – Nine Worthies of London
- Lucas Janszoon Waghenaer – Thresoor der Zeevaert (Treasure of navigation)
- Hieronymous Megiser – Dictionarium quatuor linguarum
- Anonymous (possibly Thomas Kyd) – The Murder of John Brewen
- Wu Cheng'en (died 1580/2; attributed) – Journey to the West (Xī Yóu Jì)

=== Drama ===
- Anonymous (variously attributed to Thomas Kyd, William Shakespeare and/or Christopher Marlowe) – Arden of Faversham (published)
- Anonymous – A Knack to Know a Knave
- William Gager – Ulysses Redux (Latin)
- Thomas Kyd – The Spanish Tragedy (undated first printing, almost certainly between October and December in this year; first performed around 1587; first recorded performance November in this year)
- John Lyly – Gallathea and Midas published
- Christopher Marlowe – Edward II
- Thomas Nashe – Summer's Last Will and Testament
- William Shakespeare – The Taming of the Shrew (approximate date)

=== Poetry ===
- Henry Constable – Diana
- Michael Drayton – The Shepherd's Garland
- Gabriel Harvey – Foure Letters and certaine Sonnets

== Births ==
- January 16 (baptised) – Henry King, English poet and bishop (died 1669)
- January 22 – Pierre Gassendi, French philosopher and scientist (died 1655)
- March 28 – John Amos Comenius (Jan Amos Komenský), Czech teacher and writer (died 1670)
- April 4 – Abraham Elzevir, Dutch printer (died 1652)
- May 8 – Francis Quarles, English poet (died 1644)
- July 10 – Pierre d'Hozier, French historian (died 1660)
- August 1 – François le Métel de Boisrobert, French poet (died 1662)

== Deaths ==
- July 22 – Ludwig Rabus, German Lutheran theologian (born 1523)
- September 3 – Robert Greene, English writer (born 1558)
- September 13 – Michel de Montaigne, French essayist (born 1533)
- September 26 (burial) – Thomas Watson, English lyric poet writing in English and Latin (born 1555)
