= 1558 in literature =

List of years in literature	(table)
- … 1548; 1549; 1550; 1551; 1552; 1553; 1554; 1555; 1556; 1557; 1558; 1559; 1560; 1561; 1562; 1563; 1564; 1565; 1566; 1567; 1568 …
- Art; Archaeology; Architecture; Literature; Music; Philosophy; Science; +...

Events from the year 1558 in literature.

== Events ==
- November 17 – The Elizabethan era begins in England: the Catholic Queen Mary dies and is succeeded by her Protestant half-sister Elizabeth.
- unknown dates
  - Albert V, Duke of Bavaria, sets up in his Munich Residenz a court library that is the predecessor of the Bavarian State Library, with the collection of the late Johann Albrecht Widmannstetter at its core.
  - Italian exile Pietro Perna sets up his printing press in Basel, Switzerland.

== New books ==
=== Prose ===
- John Dee – Propaedeumata Aphoristica
- Ser Giovanni Fiorentino – Il Pecorone (The Simpleton)
- John Knox (published anonymously) – The first blast of the trumpet against the monstruous regiment of women
- Marguerite de Navarre (died 1549) – Heptaméron (Histoires des amans fortunez) (edited by Pierre Boaistuau)
- Giambattista della Porta – Magia Naturalis
- Thomas Watson – Holsome and Catholyke Doctryne concerninge the Seven Sacramentes of Chrystes Church

=== Drama ===
- Jacques Grévin – La Trésorière

=== Poetry ===
- See 1558 in poetry

== Births ==
- July 11 (baptism) – Robert Greene, English writer (died 1592)
- November 3 – Thomas Kyd, English dramatist (died 1594)
- Probable year – Thomas Lodge, English writer (died 1625)

== Deaths ==
- January 28 – Jacob Micyllus, German writer (born 1503)
- May 17 – Francisco de Sá de Miranda, Portuguese poet (born 1481)
- August 11 – Justus Menius, German Lutheran theologian (born 1499)
- September 5 – Robert Broke, English legal writer (birth date unknown)
- October 14 – Mellin de Saint-Gelais, French poet (born c. 1491)
