= Greene's Groats-Worth of Wit =

1592 tract by Robert Greene

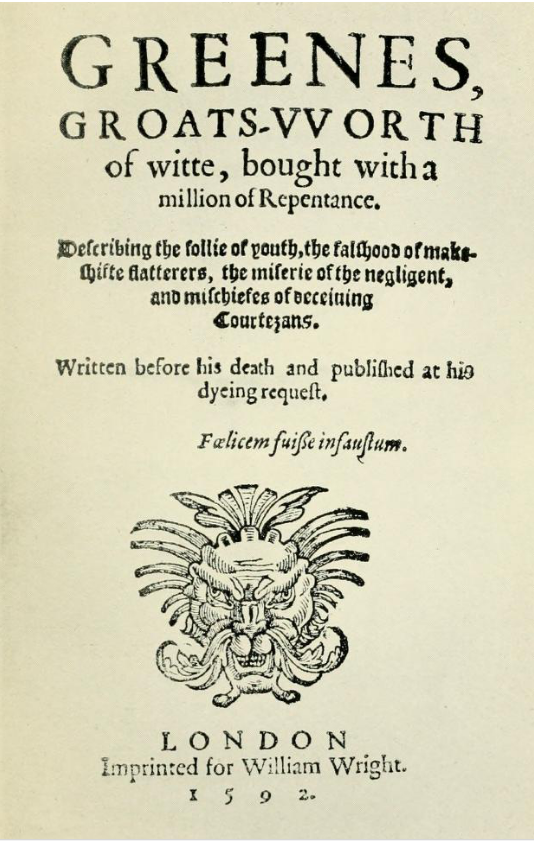
Title page of Greene's Groats-worth of Wit 1592

Greenes, Groats-worth of Witte, bought with a million of Repentance (1592) is a tract published as the work of the Elizabethan author Robert Greene.

It was published as a short book or pamphlet, a form that was popular and which contributed to the lively intellectual life of the time. Greene's work is written as a moralistic tale, which, towards the end, is revealed to have been autobiographical. During the course of the story characters introduce song lyrics, fables, and some sharp and resentful criticisms of actors and playwrights. It appears to have been written with the idea that the contemporary reader would try to figure out which actual persons are being represented and satirised by the characters in the story.

The pamphlet is most famous for a passage which appears to allude to William Shakespeare, who was then starting out on his career as an actor and playwright.

The main body of the text is an account of the visit of two brothers, Roberto and Lucanio, to the courtesan Lamilia. This is followed by the later career of Roberto as a playwright.

The actual authorship of the pamphlet has been disputed. Some authorities consider it to be wholly by Greene himself. Others take the view that it is a heavily revised compilation of material left by him. It has also been attributed to the writer and printer Henry Chettle, who arranged its publication.

== Publication ==
Groatsworth was entered in the Stationers' Register 'upon the peril of Henry Chettle' on 20 September 1592, two and a half weeks after Greene's death on 3 September:

xxo die Septembr – Willm. Wrighte. Entred for his copie under Mr Watkin’s hand, uppon the perill of Henrye Chettle, a booke intituled Greene’s Groatsworth of wyt, bought with a million of Repentance . . .vjd

It was printed for Wright by John Danter and John Wolfe. Chettle, who had entered into partnership with Danter and William Hoskins in 1591, and who continued to work for Danter for several years after the partnership dissolved, claimed in a prefatory epistle to Kind-Heart's Dream (1592) that, because Greene's handwriting was illegible, he (Chettle) had copied out Greene's manuscript so that the work could be licensed.

The publication caused "a literary scandal" because of its comments about other playwrights. The booklet was one of several publications that followed Greene's death, occasioned by fascination with his dissolute lifestyle. Others written in the first person purporting to be his dying statements were The Repentance of Robert Greene and Greene's Vision.

Groatsworth was reprinted by Thomas Creede in 1596.

== Contents ==
The pamphlet begins with an account of the brothers Roberto and Lucanio Gorinius, sons of a wealthy usurer. Roberto is a scholar, while Lucanio is being groomed to take over the family business. After their father dies, leaving Roberto only a groat to buy a "groat's worth of wit", Roberto takes his now wealthy brother to visit the dazzling courtesan Lamilia. Lucanio is enchanted with her. The characters tell fables and comic anecdotes and sing songs. Roberto attempts to make a deal with Lamilia to share the proceeds if she can fleece the naive Lucanio, but Lamilia tells Lucanio about his brother's proposal and kicks Roberto out of the house. Roberto then meets an actor who tells Roberto that he can make a living as a playwright.

Two years later Roberto is a successful playwright and Lucanio is penniless, having spent all the money he inherited on Lamilia, who has now discarded him. Roberto employs his brother, but Lucanio leaves and spends the remainder of his life as a pimp. Roberto's success does not stop him from squandering all of his money. As he is left dying, he once again finds himself with just one groat left.

The narrator then states that the life of Roberto is similar to his own, and exhorts his readers to follow a more honourable path, summed up in ten precepts. He then addresses three unnamed "Gentlemen his Quondam acquaintance, that spend their wits in making Plaies", telling them to reform their ways. One is referred to as a "famous gracer of Tragedians" who has denied the existence of God. The other is a "young Juvenal" who co-wrote a comedy with Greene. The third is "no lesse deserving than the other two" but has been driven to "extreme shifts" to survive. All should beware of actors and newcomers, especially "an upstart Crow, beautified with our feathers, that with his Tygers hart wrapt in a Players hyde, supposes he is as well able to bombast out a blanke verse as the best of you: and being an absolute Iohannes fac totum, is in his owne conceit the onely Shake-scene in a countrey."

The pamphlet continues with further exhortations to repentance followed by an allegory about a grasshopper and an ant, the former representing fecklessness, the latter representing thrift. The text ends with a letter to his wife, which is said to have been found after Greene's death. Greene apologises to her for his neglect and exhorts her to look after their son.

== Identities of the playwrights ==
=== Shakespeare reference ===
The comment about an "upstart crow beautified with our feathers" is generally accepted as a reference to Shakespeare, who is criticised as an actor who has the temerity to write plays (absolute Iohannes factotum), and is possibly taken to task for plagiarism or excessive pride. The line in Groatsworth, "Tygers hart wrapt in a Players hyde", alludes to Shakespeare's Henry VI, Part 3 (written c. in 1591), which contains the line "O tiger's heart wrapped in a woman's hide". (I, iv, 137). (Note: The line also appears in The True Tragedy of Richard, Duke of York (published 1595), a version of 3 Henry VI (B2 v line 17). Schoone-Jongen, Terence G., Shakespeare's Companies, (Farnham, Surrey: Ashgate Publishing, 2008), p. 28.) If the "upstart crow" comment is accepted as a reference to Shakespeare, it is the first documented reference to Shakespeare since 1585, except for a passing reference to him in a 1588 lawsuit involving his father.

Scholars are not agreed as to what Greene meant by his cryptic comments or what motivated them. Greene complains of an actor who thinks he can write as well as university-educated playwrights, he alludes to a line in Shakespeare's Henry VI, Part 3, and he uses the term "Shake-scene," a term never used prior to Groatsworth. Most scholars agree that Greene had Shakespeare in mind, who in 1592 would have been an "upstart" actor writing and contributing to plays such as the three parts of Henry VI and Richard III, all of which were likely written and produced (although not published) prior to Greene's death. Hanspeter Born has argued that Greene's attack on the "upstart Crow" was provoked because, in his view, Shakespeare may have rewritten parts of Greene's play A Knack to Know a Knave. Believing that Thomas Nashe is "by far the stronger suspect" for having written the passage regarding the "upstart Crow", Katherine Duncan-Jones points to instances in which Nashe may have had reason to be provoked.

Baldwin Maxwell and Stephen Greenblatt have speculated that Greene was the model for Shakespeare's Falstaff. Greenblatt has also suggested that a line in Hamlet is a dig at Greene's phrase in Groatsworth, "beautified with our feathers". Polonius, reading a letter from Hamlet addressed to "the most beautified Ophelia", comments disparagingly that "beautified is a vile phrase". Jenny Sager calls the suggestion that Falstaff was based on Greene fanciful and "cringe-worthy".

Some anti-Stratfordians have argued that the reference to the 'Upstart Crow' who was also a 'Shake-scene' applies to the famous Elizabethan actor Edward Alleyn.

=== The three other writers ===
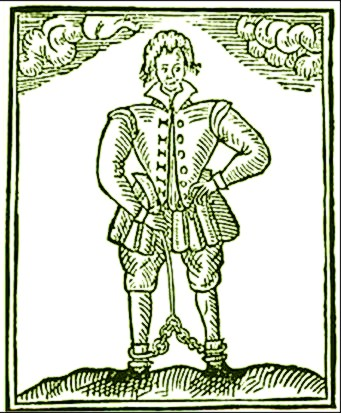
The three university-educated playwrights addressed by Greene were all notorious for their disreputable lifestyles: a polemical woodcut deriding Thomas Nashe as a jailbird in chains, from Richard Lichfield's The Trimming of Thomas Nashe, Gentleman (1597).

The three playwrights whom Greene admonishes were members of a coterie of university-educated writers associated with Greene known as the University Wits. The "famous gracer of Tragedians" is generally taken to refer to Christopher Marlowe, educated at Corpus Christi College, Cambridge, who was accused of atheism. Greene comments that he is an admirer of Machiavelli, who is several times mentioned in Marlowe's work.

It was once commonly argued that "young Juvenal" was Thomas Lodge, co-author with Greene of the comedy A Looking Glass for London; however, Lodge was out of England at the time, and Greene's language implies that all three playwrights were aware of Greene's illness. Most modern commentators now agree that Greene had in mind Thomas Nashe, educated at St John's College, Cambridge, later called "gallant young Juvenal" by Francis Meres in Palladis Tamia, an apparent allusion to Greene's earlier use of the epithet. Greene's phrase "bombast out a blank verse" appears to be an allusion to a remark by Nashe in the preface to Greene's Menaphon (1589) in which Nashe defended Greene against his detractors, who "out-brave better pens with the swelling bumbast of a bragging blanke verse". Nashe was also much younger than Greene, unlike Lodge, which would explain why Greene calls him "sweet boy". However, there are no known comedies co-written by Greene and Nashe.

The third writer is usually identified as George Peele, educated at Christ Church, Oxford, who, like Greene, was notorious for his chaotic lifestyle. Peele may already have collaborated with Shakespeare; the early play Titus Andronicus is now generally taken to have been co-written by them.

Both Peele and Nashe may also have worked with Shakespeare on Henry VI, Part 1. According to Gary Taylor there is considerable evidence for Nashe's dominant role in the authorship of the first act of the play.

== Authorship ==
Some scholars hypothesize that all or part of Groats-Worth was written shortly after Greene's death by one of his fellow writers. Henry Chettle has been the favoured candidate, and was suspected at the time, since the manuscript from which it was printed was prepared by him and was in his handwriting. The publication offended at least two contemporary writers. Chettle responded to the complaints in the preface to his Kind Heart's Dream, published later that year. He denied writing the work, stating that he had only transcribed it from Greene's original manuscript into his own hand before publication. He added that he had no wish to know one of the complainants, but wished he had edited out some of the offensive material about the second. It is widely believed that the two authors he comments on are Christopher Marlowe and Shakespeare, though this is far from certain. Chettle wrote,

About three months since died M. Robert Greene, leaving many papers in sundry booksellers' hands, among other his Groatsworth of Wit, in which a letter written to divers play-makers is offensively by one or two of them taken, and because on the dead they cannot be avenged, they willfully forge in their conceits a living author [...] With neither of them that take offence was I acquainted, and with one of them I care not if I never be. The other, whom at that time I did not so much spare as since I wish I had, for that, as I have moderated the heat of living writers and might have used my own discretion (especially in such a case, the author being dead), that I did not I am as sorry as if the original fault had been my fault, because myself have seen his demeanor no less civil than he excellent in the quality he professes. Besides, divers of worship have reported his uprightness of dealing, which argues his honesty, and his facetious grace in writing that approves his art.

Thomas Nashe was also accused at the time of having written it. He denied it in the 1592 edition of his book Pierce Penniless, calling the work a "scald, trivial lying pamphlet".

In 1969 Warren B. Austin undertook a pioneering computer-aided analysis of the work of Chettle and Greene. He concluded that Groats-Worth was written by Chettle on the basis of word choice frequencies. Austin's analysis convinced many scholars, but in 2006 Richard Westley came to the opposite conclusion, accusing Austin of selecting evidence to support his view. Westley concluded that the pamphlet was the work of Greene and that the evidence of Chettle's quirks was the result of his role as a transcriber. Steve Mentz, writing in 2008, argued that Groats-Worth included a substantial amount of material written by Greene, but that its idiosyncratic structure suggested that there was significant editorial intervention in the source material creating "an unusual sort of collaboration" between Chettle and Greene.
