= Selimus (play) =

Tragic play attributed to Greene and Lodge

Selimus, or The Tragedy of Selimus, Sometime Emperor of the Turks, is a dramatic tragedy generally attributed to the authors Robert Greene and Thomas Lodge. It is an early example of a "Turk play", which became a popular dramatic subject during the English Renaissance. Published in 1594, the play is loosely – and historically inaccurately – based on Selim I, a real Emperor of the Ottoman Empire in the 1500s.

The play centres on Selimus, who is the youngest son of Bajazet, the current Emperor of Turkey, and how he plans to take the crown away from his father. The play follows the family turmoil that ensues as Selimus, Acomat, and Corcut, all sons of Bajazet, war and murder in an attempt to control the crown. Nearly all of Bajazet's line of descent is eradicated by the end of the play, and Selimus is left to rule as Emperor of Turkey.

== Genre ==
This play is clearly a tragedy: throughout the course of this play, twelve named characters die, either by the hand of Acomat, Selimus, or self-imbibed poison. Most of these characters are part of Bajazet's family tree, and the only family members left at the end of the play are Selimus and Acomat's two sons Alladin and Amurath. In addition to this family tragedy, Acomat is said to have killed 6,000 citizens of Natolia.

Selimus is also remnant of a history play. The character of Selimus is based on the Ottoman Sultan named Selim I, who ruled the Empire between 1512 and 1520 and conquered North Africa and parts of the Arabian Peninsula during his reign. According to the Database of Early English Playbooks (DEEP), the genre of the play is "heroical romance."

== Performance and Publication ==
=== Performance ===
The acting company Queen Elizabeth's Men was the first to perform Selimus in 1592. Little is known about the venue where the play was performed, how it was received by its audience, or any subsequent productions of the play.

=== Publication ===
The first print edition of the play was published anonymously in 1594. The text from the original title page is shown below:

THE First part of the Tragicall raigne of Selimus, sometime Emperour of the Turkes, and grandfather to him that now raigneth. Wherein is showne how hee most vnnaturally raised warres against his owne father Baiazet, and preuailing therein, in the end caused him to be poysoned: Also with the murthering of his two brethren, Corcut, and Acomat.

As it was played by the Queenes Maiesties Players.

LONDON Printed by Thomas Creede, dwelling in Thames streete at the signe of the Kathren wheele, neare the olde Swanne. 1594

It was not until the edition was reissued in 1638 that the title page's information was heavily reworked and the play's authorship was attributed to a writer by the initials T.G. These initials suggested that the play's author was Thomas Goffe, a playwright active in the 1630s who also wrote plays about Turks, but Thomas Goffe was just three years old when the first edition of this play was published. The title page of the second edition of Selimus also featured a different play title, different performance attributions, and different publishers on the title page. The first edition of the play had featured a prologue but reissue omits it. Later editions of the play, including most notably the 1898 edition, reinsert the prologue in the play.

== Authorship ==
The work of the Scottish clergyman Alexander Balloch Grosart has been crucial to determining the true authorship of Selimus. It was in Grosart's 1898 reprinting of Selimus that he "reclaimed" the play as that of Robert Greene and included the play in the collected works of the playwright. He posits that the initials T.G. on the 1638 title page might have been an "unlucky misprint for R.G." Grosart used analyses of word usage and sentence composition to further link Selimus to Robert Greene. (See Preface to the 1898 edition and Life of Robert Greene vol. i of Works, pp. lxxi – lxxvii). It is possible that Robert Greene did not write Selimus alone; further "linguistic analysis indicates, however, that Selimus' co-author was [Thomas] Lodge," an ascription supported by rigorous testing conducted by Darren Freebury-Jones.

== Dramatis Personae ==
The first edition of the play did not include a dramatis personae. Later editions included a character list that was taken directly from the character appearances in the play.

- Bajazet, the capable Emperor of Turkey but the various threats posed by his sons to the crown make him weary; he tries to protect the crown against the lustful ambitions of Acomat and Selimus but eventually knows he can no longer hold out against the power of Selimus.
- Selimus (or Selim), the youngest son of Bajazet, he makes no attempt to hide his ambitions for the emperorship of Turkey at the beginning of the play, yet later he is deceptive enough to convince Bajazet he has changed his ways. He has a strong support group made of janissaries and once he is in power he kills nearly all in his way.
- Acomat, son of Bajazet and the presumed choice to take the crown upon Bajazet's death, he had been living a life of pleasure and luxury until Selimus begins to make threats for the crown. He becomes very violent and kills many in an attempt to remove any opponents for the crown.
- Corcut, the oldest living son of Bajazet, he disguised himself as a shepherd to hide from Selimus. He converts to Christianity and then warns Selimus to stop his cruelty and destruction and repent while he still can.
- Mustaffa, the highest official to Bajazet, he remains loyal to him to the end even though he believes Selimus is the only viable candidate to take the crown and stop the warring of Acomat. He warns Acomat’s sons Alladin and Amurath that Selimus means to kill them and by consequence is murdered by Selimus for this “act of betrayal”.
- Aga, messenger to Bajazet, he often acts as the voice of reason against the tyrants of the play, Aga suffers greatly at the hand of Acomat, who puts out his eyes and then chops off his hands before sending Aga back to Bajazet.
- Cherseoli
- Sinam Bishaw
- Hali Binshaw
- Prince Mahomet, son of Bajazet's eldest son Alemshae (deceased)
- Ottrante
- Occhiali
- Regan, Acomat's messenger
- Tonombey, a great warrior
- Vizier
- Belierbey, of Natolia
- Alladin, son of Acomat
- Amurath, son of Acomat
- Zanora, sister to Prince Mahomet
- Solyma, sister to Selimus, wife to Mustaffa
- Queen Amasia, wife of Acomat
- Abraham, the Jew
- Janissaries, soldiers, messengers, page
- Bullithrumble, a shepherd

== Plot ==
The play begins with Bajazet, the Emperor of Turkey, expressing suspicions that he is in danger because his son Selimus strongly covets the title of Emperor for himself. Once Selimus confirms those suspicions, Bajazet gives his son rule over Smederevo in an effort to appease him. Bajazet then flees to Byzantium to protect the crown. Selimus follows his father there and reveals that he plans to kill his own brothers as well in order to make sure the crown is his. Bajazet defeats Selimus's military attempts against him, but Selimus vows to take revenge against his father.

Prior to the beginning of the play, Bajazet's eldest son Alemshae was killed by Ottrante, a supporter of Selimus. Had he been alive, Alemshae would have been the rightful successor to the throne and thus Bajazet laments his death. When Cherseoli, an advisor to Bajazet, fights with Ottrante, the one who murdered Alemshae, Cherseoli ends up dying in combat but Ottrante is sentenced to death by Bajazet after they hold him as a prisoner.

Meanwhile, Bajazet's other two sons, Corcut and Acomat, both are making their own efforts for the crown. After long leading a life focused solely on pleasure and luxury, Acomat wants to refocus on the crown. He personally heads to Byzantium while both he and Corcut send appeals for the crown as well. Several close supporters and advisors of Bajazet believe that Selimus is the only viable candidate to take over the throne but they promise themselves they will serve Bajazet loyally until his death.

Of his remaining sons, Bajazet had planned to give the crown to Acomat but then changes his mind to Corcut, who is the oldest living son of his. In response, Acomat goes to Natolia to first erase the brethren of his deceased brother Alemshae by throwing the son, Prince Mahomet, over the castle walls onto awaiting spears. Next he strangles Prince Mahomet's sister Zanora, before proceeding to ruthlessly murder 6,000 residents of Natolia. He even pulls out the eyes and cuts the hands off Bajazet's messenger named Aga.

When Aga returns to Bajazet, Mustaffa convinces Bajazet that they need to fight against Acomat and that Selimus – of all people – is the only person capable of leading the army. Selimus feigns that he has changed his sly, subversive ways and convinces his father that he no longer lusts after the crown. Bajazet is naively convinced and when, soon after, there are shouts of "Long live Selimus the Emperor of Turks" from Selimus's janissaries (supporters), Bajazet simply gives up the crown knowing he can no longer save it.

Following the transfer of the crown, Bajazet simply wants to retire in peace. Selimus has different plans for him though and hires a Jew named Abraham to concoct a poison that Bajazet eventually drinks and dies from, along with Aga and the Jew himself, who also drink the liquid. Selimus begins his war efforts against his brothers and first plans to kill Corcut. After capturing his brother who had been disguised as a shepherd, Selimus does kill Corcut. Before his death Corcut tells of how he has converted to Christianity and he warns Selimus that he should repent for his sins before it is too late.

Selimus then sets his sights on Acomat by first laying siege to the city of Amasia, where Acomat's queen resides. She is captured and murdered by Selimus. Mustaffa, still loyal to the now deceased Bajazet, sends word to Acomat's sons Alladin and Amurath that Selimus plans to kill them too. They are able to escape from Amasia but Mustaffa and his wife Solyma (who is also the sister of Selimus) are both murdered for their betrayal in Selimus's eyes.

Selimus then challenges his brother Acomat to a duel. Tonombey, an Egyptian warrior, taunts Selimus by saying that Acomat can easily beat him in such combat. Selimus then proceeds to strike down Tonombey twice before capturing Acomat and strangling him. With this final murder, Selimus has achieved the complete decimation of his own family. He promises to use the upcoming winter season to rest and prepare for the spring, during which he will launch campaigns to take the crown in Egypt, Persia, and Arabia.

== Themes ==
=== The Cruelty of Turks ===
Selimus was written during a time in Europe when the threat of the Turks was very real. "The stage representations of Turkish and Islamic power took place during a time when the Turkish Empire was expanding rapidly throughout Europe." As a consequence of this, we see Selimus and many other characters in the play represented as bloodthirsty murderers which was befitting for the English perspective of the Turks.

The author(s) of Selimus may even have tweaked the true history of Selim I in order to emphasize the "cruelty of the Turks." For example, it is not true that Bajazet was murdered by his Selimus, nor that he was poisoned. In Greene's version of history as represented in his play, however, these are both critical parts of the plot. For the English, the threat of the Turks would have been very real and this play would have reinforced their fears.

=== Questions of Filial Duty and the Role of the Monarch ===
Acomat It is the greatest glory of a king
When, though his subjects hate his wicked deeds,
Yet are they forc’d to bear them all with praise.
Aga Whom fear constrains to praise their prince's deeds,
That fear eternal hatred in them feeds.
Acomat He knows not how to sway the kingly mace,
That loves to be great in his people's grace :
The surest ground for kings to build upon,
Is to be fear’d and curs’d of every one.
What, though the world of nations me hate?
Hate is peculiar to a prince's state.
Aga Where there's no shame, no care of holy law,
No faith, no justice, no integrity,
That state is full of mutability.

With Aga acting as the voice of reason here, his rational viewpoint contrasts strongly with the sentiments Acomat expresses. Selimus holds similar ideas since neither of the brothers are troubled by committing murder of family members or anyone who gets in their way. This ruthlessness would have furthered the "cruel Turk" mindset for the English, who perceived the Turk people to be inferior to Europeans and certainly more barbaric.

== Structure ==
Unlike most dramatic works, Selimus is divided neither into acts nor official scenes; the text runs from line 1 to line 2572 without having a clear stop. There are twenty-nine unnumbered fairly short "scenes", which are marked by "[Exeunt all]" at which point the stage is cleared and new characters enter the stage beginning on the next line.

== Modern Editions ==
The play has recently been edited by Mathew Martin for Broadview Press and by Kirk Melnikoff for Queen's Men Editions. The latter edition can be found here: https://lemdo.uvic.ca/qme/emdSel_edition.html.
