= Thomas Bungay =

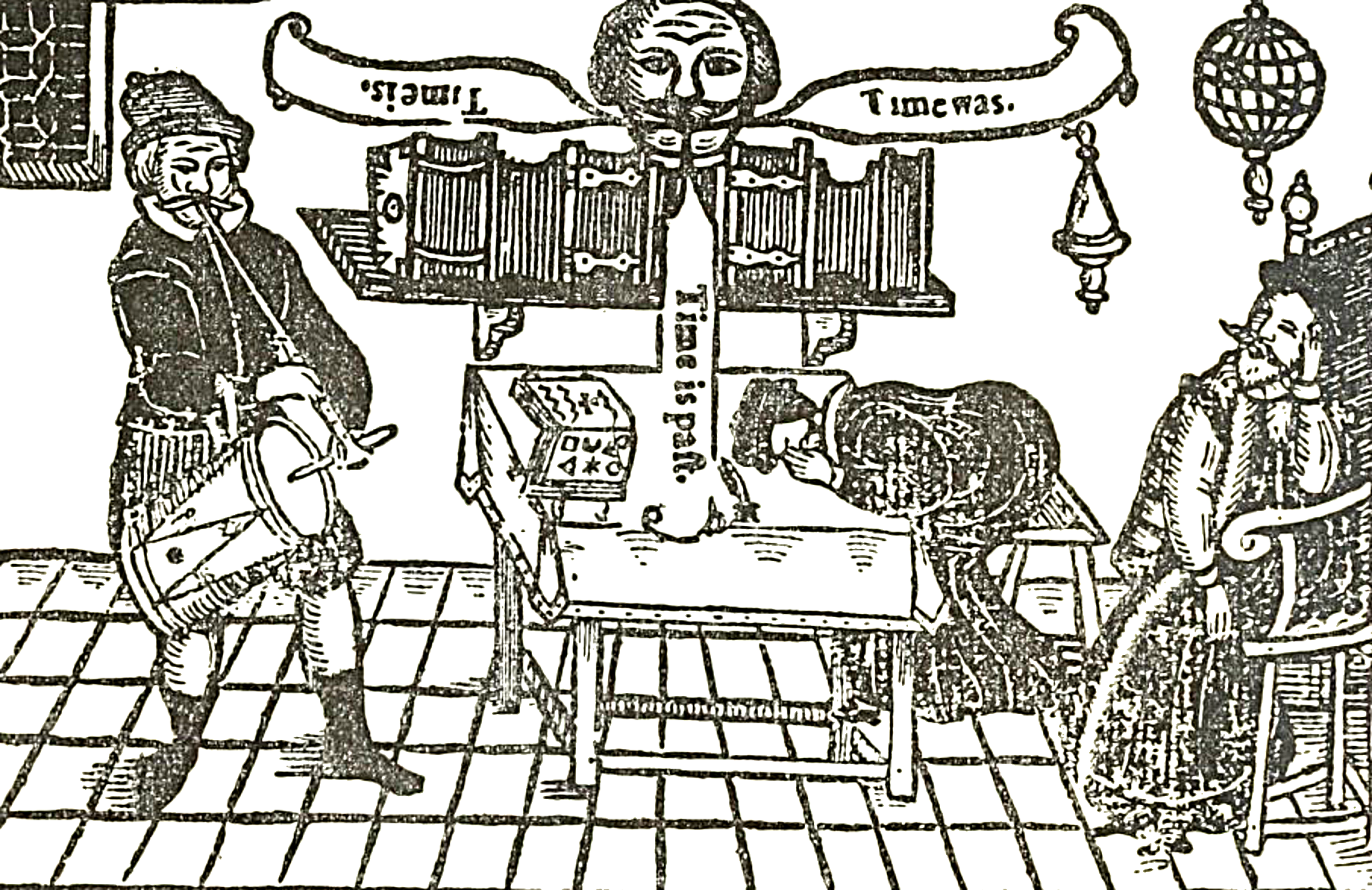
Friars Bacon and Bungay sleep through the activation of their brazen head while their manservant Miles plays a pipe and drum.

Thomas Bungay (Latin: Thomas Bungeius or Bungeyensis; c. 1214 – c. 1294), also known as Thomas of Bungay (Latin: Thomas de Bungeya; French: Thomas de Bungeye) and formerly also known as Friar Bongay, was an English Franciscan friar, scholar, and alchemist.

== Life ==
Thomas was born in Bungay, a market town in Suffolk. He was educated at Oxford and Paris in the mid-13th century and, at an unknown date, entered the Order of the Friars Minor (Franciscans) at Norwich. He lectured as the 10th Franciscan "Reader in Divinity" at Oxford, certainly in the years 1270–72, before leaving to serve as the 8th Minister Provincial of the Franciscans in England during the years 1272–75. (He was succeeded at Oxford by John Peckham.) From around 1275 to at least 1283, he served as the 15th Franciscan master at Cambridge. He wrote Quaestio in Aristotelis de Caelo et Mundo, a commentary on Gerard's edition of Aristotle's work On the Heavens. Other questions are attributed to him in MS Assisi 158, in the Palazzo Giacobetti in Assisi. He died at Northampton, England.

Despite their roughly contemporaneous studies and later legends, no real evidence of a relationship between Bungay and Roger Bacon has yet been discovered.

== Legend ==
He is better known from later English legend, which made him Roger Bacon's sidekick in the stories that developed around that scholar's knowledge of alchemy and supposed mastery of magic. In some versions, he is killed by the German mage Vandermast.

The most famous version of the legend is the Elizabethan play Friar Bacon and Friar Bungay by Robert Greene.

Bungay may owe his magical reputation to a separate Friar Bungay, who seems to have been a magician in the 15th century.

== Legacy ==
Bungay serves a similar sidekick role in Doctor Mirabilis, James Blish's fictional biography of Roger Bacon.
