= Low-life =

Person who is rebuked by society

Low-life (pl. low-lifes or low-lives; also lowlife) is a pejorative term for a person who is of low social status or low moral character. Examples of individuals typically referred to as low-life include, criminals, drug dealers, animal abusers, vandals, alcoholics, gangsters, sex offenders, sex traffickers, aggressive panhandlers, scammers, and thieves.

Often, the term is used as an indication of disapproval of antisocial or self-destructive behaviors, usually bearing a connotation of contempt and derision. This usage of the word dates to 1911. The long-term origins of the ideas behind this in the Western world trace back to ancient times with the distinction of high culture associated with aristocracy at the top of the social hierarchy who were regarded in aristocrat-dominated society as compared with low culture associated with commoners at the bottom of the social hierarchy that included many impoverished people among them.

In common usage, the term can also be used for people associated with adhering to low culture, or used to describe a crass, overly casual person who exhibits a lack of grace and refinement. In this sense, individuals do not necessarily need to be criminally destructive or hold ethically questionable views to qualify for the term.

Similar terms used for the same type of person include the Australian/New Zealand term feral.

== Reputation ==
Upwardly mobile members of an ethnic group, committed to schooling, education and employment prospects, will often reject low-lifes who instead opt (willingly or unwillingly) for street or gang life.

== Attraction ==
The lure of the low-life for those in established social strata has been a perennial feature of western history: it can be traced from the Neronian aristocrat described by Juvenal as only at home in stables and taverns–"you'll find him near a gangster, cheek by jowl, mingling with lascars, thieves and convicts on the run"–through the Elizabethan interest in cony-catching, up to William Burroughs' obsession with the hobo, bum, or urban outlaw, and through to the anti-heroes of Cyberpunk.

Such interest may have a sexual component, based on the subconscious equation of socially low status with lack of inhibitions, as with the Roman ladies described by Petronius: "Some women get heated up over the very dregs and can't feel any passion unless... among the lowest of the low".
