= University Wits =

Group of late 16th century English playwrights

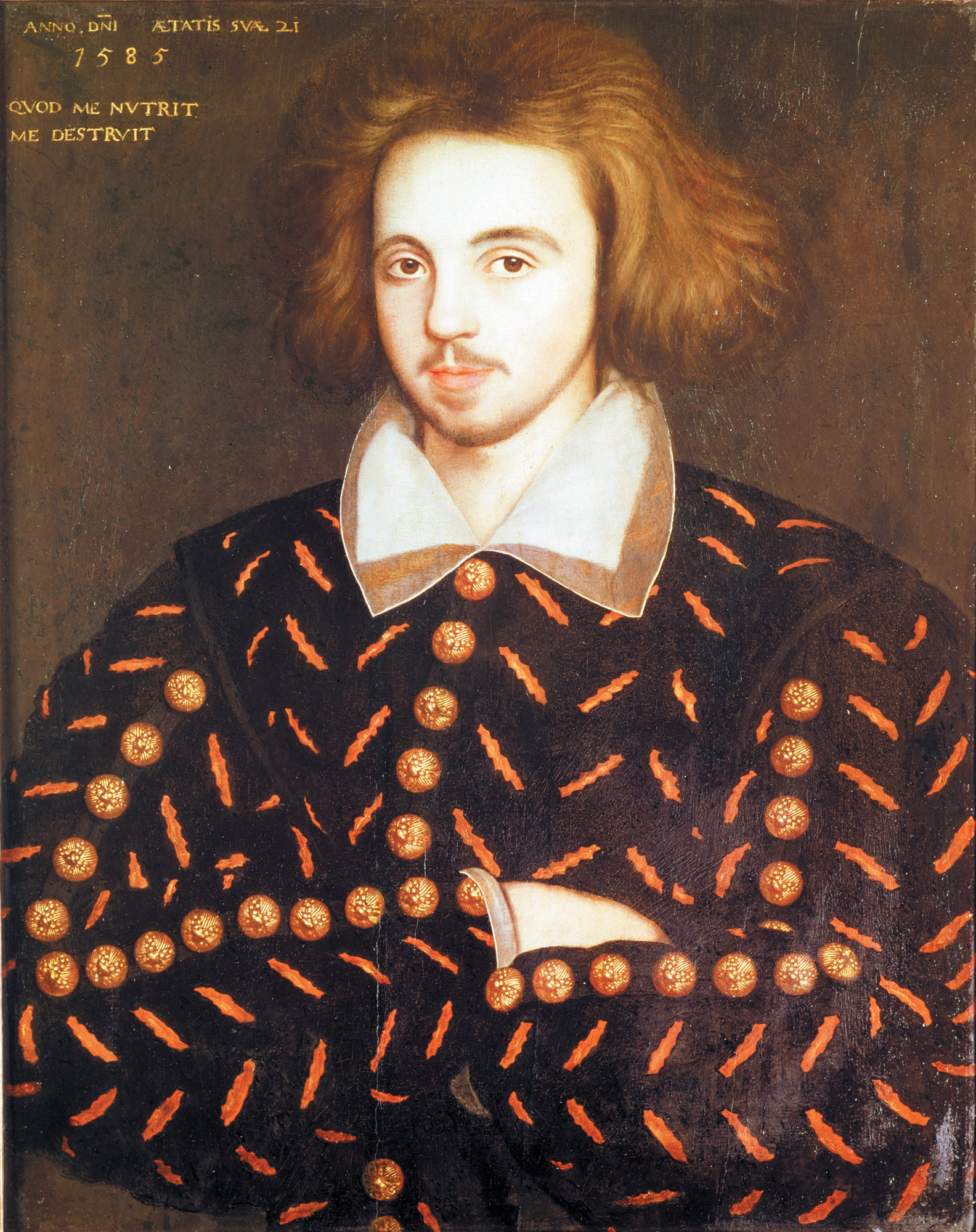
Portrait traditionally identified as Christopher Marlowe (Corpus Christi College, Cambridge)

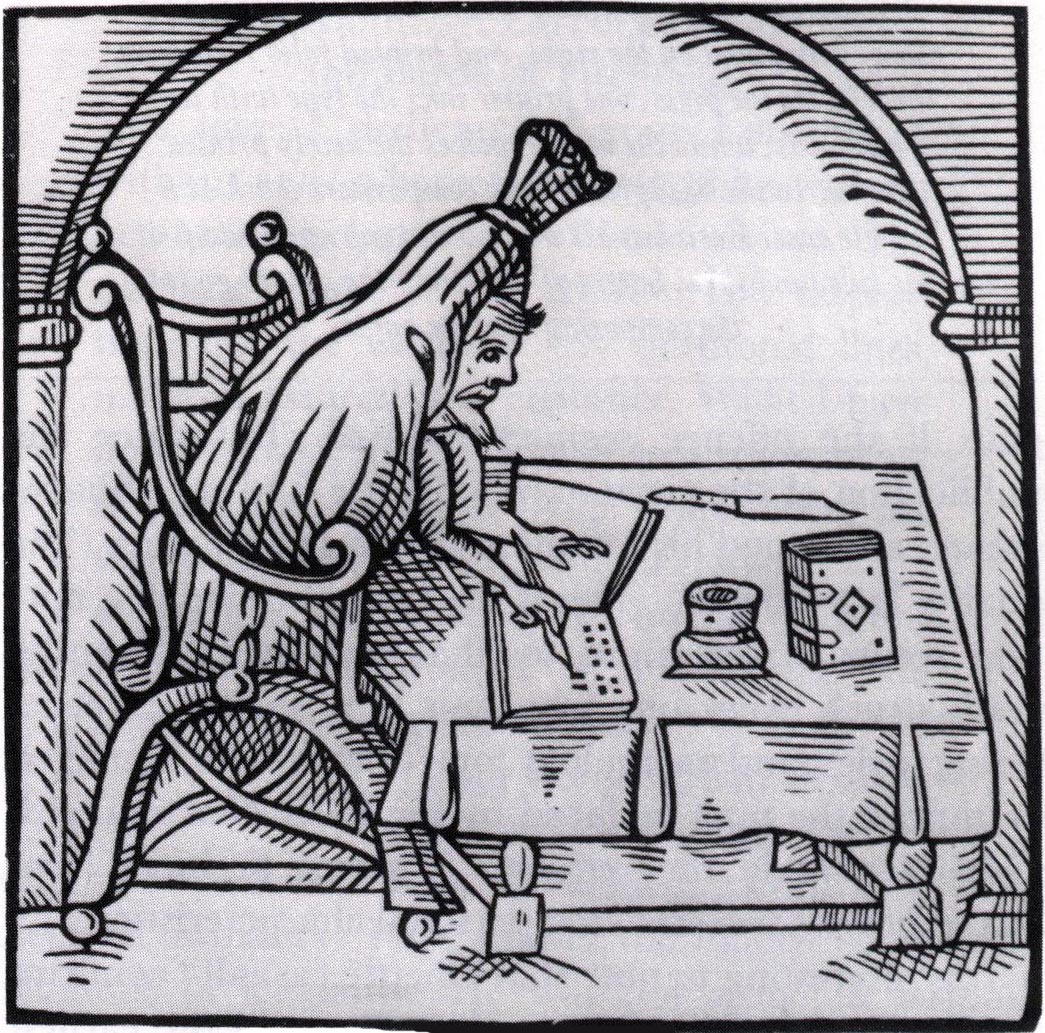
Satirical print from the pamphlet Greene in Conceit (1598) depicting the deceased Robert Greene (wearing a winding sheet) still writing from beyond the grave.

The University Wits is a phrase used to name a group of late 16th-century English playwrights and pamphleteers who were educated at the universities (Oxford or Cambridge) and who became popular secular writers. Prominent members of this group were Christopher Marlowe, Robert Greene, and Thomas Nashe from Cambridge, and John Lyly, Thomas Lodge, and George Peele from Oxford. Thomas Kyd is also sometimes included in the group, though he was not from either Oxford or Cambridge.

This diverse and talented loose association of London writers and dramatists set the stage for the theatrical Renaissance of Elizabethan England. They are identified as among the earliest professional writers in English, and prepared the way for the writings of William Shakespeare, who was born just two months after Marlowe.

The University Wits, on leaving their universities faced the Elizabethan problem discussed by Francis Bacon in his essay, "Of Seditions and Troubles" — schools were producing more scholars than there were opportunities. The University Wits found employment in theatre, not their first choice, but there was little else for them. Their great educations discouraged taking up the humble trades of their fathers — it’s hard to picture the brilliantly educated Marlowe mending shoes. The fear and bitter anxiety caused by this plight for ambitious graduates is the basis for the three Parnassus plays, which were written by Cambridge students in their last year. This is the sting that explains the bitterly competitive feelings between University Wits, and wits who did not attend university.

== Term ==
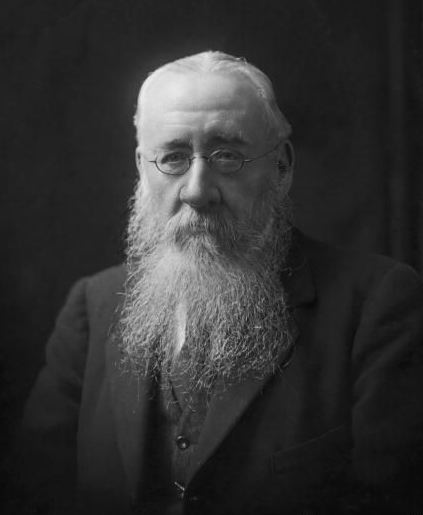
George Saintsbury, who coined the term "university wits"

The term "University Wits" was not used in their lifetime, but was coined by George Saintsbury, a 19th-century journalist and author. Saintsbury argues that the "rising sap" of dramatic creativity in the 1580s showed itself in two separate "branches of the national tree":

In the first place, we have the group of University Wits, the strenuous if not always wise band of professed men of letters, at the head of whom are Lyly, Marlowe, Greene, Peele, Lodge, Nash, and probably (for his connection with the universities is not certainly known) Kyd. In the second, we have the irregular band of outsiders, players and others, who felt themselves forced into literary and principally dramatic composition, who boast Shakespeare as their chief, and who can claim as seconds to him not merely the imperfect talents of Chettle, Munday, and others whom we may mention in this chapter, but many of the perfected ornaments of a later time.

Saintsbury argues that the Wits drew on the ploddingly academic verse-drama of Thomas Sackville, and the crude but lively popular entertainments of "miscellaneous farce-and-interlude-writers", to create the first truly powerful dramas in English. The University Wits, "with Marlowe at their head, made the blank verse line for dramatic purposes, dismissed, cultivated as they were, the cultivation of classical models, and gave English tragedy its Magna Charta of freedom and submission to the restrictions of actual life only". However, they failed "to achieve perfect life-likeness". It was left to "the actor-playwrights who, rising from very humble beginnings, but possessing in their fellow Shakespeare a champion unparalleled in ancient and modern times, borrowed the improvements of the university wits, added their own stage knowledge, and with Shakespeare's aid achieved the master drama of the world."

The term "University Wits" was taken up by many writers in the 20th century to refer to the group of authors listed by Saintsbury, often using his basic model of dramatic development. Adolphus William Ward in The Cambridge History of English Literature (1932) has a chapter on "The Plays of the University Wits", in which he argues that a "pride in university training which amounted to arrogance" was combined with "really valuable ideas and literary methods". In 1931, Allardyce Nicoll wrote that "it was left to the so-called University Wits to make the classical tragedy popular and the popular tragedy unified in construction and conscious of its aim."

== Characteristics ==
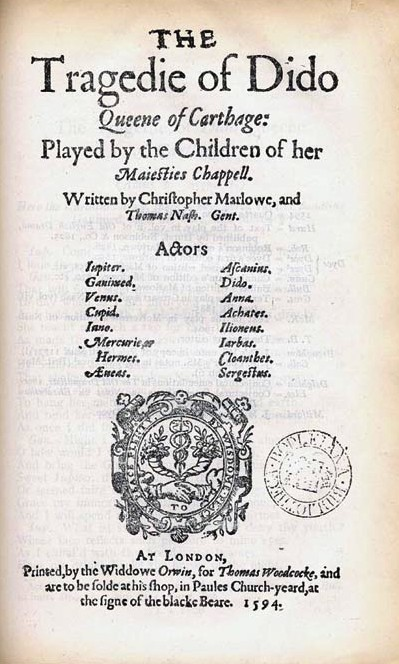
title page of Dido, Queen of Carthage, co-written by Marlowe and Nashe

Edward Albert in his History of English Literature (1923) states that the plays of the University Wits "had several features in common": Heroic, and usually tragic themes, which were given "heroic treatment" in a heroic style.

G. K. Hunter argues that the new "Humanistic education" of the age allowed them to create a "complex commercial drama, drawing on the nationalisation of religious sentiment" in such a way that it spoke to an audience "caught in the contradictions and liberations history had imposed".

While Marlowe is the most famous dramatist among them, Greene and Nashe were better known for their controversial, risqué and argumentative pamphlets, creating an early form of journalism. Greene has been called the "first notorious professional writer".

== Supposed disputes ==
An apparent attack on Shakespeare as an "upstart crow" in the pamphlet Greene's Groats-Worth of Wit, published as the work of the recently deceased Robert Greene, has led to the view that the two "branches" Saintsbury describes were in conflict, and that the University Wits resented the rise of the "actor-playwrights", as Shakespeare did not have the elite education the Wits did. However, many scholars believe that the pamphlet was in fact written by Henry Chettle, a writer listed by Saintsbury as one of the "irregular band of outsiders" supposedly resented by the Wits. In the pamphlet "Greene" tells fellow-writers — generally assumed to be Peele, Marlowe and Nashe — to watch out for an upstart who is "beautified with our feathers".

Jenny Sager argues that "From its conception the term 'University Wits' has provided generations of critics with a sounding board from which to articulate their attitudes towards modern academia". Jeffrey Knapp argues that some authors have imagined an "all out war" between authors and actors, initiated by the Wits. Knapp criticises Richard Helgerson for claiming that a form of popular theatre was replaced by an elitist "author's theatre" because of the work of the Wits, arguing that praise for actors and willingness to collaborate are more typical of their careers.
