= Cutting Ball =

English criminal

"Cutting" Ball was a notorious criminal during the Elizabethan Age. (His name came from a "cutpurse", a thief.)

Thomas Nashe mentions a ballad written about him, which does not survive. His sister, Em, or Emma, was a prostitute, "a sorry ragged quean", who according to various reports was the mistress of the clown Richard Tarlton and later of the writer Robert Greene and cared for both on their death-beds. She is said to have had a son, Fortunatus (d. 1593), by Greene. Greene, who wrote much about the London underworld, once hired Ball as a bodyguard. Ball was hanged at Tyburn. The San Francisco experimental Cutting Ball Theatre was named after him.
