= Friar Bacon and Friar Bungay =

Play written by Robert Greene

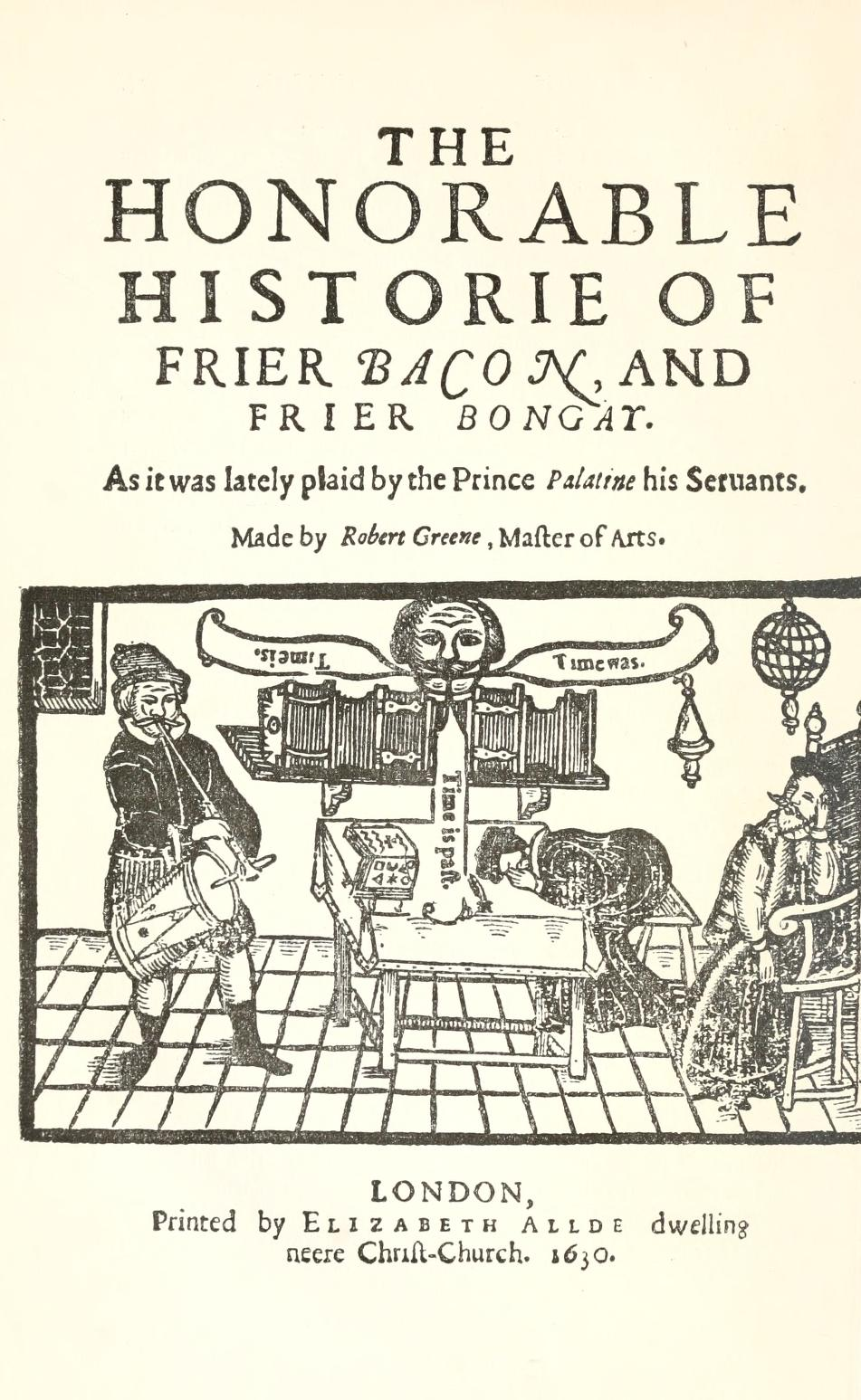
Title page of the 1630 printing of Friar Bacon and Friar Bungay. The engraving shows the magical talking brazen head at top.

Friar Bacon and Friar Bungay, originally entitled The Honorable Historie of Frier Bacon and Frier Bongay, is an Elizabethan era stage play, a comedy written by Robert Greene. Widely regarded as Greene's best and most significant play, it has received more critical attention than any other of Greene's dramas.

== History ==
The date of authorship of Friar Bacon and Friar Bungay cannot be fixed with certainty on the basis of the available evidence; the play is normally dated to the 1588–92 period. 1589 may be the single most likely year: a line in the play's opening scene, "Next Friday is S. James", fixes St. James's Day (25 July, the feast day of St. James the Great) as a Friday, which was true in 1589. Some critics argue that the magic in Greene's play was inspired by the magic in Marlowe's Doctor Faustus, (c. 1589–92) which if valid would mean that Bacon and Bungay must post-date Faustus; Greene's play also has relationships with several other plays of its era, most notably Fair Em (c. 1590). Yet since none of the plays in question can be dated with absolute certainty, the nature of the relationships among them are open to question and cannot resolve the pertinent dating issues.

The title page of the play's first edition states that Bacon and Bungay was acted by Queen Elizabeth's Men, as were several of Greene's other plays. Lord Strange's Men performed the play on 19 February 1592 at the Rose Theatre; it was acted again by a combination of the Queen's Men and Sussex's Men on 1 April 1594. The play then passed into the repertory of the Admiral's Men; that company paid Thomas Middleton to write a Prologue and Epilogue for a Court performance in 1602.

Bacon and Bungay was entered into the Stationers' Register on 14 May 1594, and was published later that year in quarto by the bookseller Edward White. The title page assigns the play to Greene. A second quarto was issued in 1630 by Elizabeth Allde; the Q2 title page states that the play was "lately played by the Prince Palatine his Servants" – the Admiral's Men in a later incarnation. A third quarto followed in 1655 from Jean Bell. Contemporary allusions indicate that the play was even more popular than its limited publication history indicates; references to the play are common in the literature of the era.

== Sources ==
Greene's primary source for his play was an anonymous sixteenth-century prose romance titled The Famous History of Friar Bacon (c. 1555?). The earliest extant printed edition of this work dates from 1627, long after both FBFB and Greene's 1592 death; manuscript versions, and perhaps one or more earlier printed editions, underlie the 1627 text. The relationship between FBFB and other plays of its era, some of which may have served as sources, has been noted above. FBFB also has a complex set of commonalities with the earlier Medieval drama of the morality play.

The "Friar Bacon" of the title is Roger Bacon (1219/20 – c. 1292), the thirteenth-century polymath who later enjoyed a popular reputation as a magician. The second friar was Bacon's late contemporary Thomas Bungay (c. 1214 – c. 1294). Bungay was a fellow Franciscan who wrote a commentary on Aristotle's De Caelo and served as the Franciscans' Minister Provincial over England during the mid-1270s.

In addition to Roger Bacon, the tale of the brazen head was connected with several other prominent figures of the later Middle Ages, including Robert Grosseteste and Gerbert of Aurillac. In one account, Albertus Magnus formed the brazen head, only to have it broken by Thomas Aquinas.

== Plot ==
Friar Bacon and Friar Bungay is recognised as a groundbreaking play in terms of multiple-plot structure; different scholars have identified three plots, or two, or four.

Prince Edward, the son and heir of King Henry III, plans to seduce Margaret, the Fair Maid of Fressingfield, with the help of the necromancer Friar Bacon. Edward also employs a more conventional approach, relying on the eloquence of his friend Earl Lacy to help with the seduction. Lacy goes to persuade Margaret, but quickly falls in love with her himself. When Edward learns of the love of Lacy and Margaret, he threatens to kill his friend – before he masters his passion and reconciles himself to the fact. Edward returns to court, where he falls in love with and marries Elinor of Castile, the bride his father has chosen for him.

The beautiful Margaret is the unwilling cause of a quarrel between two of her neighbours, the Suffolk squires Serlesby and Lambert: they both fancy themselves in love with her, and kill each other in a duel. Margaret receives a letter from the absent Lacy, renouncing his love for her. She decides to enter a nunnery, but Lacy intercepts her before she takes her vows, and tells her that he was only testing her constancy. After an understandable hesitation, Margaret accepts Lacy's conduct and his explanation; they are married – together with Edward and Elinor – at the end of the play.

Another level of plot involves Friar Bacon and his magic. Bacon displays a range of magical skills: he shows Edward the romance of Lacy and Margaret in his magic glass, and interrupts their wedding at a distance; he magically transports a tavern hostess from one place to another; he wins a contest of magic with a German named Vandermast, witnessed by the Kings of England and Castile and by the Emperor of Germany. In collaboration with another magician, Friar Bungay, Bacon labours toward his greatest achievement: the creation of a talking artificial head made of brass, animated by demonic influence, that can surround England with a protective wall of the same metal. Yet Bacon's inability to remain awake and the incompetence of his servant Miles spoil the opportunity. (The brazen head speaks three times, saying "Time is", "Time was", and "Time is past", then falls to the floor and shatters. Miles does not have the wit to wake his master in time.) Finally, Bacon inadvertently allows two young Oxonians to witness their fathers' duel in the magic glass; in response the students themselves duel, and kill each other. Appalled by this outcome, Bacon renounces magic and turns to a life of repentance. His bad servant Miles, haunted by Bacon's conjured devils, gets a promise of a tapster's job in Hell from one of them, and rides to perdition on the devil's back.

== Sequel ==
The anonymous manuscript play John of Bordeaux, or The Second Part of Friar Bacon is a sequel to FBFB, written to build upon the success of the original play. The John of Bordeaux MS., annotated by prompters, mentions the name of John Holland, an actor who was with Lord Strange's Men in the early 1590s. This has suggested to some researchers that the Friar Bacon play acted by Strange's Men on 19 February 1592 was this second part of the story rather than the original FBFB.

== Modern performances ==
The story was redone for children in 1905 as "Roger Bacon and the Brazen Head" for James Baldwin's Thirty More Famous Stories Retold. In 2013, television actor David Oakes directed the play at Shakespeare's Globe as part of their Read Not Dead season.

== Editions ==
- The Honorable Historie of frier Bacon, and frier Bongay, London: Edward White, 1594, reproduced in facsimile 1914 by The Tudor Facsimile Texts.
- The Honorable Historie of Frier Bacon, and Frier Bongay, London: Elizabeth Allde, 1630.
- The Honorable History of Frier Bacon and Frier Bungay, London: Jean Bell, 1655.
- Gayley, Charles Mills, ed. (1903), "Edition of the Honourable Historie of Frier Bacon", Representative English Comedies: From the Beginnings to Shakespeare, New York: reprinted 1916 by Norwood Press for the Macmillan Co., pp. 433–502.
- Guild, T.E.; et al., eds. (1905), Frier Bacon and Frier Bungay, Urbana: The English Club, an abridgment of Prof. Gayley's edition.
- Harrison, G.B., ed. (1927), The Honourable History of Friar Bacon and Friar Bungay, The Fortune Play Books, London: Westminster Press for Robert Holden & Co..

The supposed 1599 edition, sometimes encountered, is simply a mistaken copy of Mrs. Allde's 1630 edition.
