= A Looking Glass for London =

A Looking Glass for London and England is an Elizabethan era stage play, a collaboration between Thomas Lodge and Robert Greene. Recounting the Biblical story of Jonah and the fall of Nineveh, the play is a noteworthy example of the survival of the Medieval morality play style of drama in the period of English Renaissance theatre.

== Date ==
The play dates from late 1589 or early 1590.

== Performance ==
The premier production of A Looking Glass may have been staged by Queen Elizabeth's Men, the company that acted many of Greene's plays; the play's Clown may have been portrayed by Queen's Man John Adams. The play is known to have been acted by Lord Strange's Men on 8 March, 1592, and remained in the dramatic repertory for many years. It may have been acted at Nördlingen in Germany in 1605.

The play was produced by Violet Mirage Theatre Company and Directed by Che Flory and Casey Hennessy in the 2025 Kansas City Fringe Festival, July 18-26, 2025. The principal roles were portrayed by:

Asher Alcantara, King Rasni;

Cory Drozdowski, Radagon;

Che Flory, Paphlagonia;

Jasmine Hawkins, Jonah;

Casey Hennessy, Alvida

== Publication ==
A Looking Glass was entered into the Stationers' Register on 5 March 1594 by the printer Thomas Creede, and was published later that year in a quarto printed by Creede and sold by the stationer William Barley. This was one of the notable instances in which Creede the printer acted as a publisher who then farmed out his work to a bookseller – a reversal of the usual relationship in Elizabethan publishing. Creede issued a second quarto in 1598, which was also sold by Barley; a third quarto followed in 1602, printed by Creede and sold by Thomas Pavier. A fourth quarto appeared in 1617 from Bernard Alsop, who took over Creede's business in that year.

One extant quarto of A Looking Glass possesses markings and notes that equipped the text for service as a prompt book for an early production. The quarto shows the text was updated for the 1603 accession of King James I, altered to reflect changes in English law, and adapted to the London audience; but except for the addition of a missing line, the text was not corrected for the errors and corruptions that are so common in the dramatic texts of the period. Use of a printed text as a prompt book is rare but not unprecedented in the era; such a text may have provided the copy for the First Folio text of A Midsummer Night's Dream.

== Authorship ==
Both the 1594 Stationers' Register entry and the title page of the first edition attribute the play to Lodge and Greene. Some individual scholars have tried to assign shares of the play to the two different collaborators, though no consensus judgement has been reached. The Biblical portions of the play depend directly and heavily on the text of the Bishops' Bible; some critics have judged this dependency to be suggestive of Lodge more than Greene.

== Synopsis ==
The opening scene shows King Rasni of Nineveh just after his victory over Jeroboam, the "king of Jerusalem". Monstrously vain and arrogant, Rasni relishes the sycophantic praise of his courtiers and tributary kings; he proclaims that "Rasni is god on earth, and none but he". The only dissenting voice comes from the King of Crete, who protests against Rasni's planned incestuous marriage with his sister Remilia. The protest is fruitless: Rasni deprives the Cretan king of his crown, bestowing it upon the upstart flatterer Radagon. The prophet Oseas is lowered over the stage by an angel; seated on a throne, Oseas functions as observer and chorus, commenting upon the play's action and applying its lessons to contemporary English life.

Subsequent scenes in the main plot alternate between the court of Rasni and Remilia, and scenes showing an usurer and his victims – primarily the spendthrift young gentleman Thrasybulus and the virtuous but poor Alcon, both of whom have loans forfeited to an unscrupulous moneylender. The two men try to obtain justice from the law courts, but find that the law is corrupt – the judge is a pawn of the usurer.

(The serious scenes of the main plot are interspersed with comic subplot scenes, devoted to showing common people in the common sins of drunkenness, gluttony and disorder.)

Rasni and Remilia prepare a sumptuous wedding before their court – which is prevented when a thunderstorm rises and Remilia is killed by a bolt of lightning. Rasni rejects the implication of divine wrath; in place of his sister, he takes Alvida, the wife of the king of Paphlagonia, as his lover. Alvida poisons her husband, a deed that Rasni praises. Jonah enters in the third act, as the play portrays his flight to Tarsus and Joppa to avoid the divinely-ordered mission to warn Nineveh of its sinful ways. Jonah's actual swallowing by the whale is not depicted directly, but the fourth act opens with him being "cast out of the whale's belly upon the stage" (which must have made a striking special effect). Jonah then accepts his divine mission and heads toward Nineveh.

Having failed to obtain justice in the courts, Alcon appeals to his son, who is none other than Radagon, the fast-rising courtier. But Radagon is contemptuously dismissive of his poor family, now that he has ascended to wealth and power. Alcon's wife curses Radagon – and immediately he is consumed by "a flame of fire". Rasni's magi define this as a purely natural phenomenon, once again ignoring the portents of divine retribution; they pass off a sign in the heavens (a hand brandishing a flaming sword) the same way. Alvida attempts to seduce the King of Cilicia, another of Rasni's clients; she faints when Rasni catches her.

By Act V, Alcon and his family are reduced to thievery to survive. Jonah arrives at Nineveh, preaching repentance; his preaching is so powerful that even the most corrupt are affected. Sinners who fast and repent – even Rasni and Alvida – are forgiven. Jonah ends the play alone on the stage, applying the moral lessons of the play to the lives of Londoners and Englishmen.
