= A Knack to Know a Knave =

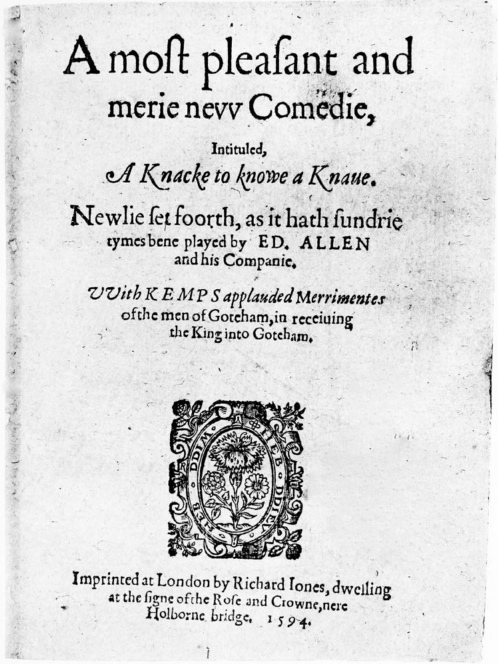
The title page of a Knack to Know a Knave in its 1594 quarto

A Knack to Know a Knave is a 1592 play closely associated with the principal performers Edward Alleyn and William Kempe. The play is a comic morality tale designed to highlight the talents of the celebrated clown Kempe, and is known from one text. The author is unknown, though the involvement of Robert Greene has been suggested, as well as George Peele and Thomas Nashe. Recent scholarship has argued for a Shakespearean connection. On the basis of traditional literary-critical analysis and digital textual methods, Darren Freebury-Jones has proposed that the case for Robert Wilson's authorship of A Knack to Know a Knave is compelling. The play gives an insight into the nature of Elizabethan theatre during Shakespeare's time and the relationship between playscript and extemporised comedy.

== Performance and publication ==
A Knack to Know a Knave first appears in the diary of theatre impresario Philip Henslowe, listing the play as performed by the Lord Strange's Men at the Rose Playhouse on 10 June 1592. The manuscript diary shows that the play took that day £3 and 12s, a substantial amount, which indicates the piece was a success with theatregoers. The diary shows that the play went on to be performed several times at the Rose in 1592 and 1593.

The title page of its published form describes it as "a most pleasant and merry new comedy", and highlights the inclusion of "Kemp's applauded Merrimentes of the Men of Gotham", who are introduced by the stage direction "Enter mad men of Goteham, to wit, a Miller, a Cobler and a Smith" followed by dialogue." The lack of stage directions, and the relative shortness of the play compared to other contemporary playtexts also indicate that the 1594 quarto may not be a finished performance text.

The highly allusive text makes reference to the work of many contemporary dramatists, such as Greene, Marlowe, Lodge and Peele. There are verbal similarities between the text of Knave and that of The Taming of the Shrew, one of Shakespeare's earliest plays, which help to date the slightly later Shrew. There are also remarks in Greene's Groatsworth of Wit, his 1592 pamphlet satirising his fellow playwrights, which have been argued provide evidence of Greene's annoyance that the up-and-coming Shakespeare had re-written some of the Knack to Know a Knave text; however, this remains controversial.

== Summary ==
The play tells the story of the four sons of the mortally ill bailiff of Hexham living in 10th century England. On his deathbed the Bailiff advises his sons "Live to yourselves while you have time to live / Get what you can, but see you nothing give." Each of the sons pursues knavery in his own way, but Honesty in the end both exposes their stratagems and inflicts a series of painful punishments.

A parallel storyline concerns the King of Saxon England, Edgar, who desires Alfrida, the daughter of Osrick, and sends Ethenwald the Earl of Cornwall, to woo the beauty for him. Here the storytelling emphasises that the King is not without fault: "sins, like swarms, remain in thee".

Much of the comedy of the piece was likely provided in extemporised passages by Kempe of which we now have no record. The title page highlights the appearance of the Men of Gotham, a village in Nottinghamshire that had become a Tudor folk byword for cunning tax avoidance, after a 1540 chapbook appeared, recounting how their feigned idiocy successfully deterred a royal visit expected to entail high local expenditure.
