= Steve Mentz =

American academic and "blue humanist"

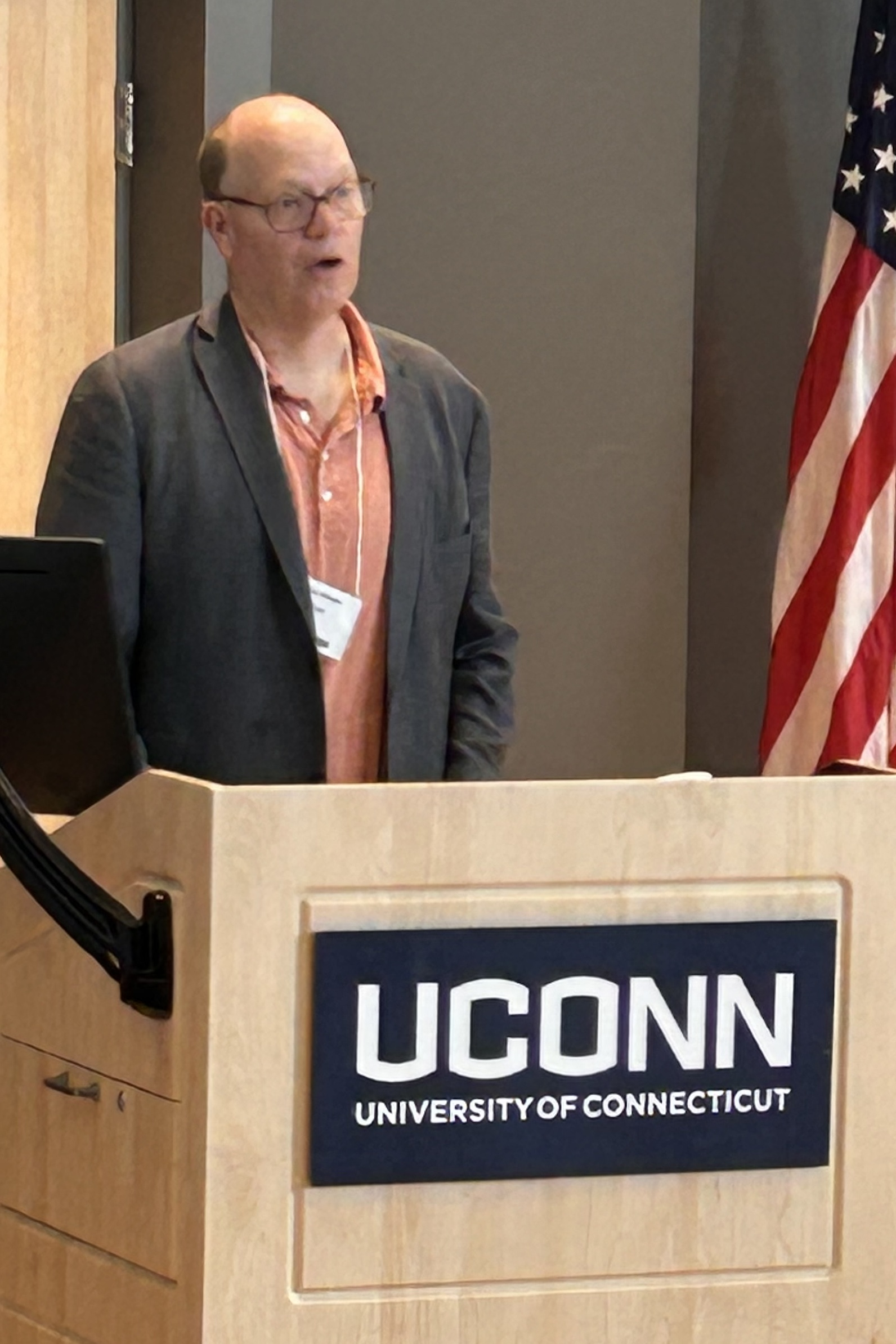

Academic background
- Education: Yale University (PhD, MA, MPhil); Princeton University (BA)
- Thesis: Romance for Sale: Genre and the Book Market in Elizabethan Prose Fiction (2000)
- Doctoral advisor: Annabel Patterson

Academic work
- Discipline: Early Modern English
- Sub-discipline: Ecocriticism
- Institutions: St. John's University
- Notable ideas: Blue humanities

Steven Roger Mentz is a professor of English at St. John's University. An early-modernist, Mentz's career began with a focus on Shakespeare before branching out into the literature of the Atlantic World and environmental studies. He has received fellowships from the National Endowment for the Humanities and Frank C. Munson Institute of American Maritime Studies, the Folger Shakespeare Library, and the John Carter Brown Library. He received his PhD from Yale University and his BA from Princeton University. His work focuses on the ocean and the Anthropocene from a humanistic perspective.

Mentz is most famous for developing the "blue humanities," an approach to environmental studies and ecocriticism that challenges the terrestrial bias that previously dominated the discipline.

== Bibliography ==
- Romance for Sale in Early Modern England (2006)
- At the Bottom of Shakespeare's Ocean (2009)
- Shipwreck Modernity: Ecologies of Globalization, 1550–1719 (2015)
- Break Up the Anthropocene (2019)
- Ocean (2020)
- An Introduction to the Blue Humanities (2023)
- Sailing without Ahab: Eco-poetic Travels (2024)
