= Coney-catching =

Elizabethan slang for theft through trickery

Coney-catching is Elizabethan slang for theft through trickery. It comes from the word "coney" (sometimes spelled conny), meaning a rabbit raised for the table and thus tame.

A coney-catcher was a thief or con man.

It was a practice in medieval and Renaissance England in which devious people on the street would try to con or cheat vulnerable or gullible pedestrians. The term appears in The Taming of the Shrew and The Merry Wives of Windsor by William Shakespeare, and in the John Florio translation of Montaigne's essay, "Of the Cannibals."

The term was first used in print by Robert Greene in a series of 1592 pamphlets, the titles of which included "The Defence of Conny-catching," in which he argued there were worse crimes to be found among "reputable" people, and "A Disputation betweene a Hee Conny-catcher and a Shee Conny-catcher."
