= William Gager =

16th/17th-century English playwright

William Gager (1555–1622) was an English jurist, now known for his Latin dramas. William Gager was the son of Gilbert Gager and Thomasina Cordell Gager. He was educated at Westminster School and Christ Church, Oxford.

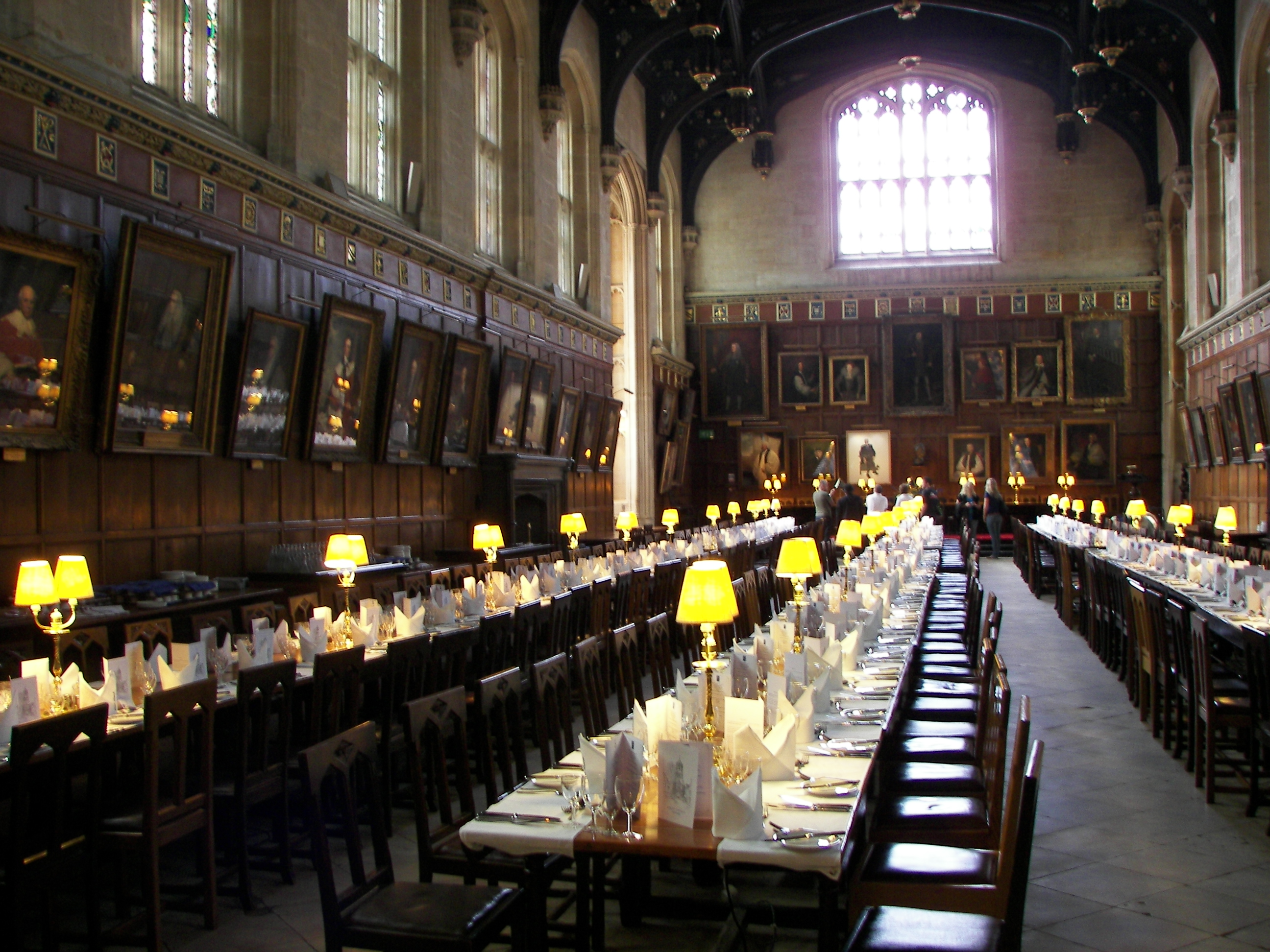
Christ Church dining hall, where Gager's plays were performed.

His works were produced at the University of Oxford, from 1582 to 1592. He was considered one of the major dramatists of the late sixteenth century. Apart from one comedy, Rivales (1582), which has not survived, his works were all Latin tragedies. They include Oedipus (1582), Meleager (1582), Dido (1583) and Ulysses Redux (1592). He stayed closer to the model of Senecan tragedy than other contemporaries, and adapted Seneca's Hippolytus in 1592, with the addition of scenes. He was also a Neo-Latin poet.

Gager is mentioned alongside Shakespeare in Francis Meres' Palladis Tamia or Wits Treasury in the section 'A Comparative discourse of our English poets, with the Greeks, Latine and Italian Poets': "The best Poets for Comedy among the Greeks are these, Menander, Aristophanes, Eupolis Atheniensis, Alexis Terius, Nicostratus, Amipsias Atheniensis, Anaxedrides, Rhodius, Aristonymus, Archippus Atheniensis and Callias Atheniensis; and among the Latines, Plautus, Terence, Naeuius, Sext. Turpilius, Licinius Imbrex, and Virgilius Romanus: so the best for Comedy amongst us bee, Edward Earle of Oxforde, Doctor Gager of Oxforde, Maister Rowley once a rare Scholler of learned Pembrooke Hall in Cambridge, Maister Edwardes one of her Majesties Chappell, eloquent and wittie John Lilly, Lodge, Gascoyne, Greene, Shakespeare, Thomas Nash, Thomas Heywood, Anthony Mundye our best plotter, Chapman, Porter, Wilson, Hathway, and Henry Chettle."
