= Thomas Lodge =

English writer and dramatist (1557–1625)

- Born: c. 1557; West Ham, East London, England
- Died: September 1625 (aged 66–67); Old Fish Street, City of London, England
- Spouses: Joan (m. 1583); Jane Aldred
- Issue: Mary
- Father: Sir Thomas Lodge
- Mother: Anne Luddington

Thomas Lodge (c. 1557 – September 1625) was an English writer and medical practitioner whose life spanned the Elizabethan and Jacobean periods.

== Biography ==
=== Early life ===
Thomas Lodge was born about 1557 in West Ham, the second son of Sir Thomas Lodge, Lord Mayor of London, by his third wife Anne (1528–1579), daughter of Henry Luddington (died 1531), a London grocer. (Note: Anne Luddington (1528–1579), widow of the London grocer, William Lane (by whom she had four children, Luke, Gabriel, Anne and Elizabeth), and daughter of the London grocer, Henry Luddington (died 1531), by Joan Kirkeby (died 1576), daughter and heir of William Kirkeby (died 1531) of London. After the death of Henry Luddington in 1531, his widow, Joan, married Sir William Laxton, Lord Mayor of London and one of the wealthiest merchants of his day. There were no issue of Laxton's marriage, and his will stipulated that after the death of his widow, Joan, (Note: Joan Laxton was buried 15 August 1576.) his estate would go to his niece Joan Wanton, who was his right heir, and to his three step-children by Joan's first marriage, Nicholas Luddington, Joan Luddington, and Sir Thomas Lodge's third wife, Anne Luddington.) (Note: Lodge had five brothers and two sisters of the whole blood: William Lodge, eldest son and heir, aged 30 on 8 July 1584, who on 14 October 1577 married Mary Blagrave, the daughter of Thomas Blagrave, Master of the Revels.; Thomas Lodge (baptized 23 May 1556, buried 4 June 1556), second son.; Nicholas Lodge (born before 1562), who became a ward of his brother-in-law, Gamaliel Woodford.; Benedict Lodge (baptized 18 April 1563), who became a ward of Richard Culverwell.; Henry Lodge baptized 14 April 1566 at St Peter's Cornhill, who became a ward of Thomas Waterhouse.; Joan Lodge (born 1555), who was the god-daughter of Anthony Hussey, and married, on 30 March 1573, Gamaliel Woodford, grocer and Merchant of the Staple, by whom she had a son, Thomas Woodford (born 13 January 1578), who held the lease of the Whitefriars Theatre with Michael Drayton.; Anne Lodge (born 1558-1562, buried 19 December 1573).; Lodge's half-sister, Sara, married the printer Edward White.)

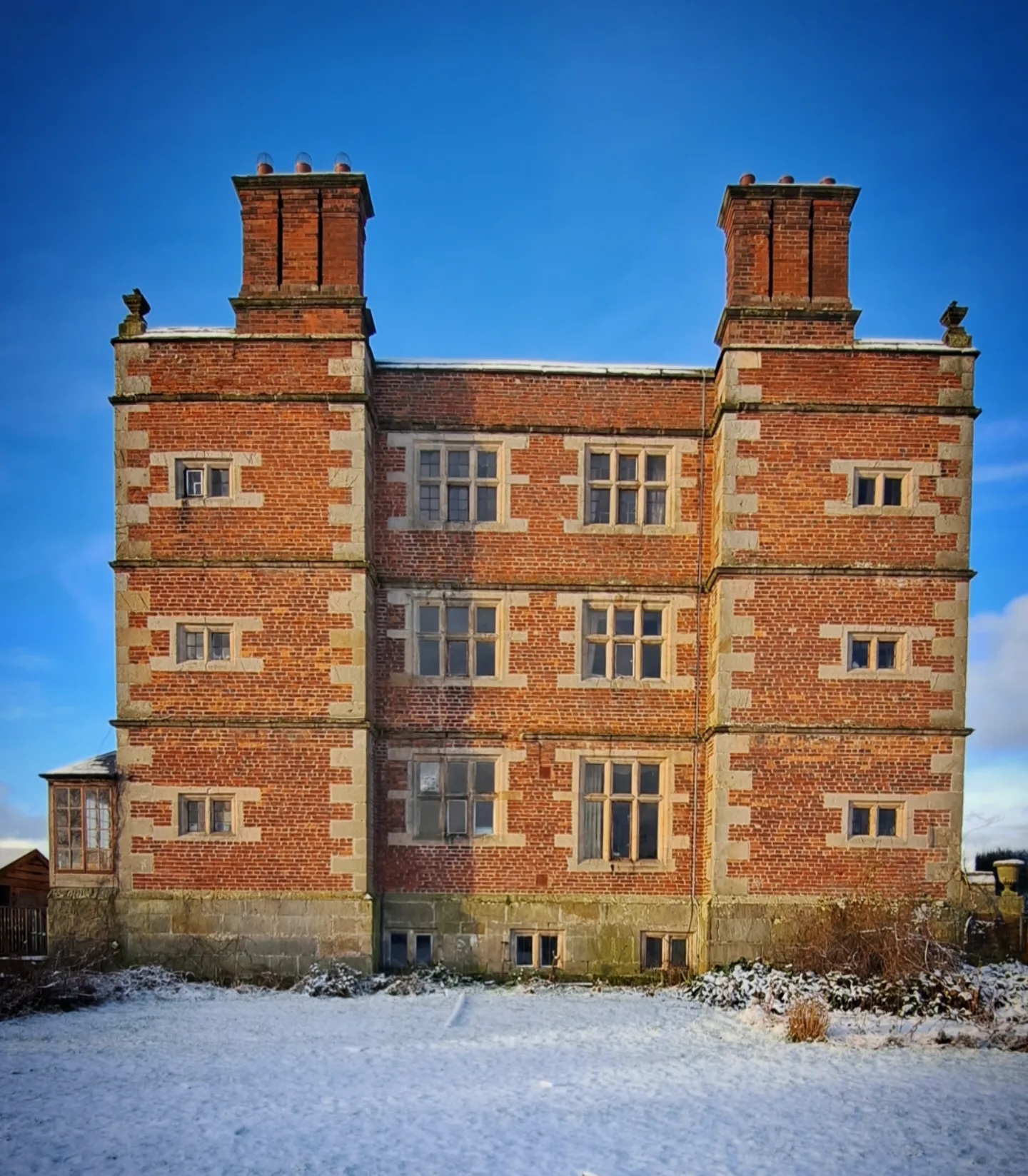
View of Soulton Hall, a manor on the edge of the Forest of Arden the Lodge family were associated with and lived at before transferring the freehold to 'Old' Sir Rowland Hill

The year before he was born his father had transferred the ownership the manors of Hawkstone and Soulton to Sir Rowland Hill, publisher of the Geneva Bible and a fellow Lord Mayor. The Lodge family continued some form of association with those manors, and it has been suggested that this was part of the inspiration of Lodge junior's literary output.

He was educated at Merchant Taylors' School and Trinity College, Oxford; taking his BA in 1577 and MA in 1581. In 1578 he entered Lincoln's Inn, where, as in the other Inns of Court, a love of letters and a crop of debts were common.

=== Early literary work ===
Lodge, disregarding the wishes of his family, took up literature. When the penitent Stephen Gosson had published his Schoole of Abuse in 1579, Lodge responded with Defence of Poetry, Music and Stage Plays (1579 or 1580), which shows a certain restraint, though both forceful and learned. The pamphlet was banned, but appears to have been circulated privately. It was answered by Gosson in his Playes Confuted in Five Actions; and Lodge retorted with his Alarum Against Usurers (1584)—a "tract for the times" which may have resulted from personal experience. In the same year he produced the first tale written by him on his own account in prose and verse, The Delectable History of Forbonius and Prisceria, both published and reprinted with the Alarum.

From 1587 onwards he seems to have made a series of attempts at play writing, though most of those attributed to him are mainly conjectural. He probably never became an actor, and John Payne Collier's conclusion to that effect rested on the two assumptions that the "Lodge" of Philip Henslowe's manuscript was a player and that his name was Thomas, neither of which is supported by the text.

Having been to sea with Captain Clarke in his expedition to Terceira and the Canaries, Lodge in 1591 made a voyage with Thomas Cavendish to Brazil and the Straits of Magellan, returning home by 1593.

=== Writing Shakespeare source material ===
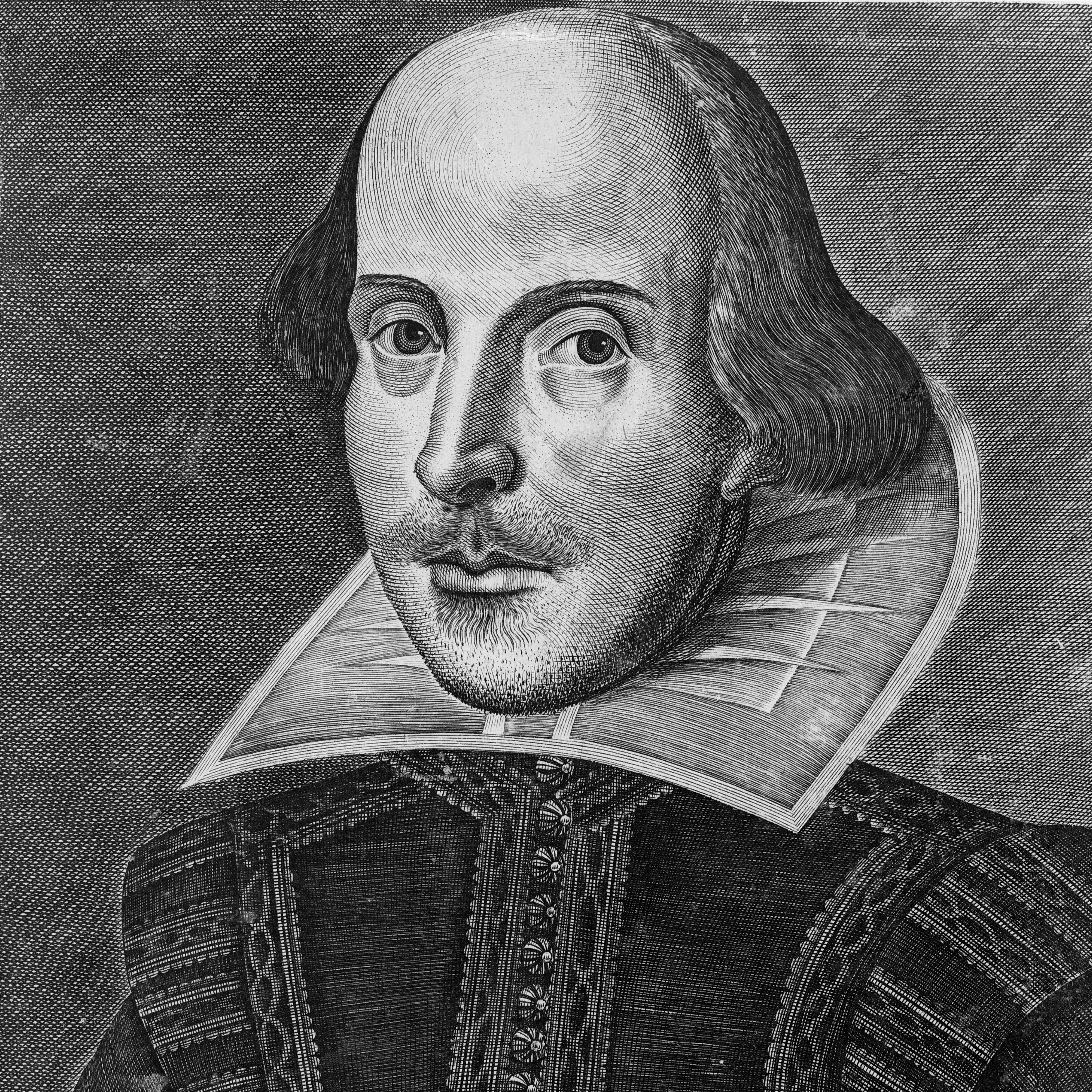
Shakespeare was inspired to write As You Like It by Lodge's work Rosalynde: Euphues Golden Legacy, Found After His Death In His Cell At Silexedra.

During the Canaries expedition (circa 1586), to beguile the tedium of his voyage, he composed his prose tale of Rosalynde. Euphues Golden Legacy, Found after His Death in His Cell At Silexedra. (1590). This subsequently furnished the story of Shakespeare's As You Like It.

The novel, which in its turn owes some, though no very considerable, debt to the medieval Tale of Gamelyn (unwarrantably appended to the fragmentary Cookes Tale in certain manuscripts of Geoffrey Chaucer's works), is written in the euphuistic manner, but decidedly attractive both by its plot and by the situations arising from it. It has been frequently reprinted.

The name Euphues is taken from a work by John Lyly, itself taken from Roger Ascham's The Scholemaster, which describes Euphues as a type of student who is:

apte by goodnes of witte, and appliable by readines of will, to learning, hauving all other qualities of the mind and partes of the bodie, that must an other day serue learning, not trobled, mangled, and halfed, but sounde, whole, full & hable to do their office

==== Later works and later life ====
Before starting on his second expedition he had published a historical romance, The History of Robert, Second Duke of Normandy, surnamed Robert the Devil; and he left behind him for publication Catharos Diogenes in his Singularity, a discourse on the immorality of Athens (London). Both appeared in 1591. Another romance in the manner of Lyly, Euphues Shadow, the Battaile of the Sences (1592), appeared while Lodge was still on his travels.

In the latter part of his life—possibly about 1596, when he published his Wits Miserie and the World's Madnesse, which is dated from Low Leyton in Essex, and the religious tract Prosopopeia (if, as seems probable, it was his), in which he repents him of his "lewd lines" of other days—he became a Catholic and engaged in the practice of medicine, for which Wood says he qualified himself by a degree at Avignon in 1600. Two years afterwards he received the degree of M.D. from Oxford University.

Early in 1606 he seems to have left England, to escape the persecution then directed against the Catholics; and a letter from him dated 1610 thanks the English ambassador in Paris for enabling him to return in safety. He was abroad on urgent private affairs of one kind and another in 1616. From this time to his death nothing further concerning him remains to be noted.

Lodge while practising medicine in London lived first in Warwick Lane, afterwards in Lambert Hill, and finally in Old Fish Street in the parish of St Mary Magdalen. He died in Old Fish Street in 1625, apparently in the Roman Catholic communion (see below). He may have been buried in St Mary Magdalen Old Fish Street, demolished in 1893, but documentary evidence is lacking.

== Dramatic works ==
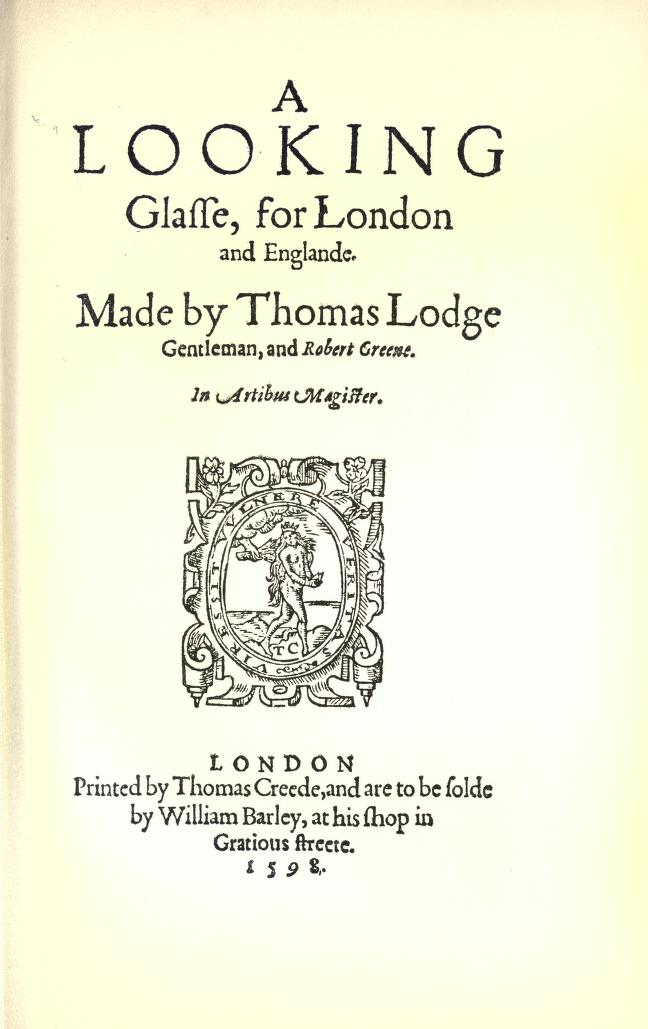
1598 edition of A Looking Glasse, for London and Englande

Lodge's known dramatic work is small in quantity. In conjunction with Robert Greene he, probably in 1590, produced in a popular vein the odd but far from feeble play, A Looking Glass for London and England (published 1594). He had already written The Wounds of Civil War (produced perhaps as early as 1587, and published in 1594), a good second-rate piece in the half-chronicle fashion of its age. Darren Freebury-Jones has advanced arguments that Lodge co-wrote Selimus with Greene.

Fleay saw grounds for assigning to Lodge Mucedorus and Amadine, played by the Queen's Men about 1588, a share with Robert Greene in George a Greene, the Pinner of Wakefield, and in Shakespeare's 2nd part of Henry VI; he also regards him as at least part-author of The True Chronicle of King Leir and his three Daughters (1594); and The Troublesome Raigne of John, King of England (c. 1588); in the case of two other plays he allowed the assignation to Lodge to be purely conjectural.

That Lodge is the "Young Juvenal" of Greene's Groats-Worth of Wit is no longer a generally accepted hypothesis.

== Poetry and prose ==
His second historical romance, the Life and Death of William Longbeard (1593), was more successful than the first. Lodge also brought back with him from the new world A Margarite of America (published 1596), a romance of the same description interspersed with many lyrics. Already in 1589 Lodge had given to the world a volume of poems bearing the title of the chief among them, Scillaes Metamorphosis, Enterlaced with the Unfortunate Love of Glaucus, more briefly known as Glaucus and Scilla. To this tale Shakespeare was possibly indebted for the idea of Venus and Adonis. In a lost work, the Sailor's Kalendar, he must in one way or another have recounted his sea adventures.

If Lodge, as has been supposed, was the Alcon in Colin Clout's Come Home Again, it may have been the influence of Edmund Spenser which led to the composition of Phillis, a volume of sonnets, in which the voice of nature seems only now and then to become audible, published with the narrative poem The Complaynte of Elsired in 1593. A Fig for Momus, on the strength of which he has been called the earliest English satirist, and which contains eclogues addressed to Samuel Daniel and others, an epistle addressed to Michael Drayton, and other pieces, appeared in 1595. (Note: Thomas Woodford, Drayton's partner in the development of the Whitefriars Theatre, was the nephew of Thomas Lodge the dramatist by the 1573 marriage of his sister Joan Lodge to the prominent London Grocer Gamaliel Woodford.)

== Academic works ==
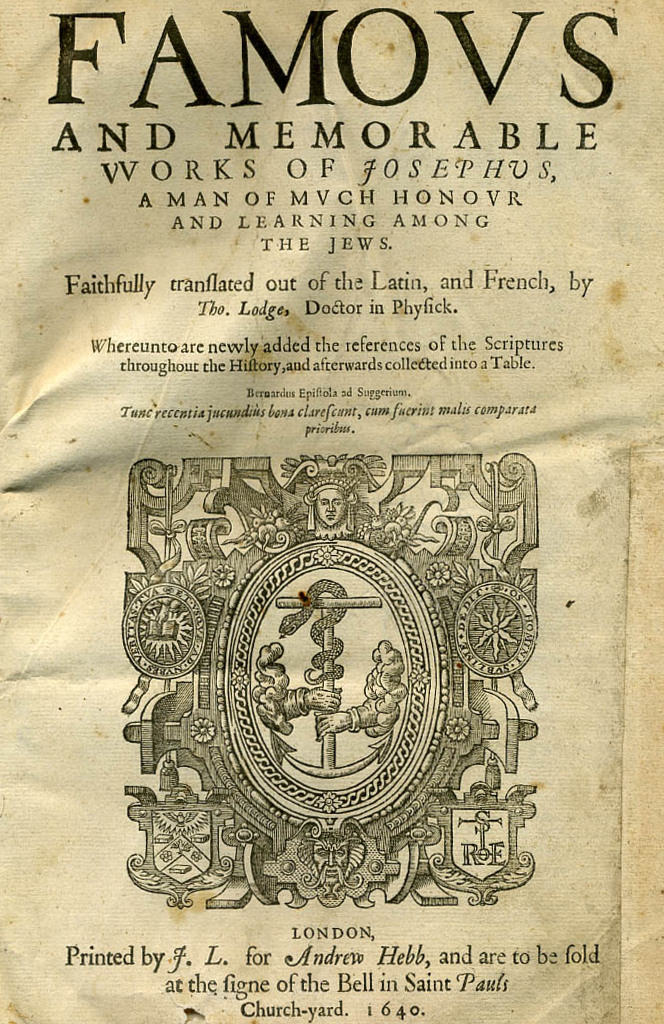
1640 edition of the translation of the works of Josephus

After Lodge received his M.D. from Oxford University, his works from then on take on a more serious note, comprising translations of Josephus (1602), of Seneca (1614), a Learned Summary of Du Bartas's Divine Sepmaine (1625 and 1637). He also wrote medical literature including the Treatise of the Plague (1603), The poore Mans Talentt (c. 1623), and a popular manual, which remained unpublished, on Domestic Medicine.

== Family ==
Lodge seems to have married his first wife Joan in or before 1583, when, "impressed with the uncertainty of human life", he made a will. That his family viewed his conduct at the time with disfavour may be inferred from the absence of his name from his father's will in 1583. Lodge and Joan had a daughter Mary. He married secondly Jane, widow of Solomon Aldred, at one time a Roman Catholic agent of Francis Walsingham in Rome.

== Bibliography ==
- Alsop, J.D. (2004). "Laxton, Sir William (d. 1556)". Oxford Dictionary of National Biography (online ed.). Oxford University Press. doi:10.1093/ref:odnb/16214. (Subscription, Wikipedia Library access or UK public library membership required.)
- Bishai, Nadia (2012). "At the Signe of the Gunne: Titus Andronicus, the London Book Trade, and the Literature of Crime, 1590–1615". In Stanavage, Liberty; Hehmeyer, Paxton (eds.). Titus out of Joint: Reading the Fragmented Titus Andronicus. Newcastle upon Tyne: Cambridge Scholars Publishing. pp. 7–48. ISBN 978-1-4438-3762-0.
- Collier, John Payne, ed. (1843). A Defence of Poetry, Music, and Stage-Plays, by Thomas Lodge of Lincoln's Inn. London: Shakespeare Society.
- Halasz, Alexandra (2004). "Lodge, Thomas (1558–1625)". Oxford Dictionary of National Biography (online ed.). Oxford University Press. doi:10.1093/ref:odnb/16923. (Subscription, Wikipedia Library access or UK public library membership required.)
- Sisson, Charles J. (1931). Thomas Lodge and Other Elizabethans. New York: Octagon Books Inc. pp. 1–164.
- Tenney, Edward Andrews (1969) [1935]. Thomas Lodge. Cornell Studies in English. Vol. 26 (reprinted ed.). Ithaca, NY: Russell & Russell.

Attribution

- This article incorporates text from a publication now in the public domain: Lee, Sidney (1893). "Lodge, Thomas (1558?–1625)". In Lee, Sidney (ed.). Dictionary of National Biography. Vol. 34. London: Smith, Elder & Co. pp. 60–66.
