= Gallathea =

Elizabethan comedy by John Lyly

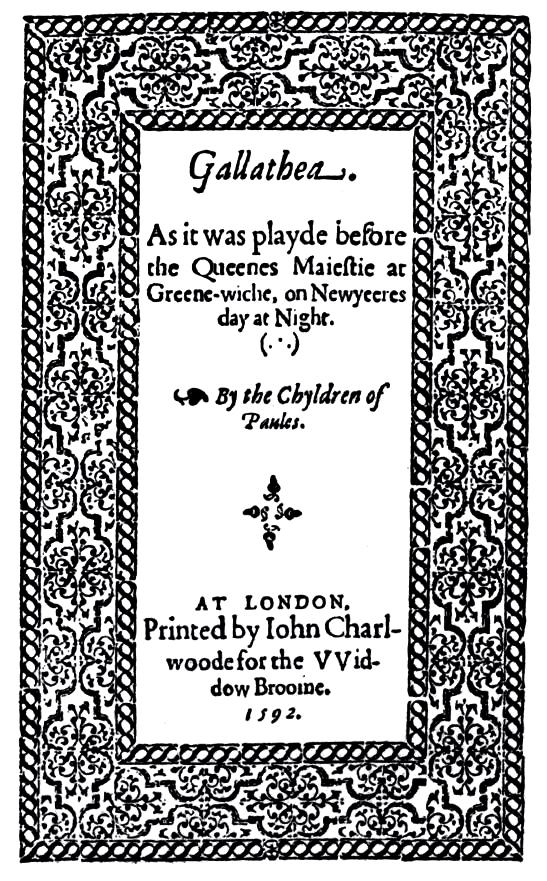
Title page of Gallathea.

Gallathea or Galatea is an Elizabethan era stage play, a comedy by John Lyly. The first record of the play's performance was at Greenwich Palace on New Year's Day, 1588 where it was performed before Queen Elizabeth I and her court by the Children of St Paul's, a troupe of boy actors. At this point in his literary career, Lyly had already achieved success with his prose romance Euphues and was a writer in residence at Blackfriars theatre. The play is set in a village on the Lincolnshire shore of the Humber estuary and in the neighboring woods. It features a host of characters including Greek deities, nymphs, fairies, and some shepherds.

== Plot ==
The play opens in a small village somewhere in Lincolnshire with the shepherd Tyterus informing his daughter Gallathea of Neptune's demands. Every five years, the village must sacrifice the fairest virgin to Neptune, or he will drown them all. This demand is payment for the destruction of Neptune's temples many years ago. Upon her selection, the virgin is tied to a tree in the woods where Neptune's terrifying monster Agar shall appear. Gallathea is one of the fairest maidens in the village and Tyterus believes she will be the chosen sacrifice. To save his daughter, Tyterus decides that she should adopt male attire and hide in the woods. The shepherd Melebeus also has a beautiful daughter, Phillida, and is equally worried she will be this year's sacrifice. He concocts the same plan as Tyterus and informs Phillida that it is the only way to avoid being sacrificed. Phillida agrees to the plan, even though she is sceptical of whether she can successfully pass as a boy, explaining the disguise "will neither become my bodie nor my minde" (1.3.15). Both girls are instructed to hide in the nearby woods until the day of sacrifice has passed. Meanwhile, Cupid encounters one of Diana's nymphs in the woods. After several flirtatious attempts, she refuses his amorous advances due to her vow of chastity, which infuriates the god. He resolves to cause mischief for the goddess Diana and her chaste, virginal followers.

The audience are also introduced to Raffe, Robin and Dicke, the three Miller's sons who are shipwrecked in Lincolnshire. This is the beginning of an amusing subplot that continues throughout the play.

Act II begins with Gallathea and Phillida wandering the woods in their male disguises. The two girls struggle with how they should act as boys and have taken the names Tyterus II and Melebeus II respectively. Their speech is remarkably similar, using identical metre and vocabulary. The two meet and are immediately attracted to one another, unaware that the other is female. The confusion is heightened by the arrival of Diana. The play relies on the characters' confusion for humour; only the audience is aware that Gallathea and Phillida are both females. There is also a lot of pun-based humour: Diana states she is hunting deer which Gallathea confuses as "dear", worrying that Diana seeks out Phillida and that she must compete with the goddess for Phillida's affections. By this time, Gallathea and Phillida are completely in love with each other. Each has a soliloquy where they complain about how unfortunate it is that they have fallen in love with one another.

Cupid informs the audience that he will disguise himself as a nymph and join Diana's hunting party. Once he has infiltrated the group, he plans to make the nymphs fall in love with Gallathea and Phillida. Neptune appears on stage, furious that the shepherds have disguised the fairest virgins as boys. He vows revenge and enters the woods. The nymphs Ramia and Eurota fall in love with Gallathea while Telusa falls for Phillida. Diana is furious when the nymphs' romantic feelings are revealed. She admonishes them all, declaring that Diana's Chase will not become Venus's Court. Cupid's trickery is discovered, and Diana threatens him with her displeasure and punishment unless he undoes the love spells.

By Act IV, the confusions begin to resolve. Diana forces Cupid to reverse the spells and free the nymphs from their infatuation. Gallathea and Phillida become more enamored with each other, although each does come to suspect that the other is actually a girl in disguise. In the meantime, Raffe, Robin and Dicke encounter three different characters: the Mariner, the Alchemist and the Astronomer. Each tradesman offers the brothers advice. Raffe is the most confident and intelligent of the three, and the audience sees how he reaches his own conclusions from the advice given to him. The three brothers frequently break out into song, which humorously details their position in life.

Back in the village, Tyterus and Melebeus accuse one another of having a fair daughter, worthy of being sacrificed. However, both deny the existence of their daughters: Tyterus claims he doesn't have one, and Melebeus claims Phillida died in infancy. With neither man admitting to hiding their daughters, the villagers choose another sacrifice. Hebe is brought out as a substitute. She bemoans her tragic fate and her plain visage in the longest speech of the play. However, Neptune's monster does not appear, thus refusing Hebe as a sacrifice. In a comedic twist, Hebe complains how unfortunate and unlucky she is; in death she would have been remembered as the most beautiful but now she must live with the shame that she is not fair enough for Neptune. The villager Ericthinis delivers the crushing judgement that it would have been better for everyone if Hebe had been more beautiful.

The confusion is finally resolved in Act V Scene III. Neptune rages about the stage threatening the village, the shepherds, Diana and her followers for conspiring against him. Diana appears and challenges him, although she is quickly followed by Venus. Venus is angry that Diana has been keeping Cupid captive. The two engage in a debate over chastity and love. Finally, a truce is brokered; Diana hands Cupid over and Neptune revokes his call for virgin sacrifices. Gallathea and Phillida are revealed to be girls, at which they feign horror. They still profess their love for each other, to the confusion of Diana and Neptune. Venus declares that she "Like[s] well and allow[s] it," and that she shall turn one into a boy so that they can continue to love one another. Venus does not specify which girl will be turned into a boy. Raffe, Robin and Dicke arrive onstage. They claim to be fortune tellers, meaning that they can tell the assembled audiences of their adventures in the woods. Their experience pays off and they become minstrels who will sing at weddings. However, the wedding and transformation of one girl into a boy are never shown. Instead, the play concludes with an Epilogue which asks ladies to yield to love, insisting that love is infallible and conquers all things.

== Characters ==
- Tyterus, a shepherd
- Gallathea, his daughter, disguised as Tyterus II
- Melebeus, a shepherd
- Phillida, his daughter, disguised as Melebuss II
- Venus, goddess of love
- Cupid, god of affection and desire and son of Venus
- Neptune, god of the sea
- Diana, goddess of virginity and of the hunt
- Telusa, a nymph of Diana
- Eurota, a nymph of Diana
- Ramia, a nymph of Diana
- Larissa, a nymph of Diana
- Another Nymph of Diana
- Ericthinis, another countryman of the shepherds
- Hebe, his virgin daughter
- An Augur
- Raffe, son of a Miller, brother of Robin and Dicke
- Robin, son of a Miller, brother of Raffe and Dicke
- Dicke, son of a Miller, brother of Raffe and Robin
- A Mariner
- An Alchemist
- Peter, servant to an Alchemist
- An Astronomer
- Fairies
- Two countrymen of the shepherds

== Early history ==
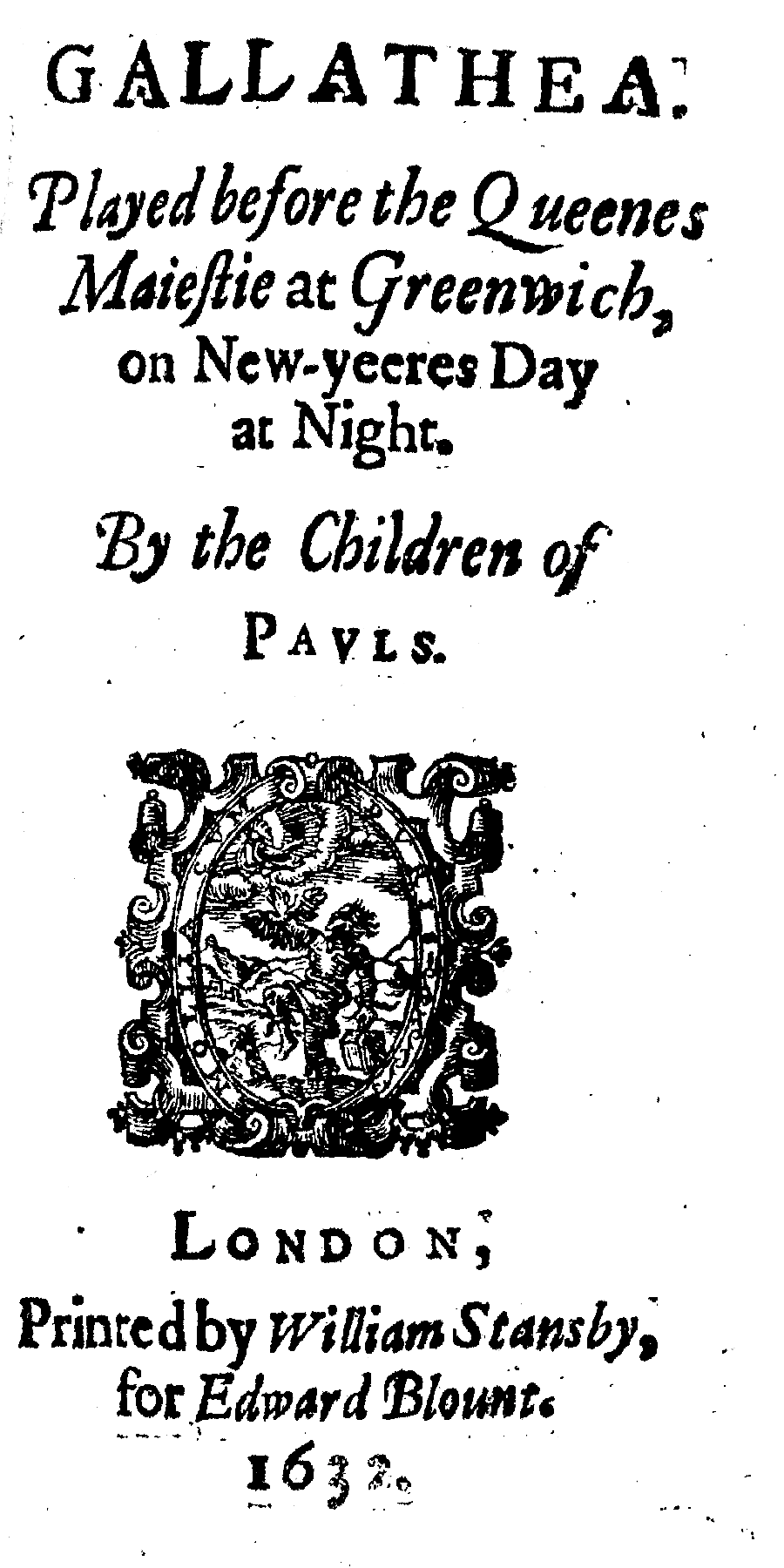
Gallathea, individual title page in Six Court Comedies (1632)

A play titled Titirus and Galathea was entered into the Stationers' Register on 1 April 1585. Some scholars have speculated that this play, otherwise unknown, may have been an early version of Lyly's work – though the point is open to doubt, since what clearly was Lyly's play was entered into the Register on 4 October 1591, along with his Endymion and Midas. Gallathea was acted at the royal palace at Greenwich before Queen Elizabeth I by the Children of Paul's, most likely on 1 January 1588 (new style). Gallathea was first printed in 1592, in a quarto printed by John Charlwood for Joan Broome (the widow of bookseller William Broome, who had published reprints of Lyly's Campaspe and Sapho and Phao in 1591). Gallathea was next printed in Six Court Comedies (1632), the first collected edition of Lyly's works.

== Criticism, analysis and interpretation ==
Gallathea is one of the lesser-known plays from the Early Modern period, but its influences are undeniable. The theme of cross-dressing is repeated throughout the period and carries on into other eras of literature. During the Early Modern period in England, all female roles on the public stage were played by young boys. Within Gallathea, we have boys playing girls playing boys, which heightens the comedic elements in the text. Shakespeare is clearly influenced by the play and there are many similarities in As You Like It and Twelfth Night. Each of these plays feature boy actors playing the role of a woman who disguises herself as a boy. In Twelfth Night, Viola is shipwrecked and dresses herself as Caesario whereas Rosalind in As You Like It adopts the male persona Ganymede and hides in the forest of Arden. Rosalind falls in love with Orlando in her disguise and Olivia falls in love with Caesario. However, hetero-normative conventions prevail in each text. Even though cross dressing is common in the period, it raises interesting theories regarding female sexuality. The homosexual relationship between Gallathea and Phillida is often regarded as asexual; their attraction is genuine but there are no physical displays of affection. The lack of sexuality disregards same sex attraction and stresses the importance of heterosexual relationships. The creation of these androgynous heroines is safe and does not question the heterosexual status quo.

Neptune, Cupid, Diana and Venus share some characteristics. Each demonstrates human emotions and does not behave in a reserved or austere manner. It is possible that Lyly is aware of the repercussions of having child actors play divine beings. The audience are unlikely to take a child playing a Greek deity very seriously. By creating an amusing and insincere portrayal, Lyly is taking full advantage of the limitations of having child actors play the roles. There is further evidence of the children's limitations in the style and metre of the play. Gallathea has a conversational tone and pace. There are few long speeches and the language used by Gallathea and Phillida is, at times, almost identical.

The themes of love, marriage and chastity are found throughout the play. Diana and Venus represent the binary opposites of marriage and chastity and each offer valid arguments in support of each. There is an argument that Diana represents Queen Elizabeth I. The figure of a virgin queen is part of Elizabeth's cultivated image during the period and can be seen in other works, such as in Edmund Spenser's The Faerie Queen. A parallel can be drawn between Elizabeth's ladies-in-waiting and Diana's nymphs. Elizabeth wished her ladies-in-waiting to respect chastity and honour virginity, much as she did.

Modern commentators have praised the play's "harmonious variety" and "allegorical dramaturgy."

== Modern productions ==
=== 20th century ===
The first modern professional revival was in 1905 in Regent's Park, London, in a full production performed by the Idyllic Players by the lake in the Botanic Gardens, directed by Patrick Kirwan.

=== 21st century ===
A production directed by Brett Sullivan Santry, was performed by the students of Stuart Hall School of Staunton, Virginia. When he directed the play, he was an MLitt/MFA graduate student in Shakespeare and Renaissance Literature in Performance at Mary Baldwin College. It ran from 2 to 5 February 2007. In 2008, Kidbrooke School revived Galatea with an all-boys cast. Performed in The Painted Hall in the Old Royal Naval College, Galatea had not been seen in Greenwich since playwright John Lyly gave his new play to the boys of St Paul's to perform at court in front of Elizabeth I on New Year's Day 1588, in Greenwich Palace. An experimental performance was staged by Peter Lichtenfels in November 2010 at the University of California, Davis. The show featured a bare set, audience participation, and video projection.

The Gay Beggars Drama Group from Basel, Switzerland, performed Galatea for eight shows in spring 2011. In May 2017, Maiden Thought Theatre performed it in English at their hometown, Bremen (Germany), bringing play to life in a humorous and current way including the Augur's appearance as a world-famous politician replete with red tie and tiny hands (cf. Donald Trump), as well as numerous references to the 1990s shown in the costumes and original music. In 2021, MJ Kaufman's Galatea or Whatever You Be, a genderqueer translation of Gallathea by John Lyly, was debuted in New York. Described as a "trans love story set against the backdrop of a climate crisis", the work was directed by Mo Zhou. The Shakespeare in the Dark troupe of the College of William & Mary performed a fully staged production of Gallathea in 2023, at the Commonwealth Auditorium on the college's campus in Williamsburg, Virginia. Topher Zane directed.
