= Midas (Lyly play) =

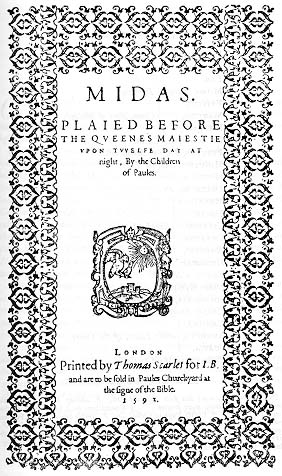
Title page of Midas.

Midas is an Elizabethan era stage play, a comedy written by John Lyly. It is arguably the most overtly and extensively allegorical of Lyly's allegorical plays.

== Performance and production ==
Midas was entered into the Stationers' Register on 4 October 1591; it was first published in 1592 in a quarto printed by Thomas Scarlet for Joan Broome. She was the widow of William Broome, the bookseller who issued reprints of Lyly's Campaspe and Sapho and Phao in 1591; the widow Broome herself published the first editions of Lyly's Endymion (1591) and Gallathea (1592).

Midas was probably acted by the Children of Paul's, Lyly's regular company through most of his playwriting career. The title page of the first edition states that the play was performed at Court on Twelfth Night, probably on 6 January 1590. John Dover Wilson proposed that Lyly himself may have played the role of Midas; but this is a speculation unsupported by evidence.

"Obviously" the play was written after the defeat of the Spanish Armada in 1588. The play also features an allusion to the English Armada of 1589; the authorship of Midas must date from the 1588–89 period.

The student theatre ensemble of Stuart Hall School, located in Staunton, Virginia, staged a production of Midas in 2010 directed by Theatre Programme Director, Brett Sullivan Santry. The performers, who ranged in age from eleven to seventeen, rehearsed and performed under the tenets of Original staging practices from the Elizabethan period. Given the play's extremely limited modern production history, the probability exists that the Stuart Hall production marked the first time the play was staged in North America.

== Synopsis ==
Lyly based his play on the treatment of the Midas story given in Book xi of the Metamorphoses of Ovid; he departs from Ovid's version mainly to strengthen the allegorical aspects of the play (see below). He exploits both aspects of the Midas legend in classical mythology – the golden touch and the ass's ears.

Bacchus, the god of wine, rewards the hospitality of Midas, king of Phrygia, by offering him anything he desires. The king's three courtiers, Eristus, Martius, and Mellicrates, variously advise him to choose rewards that center on love, war, and wealth; Midas accepts the advice of Mellicrates and asks that everything he touches turn to gold. (In the classic legend, Midas is motivated simply by greed; in Lyly's play, Midas wants gold partly to finance his planned invasion of the island of Lesbos, an idea that winds throughout the play.)

In the play as in the myth, Midas's misfortunes with his golden touch follow; his clothes, food, wine, and even his beard all turn to gold. Midas eventually cures himself by taking the advice of Bacchus and bathing in the river Pactolus, which becomes gold-producing as a result. In the second phase of the king's adventures, Midas, hunting in a wood on Mount Tmolus, encounters Apollo and Pan, who are preparing to engage in a musical competition. Midas thrusts himself into the role of judge, and decides in favor of Pan; Apollo responds by giving the king the ears of an ass. Midas conceals his affliction at first, but the news passes from nymphs to shepherds, and is eventually whispered by reeds to all the world.

Midas's sensible daughter Sophronia (a Lylian addition) appeals to Apollo's oracle at Delphi for guidance. Midas goes to Delphi, admits his foolishness and expresses repentance; his auricular affliction is cured, and a newly humbled Midas renounces his plans for conquest, especially against the stalwart islanders of Lesbos.

The play has a more overtly comic subplot focused on Motto, Midas's barber. Motto comes into possession of Midas's golden beard after removing it from the king's face; but the beard is stolen from him by the mischievous pages that are a standard feature of Lyly's drama. Motto recovers the beard by curing a case of toothache (barbers doubled as dentists in Lyly's era, and for long before and after). But the pages exploit Motto's role in spreading the news about the king's ass-ears: they accuse him of treason, and demand and obtain the beard as the price of their silence.

== Allegory ==
It is universally recognized that Lyly's Midas represents the fabulously wealthy Philip II of Spain, while the island of Lesbos that he longs to conquer is Elizabeth's England. Nicholas John Halpin, in his Oberon's Vision (1834), offered a complex and detailed interpretation of the fine points of Lyly's allegory, in which the Pactolus is the Tagus River in Portugal; the barber Motto is Philip II's secretary Antonio Pérez, who was banished for betraying royal secrets; Martius is the Duke of Medina Sedonia, while Mellicrates is the Duke of Alva; Eristus is Ruy Gomez de Libra; and Sophronia is Philip's daughter Isabella Clara Eugenia, among various other identifications. Critics rarely go so far as to embrace all of Halpin's points, though most concede some of the more obvious, like Sophronia/Isabella.
