= Love's Metamorphosis =

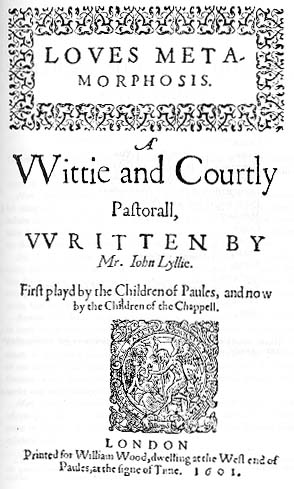
Title page of Love's Metamorphosis.

Love's Metamorphosis is an Elizabethan era stage play, an allegorical pastoral written by John Lyly. It was the last of his dramas to be printed.

== Performance and Publication ==
Love's Metamorphosis was entered into the Stationers' Register on 25 November 1600, and was first published in 1601 in a quarto issued by the bookseller William Wood. The title page of the 1601 quarto calls the play a "witty and courtly pastoral," and states that it was first staged by the Children of Paul's, the troupe of child actors that was Lyly's regular company, and "now" (c. 1600) by the Children of the Chapel. "Probably the Paul's boys produced it c. 1589–90, and the Chapel revived it in 1600–1."

Love's Metamorphosis was left out of Six Court Comedies (1632), the first collected edition of Lyly's plays; and there is no evidence that it was ever a "Court comedy," that it was ever acted at Court. The play was not reprinted until F. W. Fairholt's 1858 edition of Lyly's collected works.

== Sources ==
Lyly borrowed some elements for his play (the story of Erisichthon) from the Metamorphoses of Ovid, and others from a 1588 prose pamphlet by Robert Greene, known alternatively as Greene's Metamorphosis and Alcida. Most of the play, however, is judged to be original with Lyly.

== Synopsis ==
Set in Arcadia, the play's plot contains two strains: the main plot features Ceres and three of her nymphs, Nisa, Celia, and Niobe; the three foresters or shepherds who love them, Ramis, Montanus, and Silvestris; and Cupid. Cupid punishes the nymphs for their disdain of the shepherds, by transforming them into a rock, a rose, and a bird.

The subplot involves the churlish and brutal peasant Erisichthon, who chops down a sacred tree and thereby takes the life of Fidelia, a transformed nymph. Ceres punishes him with famine, and he responds by selling his daughter Protea to a merchant. Protea escapes her servitude via a prayer to Neptune and a disguise as a fisherman; she returns home, and masquerades as the revenging ghost of Ulysses to rescue Petulius, her beloved, from a Siren.

Ceres appeals to Cupid to release her nymphs; Cupid agrees, if Ceres will pardon Erisichthon. (The faithful love of Protea for Petulius has earned her Cupid's protection.) The nymphs are restored to their original forms once they agree to accept the three humans as husbands; the quadruple wedding is held at the house of Erisichthon.

Love's Metamorphosis differs from most of Lyly's plays in that it lacks the overtly comical and farcical elements that Lylian dramas normally possess. Strikingly, the play features none of the witty pages that are standard for Lyly. As a result, some critics have speculated that the extant text is a revised version of a more typical Lyly original.

== Allegory ==
The play is widely recognized as possessing a significant element of allegory, and is generally classed with Lyly's other allegorical works — though critics dispute the degree, meaning, and specific interpretation of the allegory. The play's goddess figure, Ceres, has traditionally been taken to represent Queen Elizabeth I; yet some commentators have complained that unlike Sapho, or Cynthia in Endymion, Ceres doesn't much resemble Elizabeth in any substantive way.

The circumstances involving the play's nymphs and foresters have been defined as "Petrarchan situations," deriving from the sonnets of Petrarch as interpreted by sixteenth-century English poets in their sonnet sequences.
