= Mother Bombie =

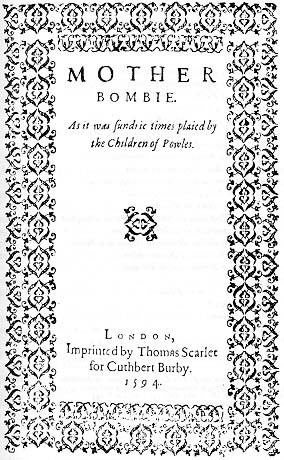
Title page of the first edition of Mother Bombie (1594).

Mother Bombie is an Elizabethan era stage play, a comedy by John Lyly. It is unique in Lyly's dramatic canon as a work of farce and social realism; in Mother Bombie alone, Lyly departs from his dream world of classical allusion and courtly comedy to create a "vulgar realistic play of rustic life" in a contemporaneous England. First published in 1594, the play features a tight, complex plot influenced by Terence and set in Rochester.

== Publication and performance ==
Mother Bombie was entered into the Stationers' Register on 18 June 1594, and was published later that year, in a quarto printed by Thomas Scarlet for the bookseller Cuthbert Burby. Burby issued a second quarto in 1598, the printing done by Thomas Creede. The play was next printed in 1632, when it was included in Six Court Comedies, the initial collection of Lyly's works published by Edward Blount.

No specific early performances of the play are known; the title page of the first edition states that Mother Bombie was "sundry times" acted by the Children of Paul's, Lyly's regular company – performances that must have occurred prior to that company's cessation of activity in 1591. The play's date of authorship is uncertain and conjectural; given the complexity of the play's plot (atypical for Lyly), some critics have regarded Mother Bombie as the last and most technically mature of the dramatist's plays, and have dated it to c. 1590.

Thomas Nashe praised Mother Bombie in his 1596 pamphlet Have With You to Saffron-Walden as a popular and merry comedy. Modern critics have compared Mother Bombie with The Comedy of Errors, Shakespeare's similar classically shaped comedy; both plays feature comic servants named "Dromio."

The play was the subject of a pair of staged readings in recent years: one on 5 December 2010 at Shakespeare's Globe Theatre in London, coordinated by James Wallace and another on 11 March 2012 at the American Shakespeare Center's Blackfriars Playhouse in Staunton, Virginia, directed by Brett Sullivan Santry, featuring a cast of students from Stuart Hall School.

== Source, style, and influence ==
Unlike Lyly's other plays, which can be described as lightly plotted, Mother Bombie has a tight and complex plot. The influence of Terence is obvious – "This is Lyly's single exploration into the Terentian mode of comedy." Except for the title character and one servant, all the characters in the play have Latin names. Yet no specific source for the plot has been determined; the story, apparently, is largely original with Lyly. Commonalities with the contemporary Italian novels that supplied so much plot material to English Renaissance drama are too vague and general to support direct linkages.

"Mother Bumbey" is a folklore figure in the traditional ballad literature; Lyly did not invent her, though he clearly added to her fame. She is mentioned by other writers in subsequent plays: by Thomas Heywood in The Wise Woman of Hogsdon (c. 1604), and in The Witch of Edmonton (1621), by Dekker, Ford, and Rowley.

== Synopsis ==
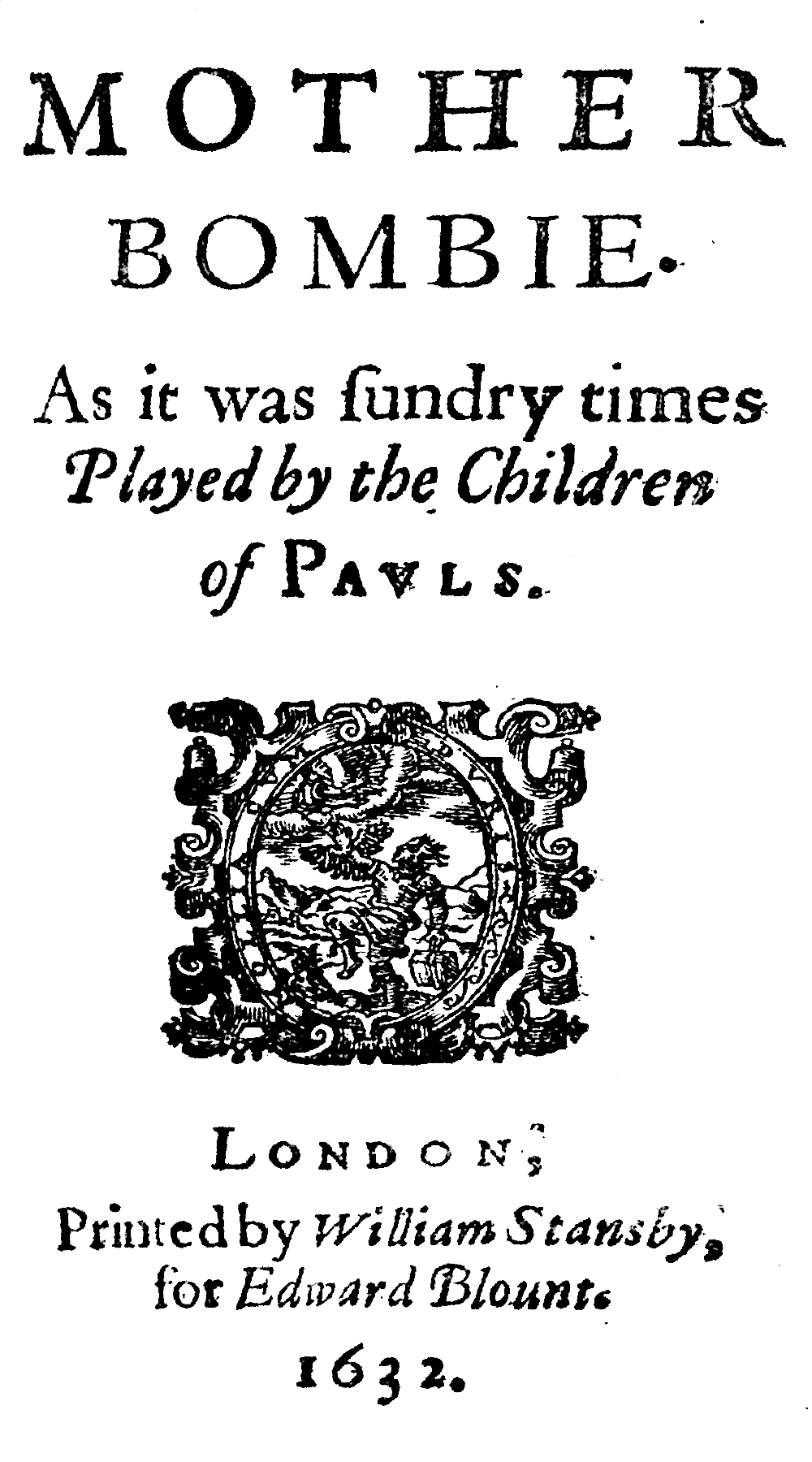
Mother Bombie, individual title page in Six Court Comedies (1632)

Set in Rochester in Kent, the play's plot turns on the marital fortunes of two young couples, and the complicating opposition of their four respective fathers. Memphio and Stellio are two rich old men; they want to arrange an advantageous marriage between their two children, Accius and Silena. Each of the two fathers knows that his child is a simpleton – what the Elizabethans succinctly called a "fool" – but neither knows that his child's prospective partner is also a simpleton. Each father is trying to take advantage of the other, in the same way.

A pair of young lovers named Candius and Livia are the closest the play offers to a hero and heroine; their love is true, but their marriage is opposed by their fathers, Sperantus and Prisius, who want to arrange more lucrative matches for their children. Sperantus, in fact, wants his son Candius to marry the wealthy Silena, while Prisius wants his daughter Livia to wed the rich heir Accius. And of course, since this is the dramatic world of Lyly, each of the four old men has a young page – and all the pages (Dromio, Riscio, Lucio, and Halfpenny) conspire together to manipulate the outcome of their masters' schemes.

Each of the wealthy fathers tries to hide his child's foolishness by disguising them as their poorer but more sensible counterparts – Accius as Candius, Silena as Livia; but the plan falls through and the mutual folly of the two young people is exposed. Conversely, Candius and Livia manage to fool their fathers and marry – by disguising themselves as Accius and Silena. Their fathers, Sperantus and Prisius, eventually reconcile themselves to the idea of their children's marriage. The wealthy fathers, Memphio and Stellio, come close to accepting the same realization, and allowing their foolish children to marry – the idea being that such a marriage is better than no marriage at all.

Yet the foolish marriage is forestalled when the old nurse Vicinia reveals that the two fools are actually her children, and so are brother and sister. Long years before, Vicinia exchanged her children for the rich men's real offspring, who are now called Maestius and Serena. These two, thinking themselves siblings, have been struggling against what they think is a mutual incestuous passion; once they learn that they are not actually related, they can legitimately wed. The rich old men, pleased to have their natural children restored to them, magnanimously agree to provide support for their false imbecilic children; and a happy ending is engineered all around.

Mother Bombie, the local cunning woman, functions rather like a dramatic chorus in all this; characters consult her for advice and she predicts the outcomes of particular situations in doggerel verse. ("Mother Bombie told me my father knew me not, my mother bore me not, falsely bred, truly begot....") She has relatively little direct effect on events, except for convincing Vicinia to expose her secret and thus resolve the plot's difficulties.

== Characters ==
In order of appearance:

- Memphio - wealthy man; believes he is the father of Accius; actually the father of Maestius
- Dromio - Memphio's page
- Stellio - wealthy man; believes he is the father of Silena; actually the father of Serena
- Riscio - Stellio's page
- Prisius - father of Livia
- Sperantus - father of Candius
- Livia - daughter of Priscius
- Candius - son of Sperantus
- Halfpenny - Sperantus' page
- Lucio - Prisius' page
- Silena - simple daughter of Stellio; actually Vicinia's daughter
- Mother Bombie - wise woman
- Maestius - believes he is the brother of Serena and son of Vicinia; actually the son of Memphio
- Serena - believes she is the sister of Maestius and daughter of Vicinia; actually the daughter of Stellio
- Accius - simple son of Memphio; actually Vicinia's son
- Rixula - acquaintance of the pages
- Hackneyman - man who has horses for hire
- Sergeant - enforcer of the law
- Scrivener - scribe
- Vicinia - wet nurse and pseudo-mother for Maestius and Serena; real mother of Accius and Silena
- Synis - fiddler
- Nasutus - fiddler
- Beduneus - fiddler

== "Cunning woman" ==
In Mother Bombie, the title character specifically denies that she is a witch, and calls herself a "cunning woman." The play has attracted the attention of modern scholars interested in feminism, women's studies, the witchcraft controversy, and related issues.
