= 1591 in literature =

This article presents lists of the literary events and publications in 1591.

== Events ==
- May – A dispute with James Burbage impels the Admiral's Men to leave The Theatre and move to Philip Henslowe's Rose Theatre in London.
- Summer – Sir Walter Ralegh secretly marries Elizabeth Throckmorton.
- October 4 – John Lyly's Midas is entered in the Stationers' Register.
- November 8 – Publisher Thomas Millington becomes a "freeman" (full member) of the Stationers' Company.
- Poet and historian Andrea Cornaro founds in Candia (modern-day Heraklion on Crete) the philological academy L’Accademia degli Stravaganti ("Academy of the Strange"), his brother, poet Vitsentzos Kornaros, being among the other members.
- Publication of the first of the Conimbricenses commentaries on Aristotle by the Jesuits of the University of Coimbra, Commentarii Collegii Conimbricensis Societatis Jesu in octo libros physicorum Aristotelis Stagyritæ, on Aristotle's Physics.

== New books ==
=== Prose ===
- Andrea Alciato – Emblemata
- Robert Greene – Greene's Farewell to Folly
- John Greenwood – A Breife Refutation of Mr George Giffard, etc.
- Melis Stoke – Rijmkroniek (History of the Netherlands, written in the 14th century)
- "A. W." – A Book of Cookrye

=== Children ===
- Anonymous – A Pretty and Splendid Maiden's Mirror (in Swedish)

== Drama ==
- Anonymous
  - Fair Em, the Miller's Daughter of Manchester (approximate date of first performance)
  - Mucedorus (approximate date of first performance)
  - The Troublesome Reign of King John (perhaps by George Peele; published)
- John Lyly – Endymion, the Man in the Moon (published)
- Muretus – Julius Caesar (published)
- Robert Wilmot – Tancred and Gismund (published)

=== Poetry ===
- Sir John Harington – Orlando Furioso in English Heroical Verse
- James VI of Scotland – Lepanto
- Sir Philip Sidney (died 1586) – Astrophel and Stella

== Births ==
- March 6 – Tommaso Tamburini, Italian Jesuit theologian (died 1675)
- August – Robert Herrick, English poet (died 1674)
- Unknown dates
  - Thomas Goffe, English dramatist (died 1629)
  - Ivan Bunić Vučić, Ragusa poet (died 1658)

== Deaths ==
- February 28 – Arthur Faunt, English Jesuit missionary (born 1554)
- July 7 – Noël du Fail, French short story writer (born c. 1520)
- July 22 – Veronica Franco, Venetian poet and courtesan (born 1546)
- August 23 – Luis de León, Castilian poet, theologian and orator (born 1527)
- December 21 – John of the Cross, Castilian poet and friar (born 1542)
- Unknown date – Johann Fischart, German satirist (born c. 1545)
