= The Woman in the Moon =

Elizabethan era comedy play

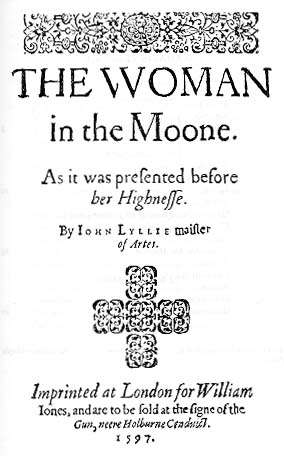
Title page of The Woman in the Moon.

The Woman in the Moon is an Elizabethan era stage play, a comedy written by John Lyly. Its unique status in that playwright's dramatic canon – it is the only play Lyly wrote in blank verse rather than prose – has presented scholars and critics with a range of questions and problems.

== Publication and performance ==
The Woman in the Moon was entered into the Stationers' Register on 22 September 1595, and was first published in quarto in 1597 by the bookseller William Jones. The title page of the quarto states that the play was presented before Queen Elizabeth I, though no specific performance is mentioned.

Although most of Lyly's plays were acted by the children's company Paul's Boys, the playing company that acted this particular work is a mystery. However, The Woman in the Moon is thought to have been first produced between 1590 and 1595, most likely in 1593.

The play's Prologue maintains that the work "is but a poet's dream, / The first he had in Phoebus' holy bower, / But not the last...." Nineteenth-century critics took this statement at face value, and considered The Woman in the Moon the first of Lyly's plays, written sometime in the early 1580s. As such, it would have been an important early development in English dramatic blank verse. Later critics, however, disputed this conclusion, arguing that the Prologue may only mean that this was Lyly's first play in verse, and that in style "The blank verse is that of the nineties, rather than the early eighties." The modern critical consensus tends to favour the view that The Woman in the Moon, far from being Lyly's first play, was likely his last, written in the 1590–95 period.

== Character List ==
In Order of Appearance:

- Nature

- Concord – Nature's Maiden
- Discord – Nature's Maiden

- Pandora
- Stesias – shepherd
- Iphicles – shepherd
- Learchus – shepherd
- Melos – shepherd
- Saturn
- Mars
- Jupiter
- Sol
- Venus
- Mercury
- Luna
- Gunophilus – Pandora's servant
- Ganymede – Jupiter's attendant
- Juno – Jupiter's wife
- Joculus – son of Venus
- Cupid – son of Venus

== Synopsis ==
The play is set in the world of Greek mythology, at the time of the very beginning of the human race, when the first woman was not yet created. A personified goddess of Nature, accompanied by Concord and Discord ("For Nature works her will from contraries"), descends to a pastoral Earth inhabited by four shepherds. At their petition, Nature breathes life into a clothed statue of the first woman. Concord seals her soul to her body with an embrace, and the new woman is given the best gifts of the seven planets of traditional astronomy and astrology. She is named Pandora.

The seven planets, however, are unhappy that Pandora has been given their best qualities, and decide to spite Nature with a malevolent demonstration of their power. Saturn, the eldest, goes first: seating himself on a throne, he afflicts Pandora with his characteristic melancholy. The shepherds meet Pandora when she is suffering this baleful influence; when one tries to kiss her hand, she hits him across the lips. She treats the rest as badly, then runs away. Saturn leaves his throne at the end of the first act, pleased with the mess that he has made.

Jupiter assumes the throne at the start of Act II. He inspires Pandora with ambition, vanity, and superciliousness – so much so that she obtains his sceptre and tosses it to Juno when the queen of the gods comes in search of her husband (he hides himself in a cloud). Pandora inflicts her pride upon the hapless shepherds: she orders them to behead a wild boar, promising her glove to the man who brings the trophy to her. Mars takes over from Jupiter, turning Pandora into a "vixen martialist." The shepherds fight over the dead boar and the right to Pandora's glove – but she grabs a spear and bests them all.

Sol, the Sun, takes over at the start of Act III; for a change, his influence is largely beneficial. Pandora becomes "gentle and kind," and chooses Stesias, one of the shepherds, as her husband. But then comes Venus's turn: Joculus inspires dancing, Cupid shoots his arrows, and romantic disruptions follow. Mercury succeeds Venus in Act IV; he makes Pandora "false and full of sleights, / Thievish and lying, subtle, eloquent...." By Act V, under the influence of Luna, Pandora simply runs mad. Stesias is fed up by now, and the other shepherds want nothing to do with Pandora, even when the seven planetary deities have restored her sanity. With no place for her on Earth, the planets vie for the distinction of taking Pandora up to their individual spheres; Pandora chooses Luna, since they are both inherently changeable.

At the end of the play, Nature chooses to punish Stesias, Pandora's husband, because he is so easily swayed by the opinions of others. He is condemned to "be...her slave, and follow her in the moon." His punishment is to always follow Pandora, but never to act on his anger towards her or inflict pain upon her.

== Interpretations ==
Most critics have judged the play as "a satire on women," an expression of traditional male chauvinism and sexism – though dissent from this view can also be found in the critical literature. Lyly's use of astrology has been seen in the context of the craze for horoscope-casting that typified the Elizabethan era.

Bertolt Brecht suggested that Pandora's erratic behavior under the influence of the planetary deities prefigures later Elizabethan experiments in stage psychology, such as exploring the interactions between cosmic determinism and human action.

== Other performances ==
The play was performed by Bryn Mawr College in 1928. Future actress Katharine Hepburn, who was studying at the university at the time, played the role of Pandora. A production of this play was put on by the Edward's Boys company in March 2018.
