= List of claimed first novels in English =

A number of works of literature have been claimed to be the first novel in English.

== List of candidates ==
- Thomas Malory, Le Morte d'Arthur (a.k.a. Le Morte Darthur), (written c. 1470, published 1485)
- William Baldwin, Beware the Cat, (written 1553, published 1570, 1584)
- John Lyly, Euphues: The Anatomy of Wit (1578) and Euphues and his England (1580)
- Philip Sidney, The Countess of Pembroke's Arcadia (a.k.a. Arcadia) (1581)
- Margaret Cavendish, The Description of a New World, Called The Blazing-World, (a.k.a. The Blazing World) (1666)
- John Bunyan, The Pilgrim's Progress from This World, to That Which Is to Come (1678)
- Aphra Behn, Oroonoko: or, the Royal Slave (1688)
- Anonymous, Vertue Rewarded (1693)
- Daniel Defoe, The Life and Strange Surprizing Adventures of Robinson Crusoe (a.k.a. Robinson Crusoe) (1719) and The Farther Adventures of Robinson Crusoe (also 1719)
- Samuel Richardson, Pamela, or Virtue Rewarded (1740)

== Other relevant works ==
The following are other early long works of prose fiction in English not generally considered novels:

- William Caxton's 1483 translation of Geoffroy de la Tour Landry, The Book of the Knight of the Tower (originally in French)
- Martin Marprelate, an anonymous pseudonym authoring a collection of eight illegal, serialized narratives: “Epistle”, “Epitome”, “Hay Any Work”, “Metaphysical School-points”, “Theses Martinianae”, “Just Censure”, “More Work for Cooper” and “The Protestation” (1588-1589)
- Thomas Nashe, The Unfortunate Traveller, or The Life of Jack Wilton (1594)
- Jonathan Swift, A Tale of a Tub (1704)
- Daniel Defoe, The Consolidator (1705)
- Jonathan Swift, Gulliver's Travels (1726)

== Differing definitions of novel ==
There are multiple candidates for first novel in English partly because of ignorance of earlier works, but largely because the term novel can be defined so as to exclude earlier candidates. (The article for novel contains detailed information on the history of the terms "novel" and "romance" and the bodies of texts they defined in a historical perspective.)

=== Length ===
- Critics typically require a novel to have a certain length. This would exclude both Oroonoko and The Blazing World, arguably novellas.

=== Content and intent ===
- Critics typically require a novel to be wholly original and so exclude retellings such as Le Morte d'Arthur.
- Critics typically make a distinction between collections of short stories, even those sharing common themes and settings, and novels per se, which typically has a single protagonist and narrative throughout. This might also lead to the exclusion of Le Morte d'Arthur.
- Critics typically distinguish between the romance, which has a heroic protagonist and fantastic elements, and the novel, which attempts to present a realistic story. This would, yet again, exclude Le Morte d'Arthur.
- Critics typically distinguish between the allegory (in which characters and events have political, religious or other meanings) and the novel, in which characters and events stand only for themselves, and so exclude The Pilgrim's Progress and A Tale of a Tub.
- Critics typically distinguish between the picaresque, made up of a connected sequence of episodes, and the novel, which has unity of structure, and so exclude The Unfortunate Traveller.

Owing to the influence of Ian Watt's seminal study in literary sociology, The Rise of the Novel: Studies in Defoe, Richardson and Fielding (1957), Watt's candidate, Daniel Defoe's Robinson Crusoe (1719), gained wide acceptance.

== See also ==
- List of first novels by language
- Category:Novels by date for earlier claimants in English and other languages.
