= Sebastian Westcott =

English organist

Sebastian Westcott (also spelt Wescott or Westcote) (c. 1524 – 1582) was an English organist at St. Paul's Cathedral. He is especially known for staging performances of plays with the Children of Paul's.

== Life ==
Westcott was a chorister, under John Redford, at St. Paul's Cathedral, London, and in 1550 became organist and almoner of the cathedral. In 1557 he became master of Children of Paul's, the boys of that cathedral. He retained his post at St. Paul's, under Edward VI, Queen Mary, and Queen Elizabeth I, from 1550 to 1582, notwithstanding the fact that he was an avowed Catholic. Westcott is best known for the many plays and pageants, with music, which he produced for the English Court during a period of 32 years, these plays being performed by the boys of the cathedral school. So celebrated was he in this respect that he was generally referred to as "Master Sebastian".

Under Queen Mary he had the honour of arranging the music for the formal restoration of Catholicism at St. Paul's, in November 1553. He also composed the Te Deum which was sung on 9 February 1554, on the suppression of Wyatt's rebellion. He conducted the service for the reception of Cardinal Reginald Pole on the first Sunday of Advent, 1554, when the motet Te spectant Reginalde Pole, by Orlande de Lassus, was sung. Di Lassus was in England at this time, as was also Philippe de Monte, and both were probably present.

Under Elizabeth I, in 1559, Westcott refused to subscribe to the Thirty-Nine Articles, yet official documents from 1559 to 1561 prove that "Master Sebastian" was well paid for his musical and dramatic performances. In May 1561 the Catholic propagandist Nicholas Sander, in a report to Cardinal Morone, highly praised Westcott. In 1561 Bishop Edmund Grindal summoned him for refusing to take part in the Anglican Communion, and in July 1563 excommunicated him. Lord Robert Dudley, the Queen's favourite, intervened for him, however, and Bishop Grindal answered at length, apologizing, and explaining his action, though declining to suspend his verdict, only to suspend it for a while. 14 years later, in December 1577, Westcott was deprived by Bishop John Aylmer and imprisoned in the Marshalsea as a recusant. Apparently, Queen Elizabeth missed her customary Christmas plays by the choristers of St. Paul's, and so Westcott was released on 19 March 1578. Westcott died in 1582, leaving assets of considerable value.
