= Euphuism =

Affected, bombastic style of language

Euphuism is an elegant literary style that was briefly in fashion during the Elizabethan era. The euphuism style employed the frequent use of alliteration, antithesis, balance, and simile, with references to nature and mythological tales. Euphuism was fashionable in the 1580s, especially in the Elizabethan court. Its origins can be traced back to Spanish writer Antonio de Guevara, whose ornate, manierist courtesan prose became very popular throughout Europe, and whose work The Clock of the Princes, translated into English in 1557 by Thomas North, reached its peak in popularity during Elizabeth I's reign.

== Euphues (1580) ==
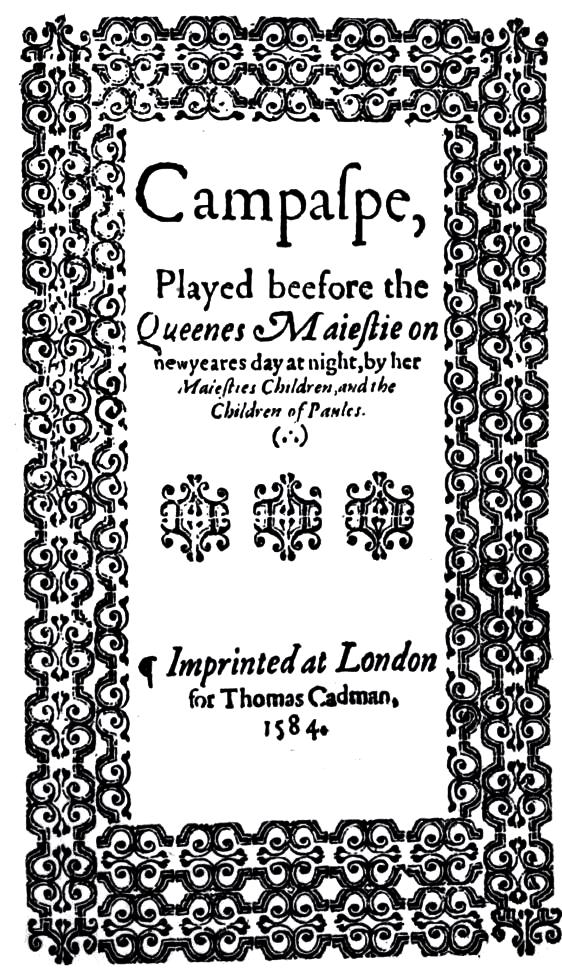
Title page of Campaspe by John Lyly, 1584

"Euphues" (εὐφυής) is the Greek for "graceful, witty". John Lyly published the works Euphues: The Anatomy of Wit (1578) and Euphues and his England (1580). Both works illustrated the intellectual fashions and favourite themes of Renaissance society— in a highly artificial and mannered style. The plots are unimportant, existing merely as structural elements on which to display conversations, discourses and letters mostly concerning the subject of love. Its essential features had already appeared in such works as George Pettie's A Petite Pallace of Pettie his pleasure (1576), in sermon literature, and Latin tracts. Lyly perfected the distinctive rhetorical devices on which the style was based.

== Principles ==
The euphuistic sentence followed principles of balance and antithesis to their extremes, purposely using the latter regardless of sense. John Lyly set up three basic structural principles:

- phrases of equal length that appear in succession
- the balance of key verbal elements in successive sentences
- the correspondence of sounds and syllables, especially between words that are already balanced against each other

== Examples ==
"It is virtue, yea virtue, gentlemen, that maketh gentlemen; that maketh the poor rich, the base-born noble, the subject a sovereign, the deformed beautiful, the sick whole, the weak strong, the most miserable most happy. There are two principal and peculiar gifts in the nature of man, knowledge and reason; the one commandeth, and the other obeyeth: these things neither the whirling wheel of fortune can change, neither the deceitful cavillings of worldlings separate, neither sickness abate, neither age abolish". (Euphues, the Anatomy of Wit)

"Is it not far better to abhor sins by the remembrance of others' faults, than by repentance of thine own follies?" (Euphues, 1, lecture by the wise Neapolitan)

"Can any treasure in this transitory pilgrimmage be of more value than a friend? In whose bosom thou mayest sleep secure without fear, whom thou mayest make partner of all thy secrets without suspicion of fraud, and partaker of all thy misfortune without mistrust of fleeting. Who will account thy bale his bane, thy mishap his misery, the pricking of thy finger the piercing of his heart." (Euphues)

"How frantic are those lovers which are carried away with the gay glistering of the fine face? The beauty whereof is parched with the summer's blaze and chipped with the winter's blast: which is of so short continuance, that it fadeth before one perceive it flourish". (Euphues' after-dinner speech to the 'coy' Neapolitan ladies on whether the qualities of the mind or the composition of the man are more worthy).

"Time hath weaned me from my mother's teat, and age rid me from my father's correction". (Lucilla, considering her father's reaction in abandoning her fiancé Philanthus for Euphues).

"A sharp sore hath a short cure" (Euphues)

"As they be hard to be won without trial of great faith, so are they hard to be lost without great cause of fickleness". (Euphues to Lucilla on the quality of 'fervency' in women).

"But alas Euphues, what truth can there be found in a traveller? What stay in a stranger? Whose words and bodies both watch but for a wind, whose feet are ever fleeting, whose faith plighted on the shore, is turned to perjury when they hoist sail". (Lucilla to Euphues).

== Legacy ==
Many critics did not appreciate Lyly's deliberate excesses. Philip Sidney and Gabriel Harvey castigated his style, as did Aldous Huxley in his book On the Margin: Notes and Essays, who wrote, "Take away from Lyly his erudition and his passion for antithesis, and you have Mrs. Ros."

Lyly's style, however, influenced Shakespeare, who satirised it in speeches by Polonius and Osric in Hamlet and the florid language of the courtly lovers in Love's Labour's Lost; Beatrice and Benedick in Much Ado About Nothing also made use of it, as did Richard and Lady Anne in Richard III. It was taken up by the Elizabethan writers Robert Greene, Thomas Lodge and Barnabe Rich. Walter Scott satirised it in the character of Sir Piercie Shafton in The Monastery, while Charles Kingsley defended Euphues in Westward Ho!.

== Contemporary equivalents in other languages ==
Euphuism was not particular to Britain, nor a manifestation of some social structure or artistic opportunity unique to that country. There were equivalents in other major European languages, each of which was called by a different name: culteranismo in Spain, Marinismo in Italy, and préciosité in France, for example.

== See also ==
- Periodic sentence
- Purple prose

== Sources ==
- Concise Oxford Dictionary of English Literature, Oxford, 1957. pp. 166/7.
