= John Lyly =

English writer, dramatist, courtier, and Member of Parliament. (c. 1553/54–1606)

John Lyly M.A. (Oxon) & (Cantab)
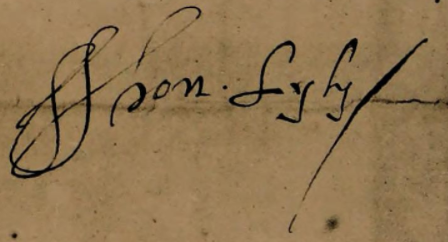
- Lyly's signature, from a letter to Sir Robert Cecil, 4 Feb. 1602–3
- Born: c. 1553/54; Kent, England
- Died: Buried 30 November 1606 (age 52); London, England
- Resting place: St Bartholomew-the-Less, London
- Education: Magdalen College, Oxford
- Occupations: Writer, dramatist, courtier, and Member of Parliament
- Parent(s): Peter Lyly and Jane Burgh
- Relatives: William Lily (grandfather); George Lily (uncle)
- Writing career
- Language: Early Modern English
- Years active: 1578–1602
- Notable works: Euphues: The Anatomy of Wit; Euphues and his England; Campaspe; Sapho and Phao; Gallathea; Endymion; Midas; Mother Bombie; Love's Metamorphosis; The Woman in the Moon
- Movement: English Renaissance

John Lyly (/ˈlɪli/; also spelled Lilly, Lylie, Lylly; born c. 1553/54 – buried 30 November 1606) was an English writer, playwright, courtier, and parliamentarian. He first achieved success with his two books Euphues: The Anatomy of Wit (1578) and its sequel Euphues and His England (1580), and then became a dramatist, writing eight plays which survive, at least six of which were performed before Queen Elizabeth I. Lyly's distinctive and much imitated literary style, named after the title character of his two books, is known as euphuism. He is sometimes grouped with other professional dramatists of the 1580s and 1590s like Christopher Marlowe, Robert Greene, Thomas Nashe, George Peele, and Thomas Lodge, as one of the so-called University Wits. He has been credited by some scholars with writing the first English novel, and as being 'the father of English comedy'.

== Biography ==
=== Childhood and education ===
John Lyly was born in Kent in the Kingdom of England, c. 1553/54, the eldest son of Peter Lyly and his wife, Jane Burgh (or Brough), of Burgh Hall in the North Riding of Yorkshire. He was probably born either in Rochester, where his father is recorded as a notary public in 1550, or in Canterbury, where his father was the Registrar for the Archbishop, Matthew Parker, and where the births of his siblings are recorded between 1562 and 1568. His paternal grandfather was William Lily, the grammarian and the first High (or Head) Master of St Paul's School, London. His uncle, George Lily, was a scholar and cartographer, and served as domestic chaplain to Reginald Pole, Archbishop of Canterbury.

Lyly was probably educated at King's School, Canterbury, where his younger brothers are recorded as contemporaries of Christopher Marlowe. He was about 15 years old when, in October 1569, his father died. Peter's will made his wife Jane and his son John his joint executors and named "my dwelling house... called the Splayed Eagle", close by Canterbury Cathedral on either Sun Street or Palace Street. They sold the house fourteen months later, in January 1571.

In 1571, at the age of 16, Lyly became a student at Magdalen College, Oxford, where he is recorded as having received his bachelor's degree on 27 April 1573, and his master's two years later on 19 May 1575. In his address "To my very good friends the gentlemen scholars of Oxford" at the end of the second edition of his Anatomy of Wit, he complains about a sentence of rustication apparently passed on him at some time during his university career, but nothing more is known about either its date or its cause. According to Anthony Wood, while Lyly had the reputation of "a noted wit", he never took kindly to the proper studies of the university:

For so it was that his genius being naturally bent to the pleasant paths of poetry (as if Apollo had given to him a wreath of his own bays without snatching or struggling) did in a manner neglect academical studies, yet not so much but that he took the degrees in arts, that of master being compleated 1575.

While at Oxford, Lyly wrote to William Cecil, Lord Burghley, on 16 May 1574, to seek his assistance in applying for the Queen's letters to admit him as fellow at Magdalen College. Although the fellowship was not granted, later letters to Burghley show that their connection continued after he left university. In the Glasse for Europe, in the second part of Euphues (1580), Lyly described how grateful he felt towards him:

This noble man I found so ready being but a straunger to do me good, that neyther I ought to forget him, neyther cease to pray for him, that as he hath the wisdom of Nestor, so he may have the age, that having the policies of Ulysses he may have his honor, worthy to lyve long, by whom so many lyve in quiet, and not unworthy to be advaunced by whose care so many have been preferred.

=== Writer and dramatist ===
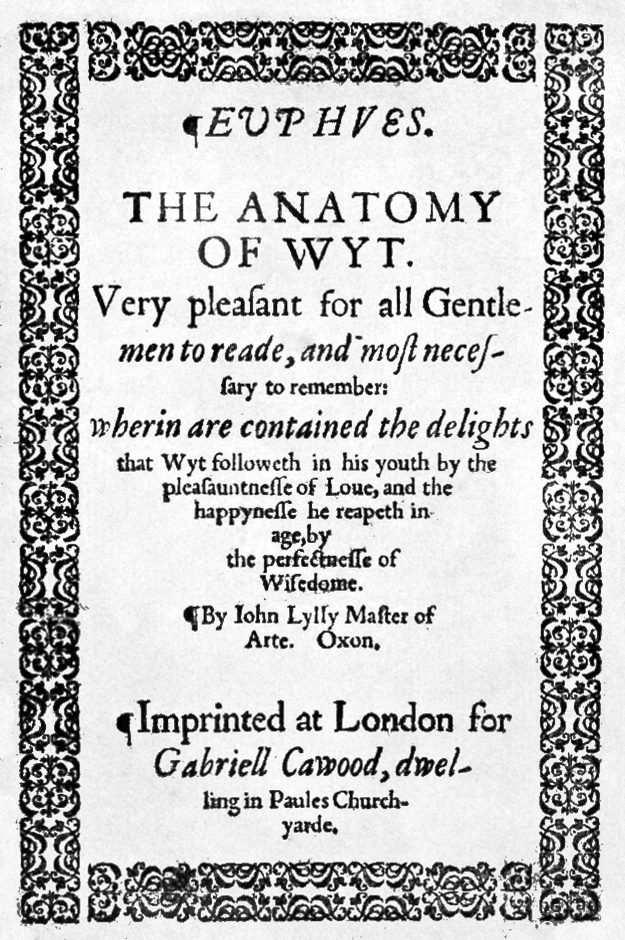
Title page of Euphues, the book that launched Lyly's writing career

At some point after university Lyly moved to London, finding lodgings at the fashionable residence of the Savoy Hospital on the Strand, where Gabriel Harvey described him as "a dapper & a deft companion" and "a pert-conceited youth." Here he began his literary career, writing his first book Euphues: The Anatomy of Wit. It was licensed to Gabriel Cawood on 2 December 1578 and printed that year with a dedication to William West, 1st Baron De La Warr, and a second expanded edition immediately followed in 1579. In the same year Lyly was incorporated M.A. at the University of Cambridge. The Anatomy of Wit was an instant success, and Lyly quickly followed it with a sequel, Euphues and his England, licensed to Cawood on 24 July, and published in 1580. Like the first, it won immediate popularity. Between them, the two works went through over thirty editions by 1630. As Leah Scragg, their most recent editor, describes them, they would "prove the literary sensation of the age".

For a time Lyly was the most successful and fashionable of English writers, hailed as the author of "a new English", as a "raffineur de l'Anglois"; and, as Edward Blount, one of the publishers of his plays, wrote in 1632, "that beautie in court which could not parley Euphuism was as little regarded as she which nowe there speakes not French". Lyly's prose style was much imitated, for example by Barnabe Rich in his Second Tome of the Travels and Adventures of Don Simonides, 1584; by Robert Greene in his Menaphon, Camilla's Alarum to Slumbering Euphues, 1589; and by Thomas Lodge in his Rosalynde, Euphues Golden Legacie, 1590, the source text for As You Like It.

Lyly dedicated his second Euphues novel to Edward de Vere, 17th Earl of Oxford, who seems to have acted as patron to most of Lyly's literary associates when they left Oxford for London, and it is about this time that Lyly became his private secretary. De Vere was Burghley's son-in-law, and two years later a letter from Lyly to Burghley, dated July 1582, protests against an accusation of dishonesty which had brought him into trouble with the Earl, and requests a personal interview in order to clear his name. In the same year, he contributed an introductory epistle, John Lyly to the Author his friend, to Thomas Watson's collection of poems Hekatompathia, or passionate Centurie of Love, also published by Cawood, and which Watson also dedicated to de Vere.

In 1583, de Vere secured him the lease of the first Blackfriars Playhouse, where Lyly's first two plays, Campaspe and Sapho and Phao were performed by the joint company of the Children of the Chapel and the Children of Paul's known as Oxford's Boys, before their performances at Court in the presence of the Queen at Whitehall Palace. Campaspe was performed there during the Christmas festivities 1583–84, on "New Year's Day at Night", and Sapho during the pre-Lent festivities on the evening of Shrove Tuesday, 3 March 1584. A warrant issued on 12 March ordered that Lyly be paid a total of £20 for the two performances, although it took until 25 November until he finally received the money. In the meantime, Lyly lost control of the theatre around Easter when Sir William More reclaimed the lease, closing it down, and in June, Lyly was briefly jailed in the Fleet Prison for a debt of £9 8s 8d owed to Nicholas Bremers. Patent Rolls show he was quickly released, "for pity's sake", on 10 June, by the intervention the Queen herself.

A letter written on 30 October 1584 from Oxford to Burghley shows that Lyly was still in de Vere's service, and that Lyly was awkwardly positioned in his loyalty to both men, saying "you sent for Amis my man, and yf he wear absent, that Lylle should come unto yow... I mean not to be yowre ward nor yowre chyld ... and scorne to be offered that injurie, to think I am so weak of government as to be ruled by servants". On 24 November Oxford transferred the rental rights of the manor of Bentfield Bury and a nearby wood, both in Stansted Mountfitchet, Essex, to Lyly worth £30 13s 4d a year. Just over a year later, on 3 March 1586, the property's tenants then bought out the rental rights from him for the lump sum of £250.

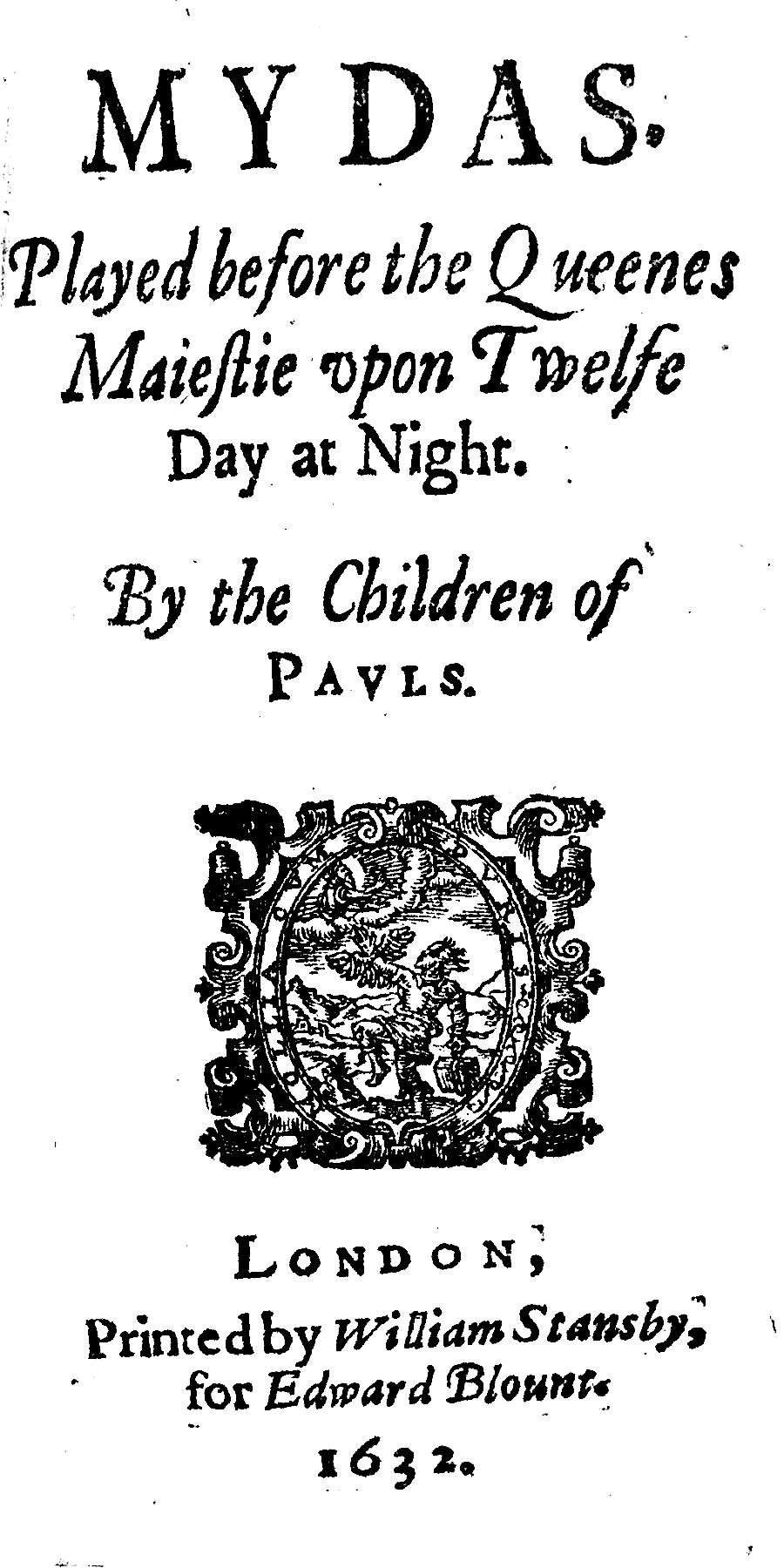
Midas, individual title page in Six Court Comedies (1632)

In 1587 Lyly revived his theatrical career, writing for the Children of Paul's at their playhouse adjacent to St Paul's Cathedral, where his plays would be publicly staged first before their subsequent performance at court. Gallathea was likely performed at Greenwich Palace on "New Year's Day at Night" as part of the 1587/88 Christmas revels there, with Endymion following suit at Candlemas on 2 February 1588. Paul's Boys performed on three dates during the 1589/90 Christmas season at Richmond Palace, on Sunday after Christmas Day, New Year's Day, and Twelfth Day, according to the Council Registers records of payment made for them. The last of these three, 6 Jan 1590, must have been the occasion for Midas since its title page states it was "played... upon Twelfth Day at Night", and this was the only time the company is recorded playing that date. Both Mother Bombie and Love's Metamorphosis must also date from this period 1588–91, each with title pages stating their performance by Paul's Boys, although neither mentions performance before the Queen. After the closure of Paul's Playhouse sometime 1590–91, the latter was subsequently revived for performance at the second Blackfriars Theatre in 1600–01, this time, as its title page states, by the Children of the Chapel. An eighth play by Lyly, The Woman in the Moon, his only play in verse and first published in 1597, also declares its royal performance but is the only one that does not state the name of the company who performed it. In total, at least six of Lyly's eight known surviving plays were performed before the Queen.

In 1589 Lyly published a tract in the Martin Marprelate controversy, called Pappe with an hatchet, alias a figge for my Godsonne; Or Crack me this nut; Or a Countrie Cuffe, etc. Though published anonymously, the evidence for his authorship of the tract may be found in Gabriel Harvey's Pierce's Supererogation (written November 1589, published 1593), in Thomas Nashe's Have with You to Saffron-Walden (1596), and in various allusions in Lyly's own plays.

=== Parliamentarian and courtier ===
Lyly sat as an MP in Queen Elizabeth's last four Parliaments, for Hindon in Wiltshire in 1589, for Aylesbury in Buckinghamshire twice, in 1593 and 1601, and for Appleby in Westmorland in 1597–98 when he also served on a parliamentary committee about wine casks.

In 1594 Lyly was made an honorary member of Gray's Inn in order to attend the lawyers' Christmas Revels, during which, on 28 December, William Shakespeare's company famously performed their Comedy of Errors. In 1597 Lyly contributed commendatory verses in Latin to Henry Lok's verse translation of the book of Ecclesiastes, which Lok dedicated to the Queen.

In addition to plays, Lyly also composed at least one "entertainment" (a show that combined elements of masque and drama) performed for Queen Elizabeth during her various Progresses through the country; The Entertainment at Chiswick was staged on 28 and 29 July 1602 at the house of Sir William Russell. Lyly has been suggested as the author of several other royal entertainments of the 1590s, most notably The Entertainment at Mitcham performed on 13 September 1598 at the house of Sir Julius Caesar.

Two petitions by Lyly to Queen Elizabeth show that he entered her service at some time in the late 1580s, with hopes of becoming her Master of the Revels, hopes that eventually ended in disappointment. In the first petition he says that:

I was entertained your Majestie's servaunt by your own gratious favor ... strengthened with condicions that I should ayme all my courses at the Revells (I dare not say with a promise, but with a hopeful Item to the Revercion) for which these ten yeres I have attended with an unwearyed patience

In the second petition, dated 1601, Lyly complains:

Thirteen yeres your highnes servant but yet nothing. Twenty friends that though they saye they will be sure, I finde them sure to be slowe. A thousand hopes, but all nothing; a hundred promises but yet nothing. Thus casting up the inventory of my friends, hopes, promises and tymes, the summa totalis amounteth to just nothing

The originals of the two petitions do not survive, but, whatever their success with Elizabeth, after Lyly's death the pair enjoyed the most extensive circulation in manuscript of any Elizabethan-Jacobean dramatist. Forty-six copies of the two letters in post-1620 manuscript miscellanies, anthologies of state correspondence, and letter-manuals, can currently be recorded.

A third, now lost, petition is mentioned in a letter to Sir Robert Cecil, Elizabeth's Principal Secretary, dated 4 Feb 1602, where Lyly tells him that:

My wife delivered my petition to the Queen, who accepted it graciously, & as I desired referred it to Mr Grevil ... The copy I have sent enclosed, not to trouble your Honour, but only to vouchsafe a view of the particulars, all woven in one, is but to have something

What he did in fact receive, if anything, as a result of this third petition is unknown. At Elizabeth's death a year later in March 1603, Lyly was granted seven yards of black cloth for her funeral, and his servants four yards.

Lyly died of unknown causes in 1606, in the early part of the reign of James I, and was buried on 30 November in the church of St Bartholomew-the-Less in London. He was married to Beatrice Browne of Yorkshire, and they had at least four sons and five daughters.

The proverb "All is fair in love and war" has been attributed to Lyly's Euphues.

== Plays ==
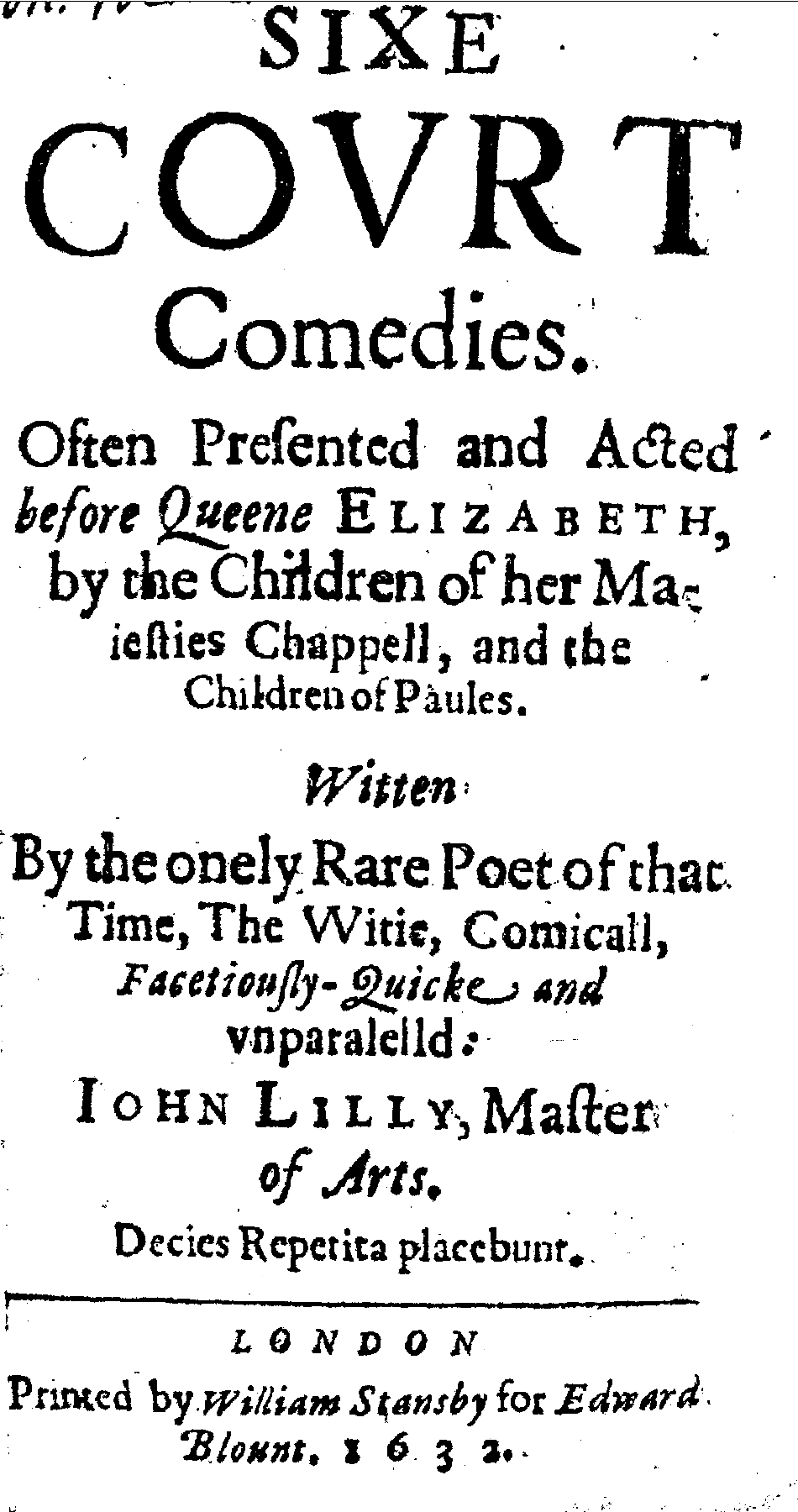
Six Court Comedies (1632) title page

Although the two volumes of Euphues were Lyly's most popular and influential works in the Elizabethan period, it is his plays which are now admired most, for their flexible use of dramatic prose and the elegant patterning of their construction.

Eight of Lyly's plays survive in quarto, published during his lifetime in fourteen separate editions, all but the last written in prose:

- Campaspe performed 1583/84 (printed 1584 three times, & 1591)
- Sapho and Phao performed 1584 (printed 1584 twice, & 1591)
- Gallathea performed 1587/88 (printed 1592)
- Endymion, the Man in the Moon performed 1588 (printed 1591)
- Midas performed 1589/90 (printed 1592)
- Mother Bombie performed c. 1590 (printed 1594, & 1598)
- Love's Metamorphosis performed c. 1589/90, revived 1600/01 (printed 1601)
- The Woman in the Moon probably performed 1590–95 (printed 1597)

While A Warning for Fair Women (1599) and The Maid's Metamorphosis (1600) have been attributed to Lyly in the past, these attributions have not gained any serious acceptance.

Six Court Comedies, the first printed collection of Lyly's plays, was published in duodecimo format by Edward Blount in 1632, the same year that he published the Second Folio of Shakespeare's plays. They appear in the volume in the following order: Endymion, Campaspe, Sapho and Phao, Gallathea, Midas and Mother Bombie, all first printed 1584–94. The last two of his plays to be published, The Woman in the Moon and Love's Metamorphosis, printed in 1597 & 1601 respectively, were omitted. The collection printed the songs in Campaspe and Gallathea for the first time.

In his introduction to the plays, 'To the Reader', Blount explained his motivation for publication:

I have (for the love I beare to Posteritie) dig'd up the Grave of a Rare and Excellent Poet, whom Queene Elizabeth then heard, Graced, and Rewarded ... A sinne it were to suffer these Rare Monuments of wit, to lye covered in Dust, and a shame such conceipted Comedies, should be Acted by none but wormes. Oblivion shall not so trample on a sonne of the Muses; And such a sonne, as they called their Darling.

He ended his address with:

These his plays Crown'd him with applause, and the Spectators with pleasure. Thou canst not repent the Reading of them over: when Old John Lilly, is merry with thee in thy Chamber, Thou shalt say, Few (or None) of our Poets now are such witty Companions : And thanke mee, that brings him to thy Acquaintance.

Blount dedicated the collection to Richard, 1st Viscount Lumley of Waterford, writing:

It can be no dishonor, to listen to this Poets Music, whose Tunes alighted in the Ears of a great and ever-famous Queene: his Invention was so curiously strung, that Elizaes Court held his notes in Admiration ... For this Poet sat at the Sunnes Table : Apollo gave him a wreath of his own Bayes, without snatching. The Lyre he played on, had no borrowed strings ... The greatest treasure our Poet left behind him, are these six ingots of refined invention: richer than Gold. Were they Diamonds they are now yours.

Francis Meres placed "eloquent and witty John Lyly" alongside Shakespeare in his list of "the best for comedy amongst us" when describing the playwrights of his day in his Palladis Tamia, or Wits Treasury, printed in 1598. Ben Jonson, in his poem "To the Memory of My Beloved, the Author, Mr William Shakespeare" printed in the 1623 First Folio, praised Lyly by listing him as one of the best playwrights whom Shakespeare surpassed: "How far thou didst our Lyly outshine, Or sporting Kyd, or Marlowe's mighty line".

Lyly's importance as a dramatist has been very differently estimated, but his dialogue was a great advance in anything that had gone before it, and his nimbleness and wit represents an important step in English dramatic art. Shakespeare's comedies Love's Labour's Lost, A Midsummer Night's Dream, Much Ado About Nothing, As You Like It and Twelfth Night are all seen to have drawn influence from Lyly's work.

== Sources ==
- Beal, Peter. Catalogue of English Literary Manuscripts 1450–1700, Retrieved 22 April 2021.
- Bevington, David (2000). Galatea & Midas (282 pp.). The Revels Plays, Manchester University Press.
- Bond, R. W. (1902; reprinted 1967). The Complete Works of John Lyly. 3 Vols. Oxford University Press.
- Drabble, Margaret (ed.) (2000).The Oxford Companion to English Literature. 6th edition, Oxford University Press. p. 618.
- Feuillerat, Albert (1910). John Lyly: Contribution a l'Histoire de la Renaissance en Angleterre. Cambridge University Press.
- Hunter, G. K. (1962). John Lyly: The Humanist as Courtier (376 pp.). Harvard University Press.
- Hunter, G. K. (2004). "Lyly, John (1554–1606)". Oxford Dictionary of National Biography. Oxford University Press. Retrieved 23 January 2012.
- Logan, Terence P., and Denzell S. Smith, eds. (1973). The Predecessors of Shakespeare: A Survey and Bibliography of Recent Studies in English Renaissance Drama. Lincoln, NE, University of Nebraska Press.
- Lyly, John (1632). Six Court Comedies. Edward Blount, London.
- Scragg, Leah (2003). Euphues: The Anatomy of Wit, and Euphues and His England (358 pp.). Revels Plays Companion Library, Manchester University Press.
- Urry, William (1960). John Lyly and Canterbury, 33rd Annual Report of the Friends of Canterbury Cathedral.
- Wiggins, Martin (2012). British Drama 1533–1642: A Catalogue, Vol. II: 1567–1589. Oxford University Press.
- Wilson, John Dover (1905). John Lyly (140 pp.). Macmillan and Bowes.
