= Euphues: The Anatomy of Wit =

1578 prose romance by John Lyly

Euphues
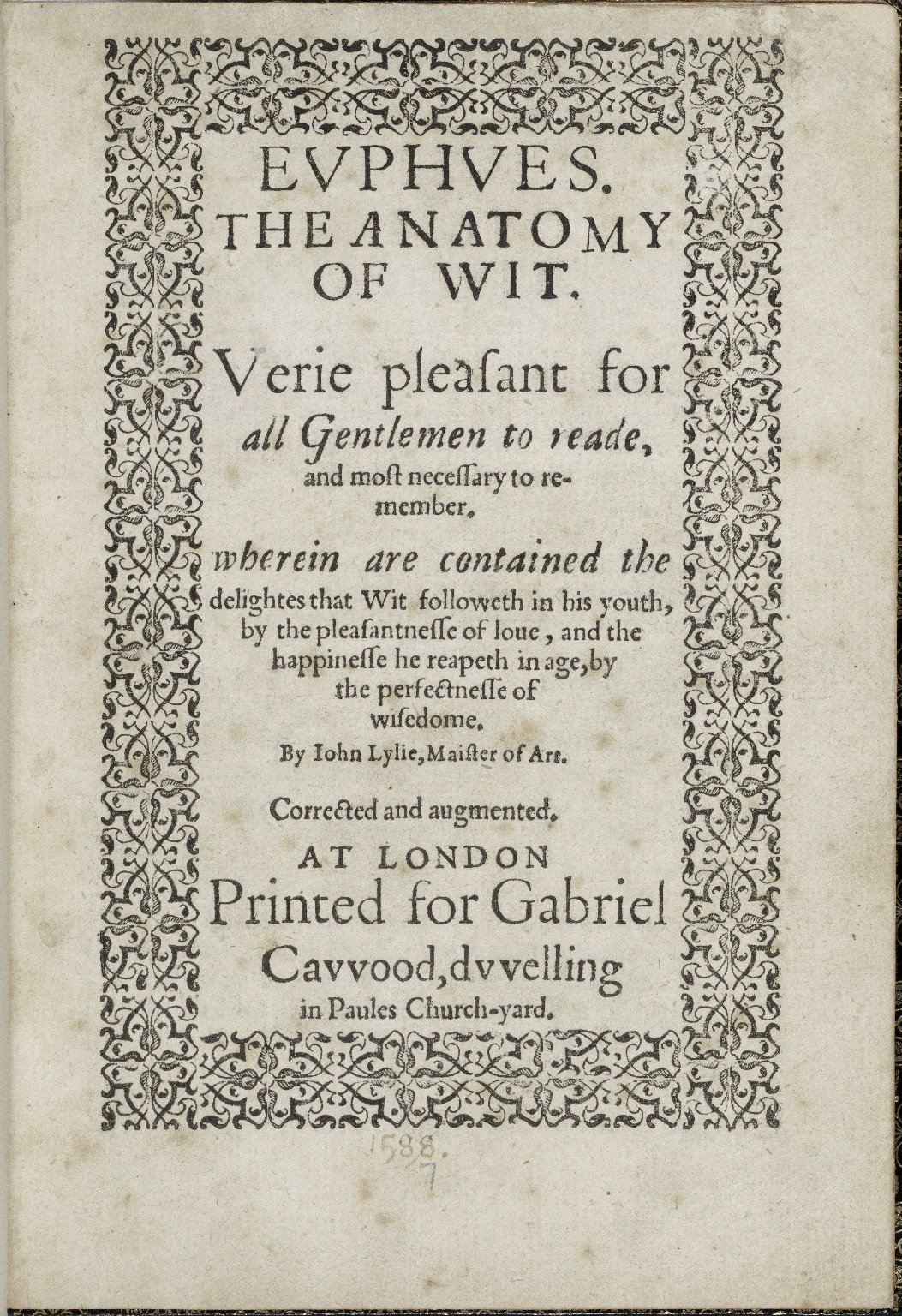
- Title page of Euphues, c. 1578.
- Author: John Lyly
- Language: Early Modern English
- Genre: Romance
- Publication date: 2 December 1578
- Publication place: England
- Dewey Decimal: 823.2
- LC Class: PR2302 .E8

Euphues: The Anatomy of Wit /ˈjuːfjuːiːz/, is a didactic romance written by John Lyly. It was entered in the Stationers' Register on the 2nd December 1578 and published that same year.

It was followed by Euphues and his England, registered on 25 July 1579, but not published until Spring of 1580.

The name Euphues is derived from Greek ευφυής (euphuēs) meaning "graceful, witty."

Lyly adopted the name from Roger Ascham's The Scholemaster, which describes Euphues as a type of student who is "apte by goodness of witte, and appliable by readiness of will, to learning, hauving all other qualities of the mind and parts of the body, that must an other day serue learning, not troubled, mangled, and halfed, but sound, whole, full & able to do their office" (194). Lyly's mannered style is characterized by parallel arrangements and periphrases.

The style of these novels gave rise to the term euphuism. The proverb "All is fair in love and war" has been attributed to Lyly's Euphues.

== Literary references ==
There have been literary references to Euphues as follows:

- Thomas Lodge Jr made reference to the name in Rosalynde: Euphues Golden Legacy, Found After His Death In His Cell At Silexedra which is the source book for William Shakespeare's play As You Like It
- Robert Greene made reference to the name in Menaphon : Camillas alarum to slumbering Euphues, in his melancholie cell at Silexedra (1589)
- Thomas Carlyle made reference to the character in his essay of social criticism, Signs of the Times (1829).
- Virginia Woolf made reference to the name in The Voyage Out (1915) as "The germ of the English Novel".
