= Children of Paul's =

Troupe of boy actors in Elizabethan and Jacobean London

The Children of Paul's was the name of a troupe of boy actors in Elizabethan and Jacobean London. Along with the Children of the Chapel, they were an important component of the companies of boy players that constituted a distinctive feature of English Renaissance theatre.

== Education ==
The youth who would become choirboys and boy players for the Children of Paul's ranged in age from six to their mid-teens. They would be educated and boarded at the choir school, trained in not only singing but in grammar and literacy. Although their basic needs were taken care of, choirboys sometimes made some money for themselves. When fashionably dressed men wearing spurs, which could be loud and distracting to other church-goers, would enter the chapel, the choirboys would sometimes demand money as a fee. This fee was called "spur money". Choirboys were allowed time to play on Thursday afternoons, and in one document from 1598, a verger named John Howe notes an occasion when the boys broke windows and disrupted churchgoers.

== The early years ==
St Paul's Cathedral in London had a boys' choir since the 12th century; it was only in the 16th century that they began to act in dramatic performances. Playing may have become a part of the boys' education as a result of the influence of humanist teachings, which encouraged students to "develop poise and improve their skill in speaking Latin by acting"

In 1527–1528, the Children of Paul's performed for King Henry VIII, and for Cardinal Thomas Wolsey.

Sebastian Westcott was Master of the Children of Paul's in the years 1557–82; in his era, the boys performed 27 times at court, more than any other troupe, adult or child. In 1560–1572 Master of the Revels Sir Thomas Benger used them throughout his tenure, as later mentioned in William Shakespeare' play Hamlet, Act 2 Scene 2. One example is when the company performed for Queen Elizabeth and her guest at the time, Cecilia of Sweden, in 1566. They performed a play by Sixt Birk, called Sapientia Solomonis, which "dramatized the relationship between King Solomon and the Queen of Sheba in a way appropriate for schoolboys". Under Master Thomas Giles (1584–1599?), the Children of Paul's became closely identified with the plays of John Lyly; they performed at Court nine times in the years 1587–90. The boys acted Lyly's Gallathea at Court, probably on 1 January 1588; they acted his Endymion at Court a month and a day later, on 2 February; and his Midas on 6 January 1590. Other of Lyly's plays, Mother Bombie and Love's Metamorphosis, were also presented at Court in these years.

Also in the 1580s the Children of Paul's joined the Children of the Chapel in public performances at the first Blackfriars Theatre (1583–1584), a foretaste of the period of public performance that was to follow for both companies at the start of the 17th century.

In 1590, the Children of Paul's were implicated in the Martin Marprelate controversy, as not only were they associated with John Lyly, they had "helped to publicise his contributions". All theatre companies, including adult ones, were forced to curb their productions. Boy companies became scarce until the Children of Paul's returned a decade later in 1599–1600. By the time of its reopening, the Children of Paul's may have had up to 17 boy players (84 Roslyn Lander Knutson). For the next ten years the boy companies were out of fashion on the stage.

== The later years ==
By 1600, conditions had changed; a new Master, Edward Peers (died 1612), allowed the Children of Paul's to resume acting, and apparently faced no significant opposition. The company operated on a smaller scale than before, though only playing on Sundays and Mondays and charging half the amount for the attendance fee than they had in 1590. The anonymous plays The Maid's Metamorphosis and The Wisdom of Doctor Dodypoll illustrate the kind of drama the boys acted in their first year. The Children of Paul's performed the works of John Marston, George Chapman, and Thomas Middleton, among other dramatists of their generation. Marston was mainly identified with the Children of Paul's, as Jonson was identified with the Children of the Chapel; in the Poetomachia, the War of the Theatres of 1599–1601, the Children of Paul's acted Marston's side of the contest, with the plays Jack Drum's Entertainment (1600) and What You Will (1601), plus Thomas Dekker's Satiromastix (1601).

However, unlike the Children of the Chapel, who worked in the second Blackfriars Theatre, the Children of Paul's had no dedicated theatrical space of their own. When they were not playing at Court, they acted in the church where they trained as choristers – St Gregory by St Paul's Church, just to the south-west of St Paul's Cathedral. This tended to limit their drama; sometimes plays had to be cut short to accommodate the schedules of the religious institutions in the middle of which the boy players operated.

In 1603, the Children of Paul’s performed the controversial play by George Chapman: The Old Joiner Of Aldgate. This is a lost play considered to be a dramatised representation of the legal wrangling in the Star Chamber of one John Flaskett (a local book binder) and a woman of considerable inheritance he was betrothed to: Agnes How. This controversy cannot have helped in the Children of Paul’s attempts to continue performing.

The Children of Paul's ceased playing about 1606 for unclear reasons. Some scholars have believed that the King's Revels Children, another company that formed c. 1606, might have been to some degree the Children of Paul's under another name, but this is uncertain. (The King's Revels Children never gelled as an enterprise; they collapsed in litigation among their backers in 1609.)

However it could also be that the company simply merged with the Children of the Blackfriars, rather than disappearing altogether.
