= Sapho and Phao =

Elizabethan era stage play

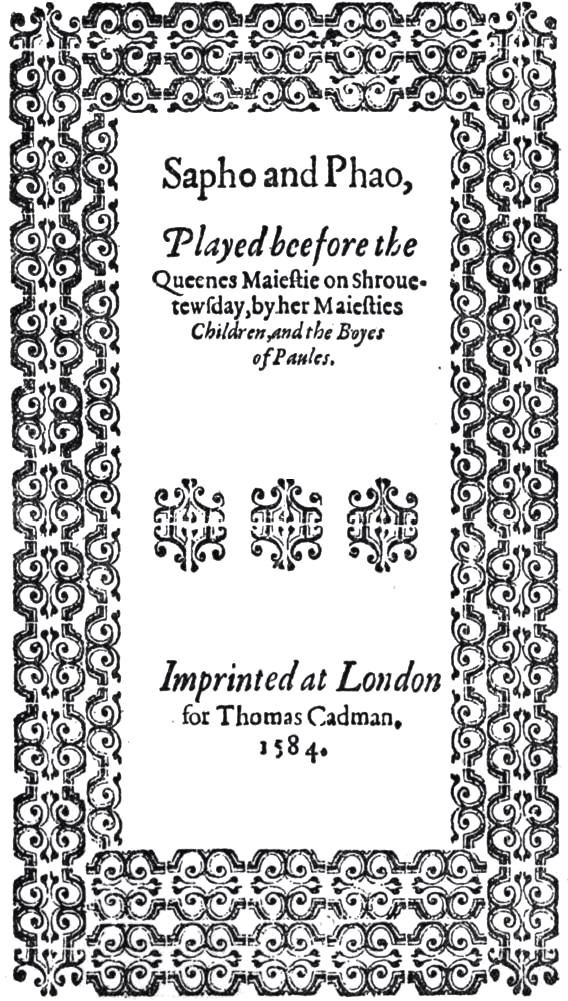
Title page of Sapho and Phao (1584)

Sapho and Phao is an Elizabethan era stage play, a comedy written by John Lyly. One of Lyly's earliest dramas, it was likely the first that the playwright devoted to the allegorical idealisation of Queen Elizabeth I that became the predominating feature of Lyly's dramatic canon.

== Performance and publication ==
Sapho and Phao is known to have been performed at Court before Queen Elizabeth, probably on 3 March 1584; it was also staged at the first Blackfriars Theatre. In these respects it resembles Campaspe, Lyly's other early play; and like Campaspe, sources conflict on the identity of the acting company that performed the work. Court records credit "Oxford's boys," while the title page of the play's first edition specifies the Children of Paul's, Lyly's regular company, and the Children of the Chapel. The evidence, taken as a whole, may indicate that both plays, Campaspe and Sapho and Phao, were acted by a combination of personnel from three troupes of boy actors—those of Paul's and the Chapel and the young company that the Earl of Oxford maintained in the 1580s.

Sapho was entered into the Stationers' Register on 6 April 1584 and was first published that year in a quarto edition printed by Thomas Dawson for the bookseller Thomas Cadman—the same men who were responsible for Q1 of Campaspe, also in 1584. And again like Campaspe, the first edition of Sapho was released in more than one "state" or impression: the two impression of the 1584 Sapho are sometimes defined as two separate quartos.

Another distinct quarto edition was issued in 1591, printed by Thomas Orwin for William Broome. The play was also included in Six Court Comedies, the initial collection of Lyly's plays published by Edward Blount in 1632.

== Sources ==
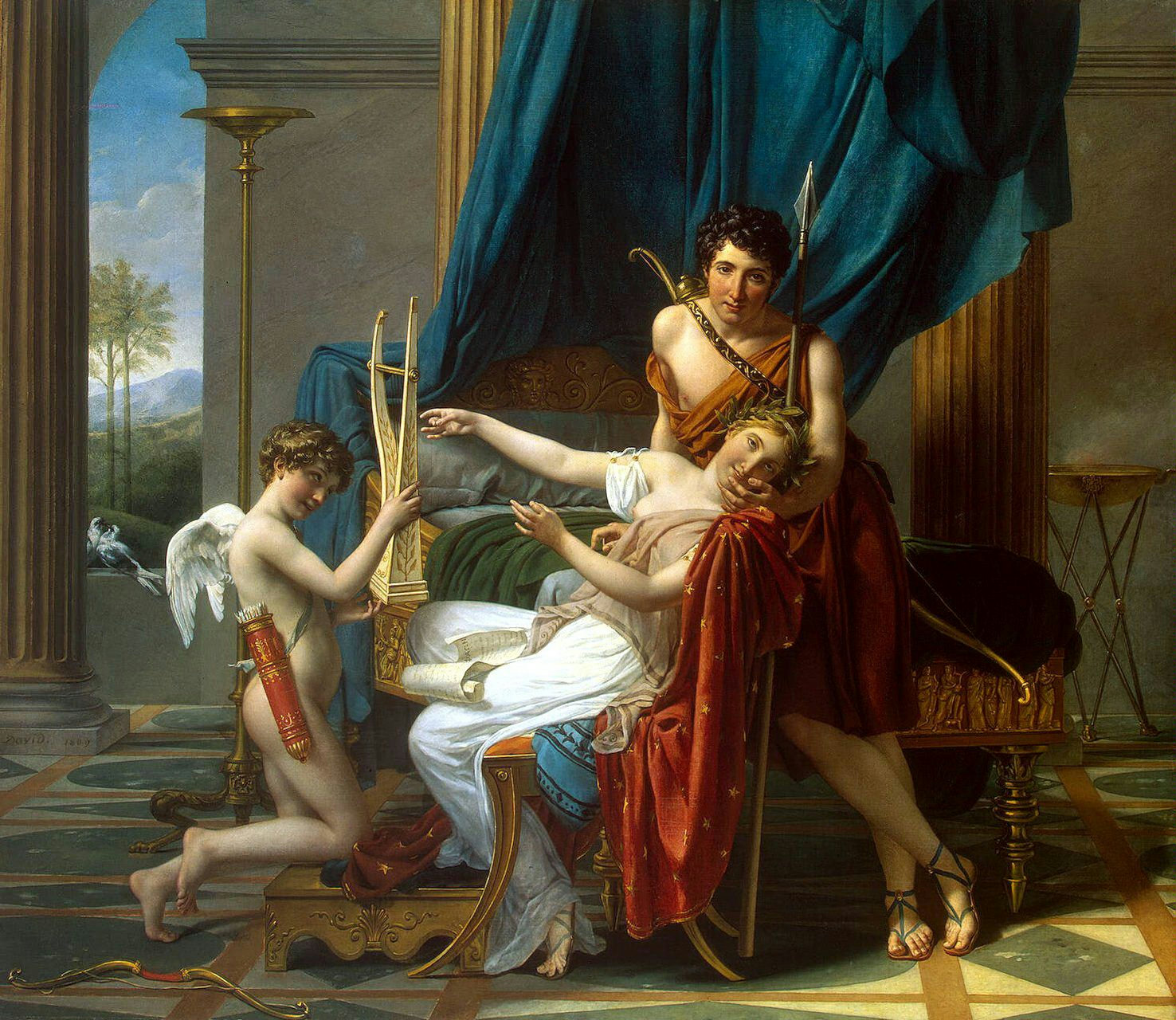
Sappho and Phaon. A Jacques-Louis David painting from the Moika Palace in Saint Petersburg

Lyly dramatised the ancient Greek legend of the romance of Sappho and Phaon, drawing on Ovid's "Letter from Sappho to Phaon", from the Heroides, and Aelian's Varia Historia (translated into English by Abraham Fleming in 1576).

== Synopsis ==
The play is set in Syracuse and the surrounding countryside. Venus, on her way to Syracuse to humble the pride of Queen Sapho, endows a young ferryman named Phao with great beauty. (In some of the myths, Phaon is an old ferryman of Lesbos who is rewarded by Aphrodite with renewed youth and beauty after he transports her from Mytilene to Chios.) The beautiful waiting women of Sapho's court learn of Phao, flirt with and court him; but he is disdainful of them. When Sapho catches sight of Phao she instantly falls in love with him; and Phao in turn is love-struck with her. Sapho hides her infatuation by pretending to be fever-stricken, and sends for Phao, since he reportedly possesses febrifugic herbs. They share a mutual passion, but the enormous gap between their social positions is an insuperable barrier.

Through an accident with Cupid's arrows, Venus herself falls in love with Phao. She has her husband Vulcan (his forge is under Mount Etna) mould new arrows to break love spells; she turns for help to her son Cupid, who in Lyly's hands foreshadows the later Puck in Shakespeare's A Midsummer Night's Dream. Cupid performs part of his mother's will, in that he cures Sapho of her love of Phao; but then Cupid succumbs to the queen's charms. The pranksterish god not only fails to make Phao love Venus, but actually inspires him with a revulsion for her.

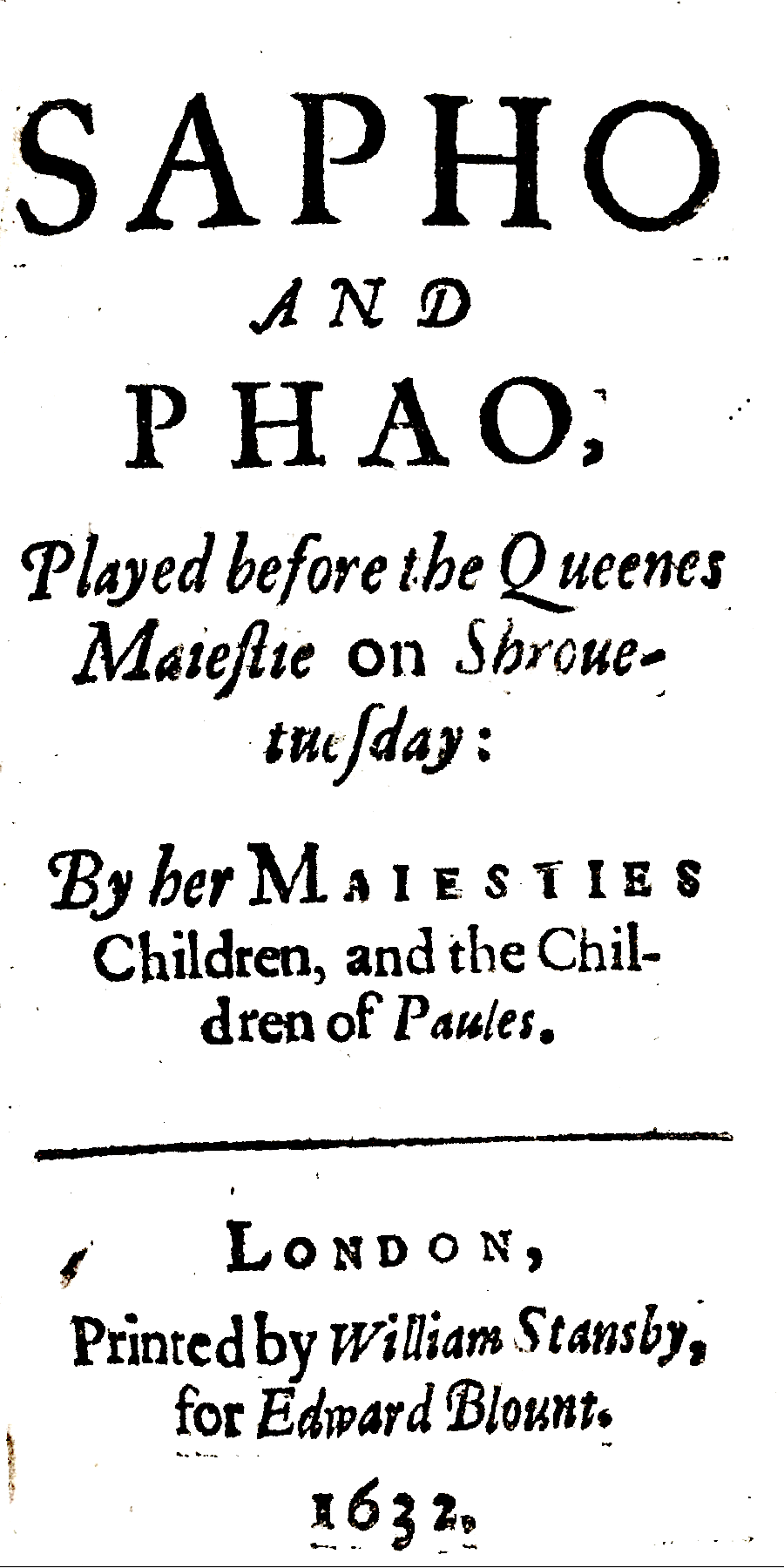
Sapho and Phao, individual title page in Six Court Comedies (1632)

The play concludes with Phao leaving Sicily; Cupid rebels against his mother's will and remains with Sapho, adopting her as his new mother.

Variety and comic relief are provided by the talk of Sapho's ladies in waiting, by the "Sybilla" whom Phao consults for advice and guidance, and of course by the witty pages who recur so regularly in Lyly's dramas.

== Allegory ==
Lyly shaped his version of the Sapho and Phao story to form an allegory of contemporaneous events and circumstances at the English royal court; the Prologues published with the 1584 quarto refer to this "necessity of the history." Sapho is made a great queen so that she can represent Elizabeth; traditionally, Phao is thought to stand for François, Duke of Anjou, the man the Elizabethans called the Duke of Alençon. The Duke courted Elizabeth up to 1582, but finally gave up the effort and left England romantically disappointed, as Phao leaves Sicily. Sapho ends the play with a kind of divine love, or idealised love—but no human lover; she is another type of virgin queen.

One writer went so far as to claim that this interpretation had not "been questioned by any sane critic." Perhaps inevitably, some later commentators have disputed this standard interpretation.
