= Stationers' Register =

Record book of the Stationers' Company of London

Stationers' Company Register
- Language: English
- Genre: Record book
- Published: 1556–1924
- Publisher: The Stationers' Company
- Publication place: Kingdom of England

The Stationers' Register was a record book maintained by the Stationers' Company of London. This was a trade guild given a royal charter in 1557 to regulate the various professions associated with England's publishing industry, including printers, bookbinders, booksellers, and publishers. The company's charter gave it the right to seize illicit editions of published works and to bar the publication of unlicensed books, and allowed publishers to document their right to produce a particular printed work in the register, which thus constituted an early form of copyright law.

For the study of English literature of the later 16th and the 17th centuries (covering the Elizabethan, Jacobean, and Caroline eras), and especially for English Renaissance theatre, the Stationers' Register is an essential resource: it provides factual information and data that is available nowhere else. Together with the records of the Master of the Revels (which relate to dramatic performance rather than publication), the Stationers' Register supplies many of the certain facts scholars possess on the works of William Shakespeare, Ben Jonson, and all of their immediate predecessors, contemporaries, and successors. It is also an critical source of information about ephemeral publications, such as popular broadside ballads, of which no printed copies survive.

By paying a fee of four to six pence, a bookseller could register his right to publish a given work. One example: the Stationers' Register reveals that on 26 November 1607, the stationers John Busby and Nathaniel Butter claimed the right to print "A booke called Master William Shakespeare his historye of Kinge Lear, as yt was played before the Kinges maiestie at Whitehall vppon Sainct Stephens night at Christmas Last, by his maiesties servantes playinge vsually at the Globe on the Banksyde." (They paid sixpence.)

Enforcement of regulations in this historical era was never as thorough as in the modern world; books were sometimes published without registration, and other irregularities also occurred. In some cases, the companies of actors appear to have registered plays through co-operative stationers, with the express purpose of forestalling the publication of a play when publication was not in their interest.

Because every book published in early modern England was recorded in the Stationers' Register, it is possible to see the circulation of books in early modern England. Every book which was registered with the Stationers' Company was "freely given" by the guild to Oxford University's Bodleian Library in a "Deed of Grant." This was mutually beneficial because it allowed members of the Stationers Guild to access the library.

In 1710, the Copyright Act or Statute of Anne entered into force, superseding company provisions pertaining to the Register. The company continued to offer some form of registration of works until February 2000.

== Sources ==
- Arber, Edward, ed. A Transcript of the Registers of the Company of Stationers of London 1554–1640 A.D. 5 Volumes, London, privately printed, 1875–94. Reprinted New York, P. Smith, 1950.
- Chambers, E. K. The Elizabethan Stage. 4 Volumes, Oxford, Clarendon Press, 1923.
- Eyre, G. E. B., and G. R. Rivington, eds. A Transcript of the Registers of the Worshipful Company of Stationers from 1640–1708. 3 Volumes, London, privately printed, 1913–14.
- Greg, W. W., and E. Boswell, eds. Records of the Court of the Stationers' Company, 1576 to 1602. London, The Bibliographical Society, 1930.
- Halliday, F. E. A Shakespeare Companion 1564–1964. Baltimore, Penguin, 1964.
- Jackson, William A., ed. Records of the Court of the Stationers' Company 1602 to 1640. London, The Bibliographical Society, 1957.
- Rollins, H. E. An Analytical Index to the Ballad-Entries (1557–1709) in the Registers of the Company of Stationers of London. University of North Carolina Press, 1924.
