= Thomas Savage =

Thomas or Tom Savage may refer to:

- Thomas Savage (bishop) (1449–1507), Archbishop of York
- Thomas Savage (Shakespeare's trustee) (c. 1552–1611), goldsmith and seacoal-meter in London
- Thomas Savage, 1st Viscount Savage (c. 1586–1635), also known as Sir Thomas Savage, 2nd Baronet between 1615 and 1626
- Thomas Savage (Virginia interpreter) (c. 1594–1633), early English colonist in Virginia
- Thomas Savage (major) (1608–1682), English soldier and New England colonist and merchant
- Thomas Savage, 3rd Earl Rivers (1628–1694), English peer
- Thomas Savage (Quebec politician) (1808–1887), merchant, shipowner and politician in the province of Quebec, Canada
- Thomas S. Savage (1804–1880), American Protestant clergyman, missionary, physician and naturalist
- Thomas Savage (historian) (born 1823), copyist and oral historian for Hubert Howe Bancroft
- Thomas Savage (novelist) (1915–2003), American author
- Thomas R. Savage, American insurance executive
- Tom Savage (1800s), criminal in Los Angeles
- Tom Savage (bishop) (1900–1966), Anglican bishop
- Tom Savage (painter) (born 1953), American painter
- Tom Savage (social entrepreneur) (born 1979), social entrepreneur
- Tom Savage (rugby union) (born 1989), rugby union player Moana Pasifika
- Tom Savage (American football) (born 1990), American football quarterback
- Tom Savage (Irish media figure) (c. 1940–2017), chairman of the RTÉ Board
- Tom Savage (poet) (born 1948), American poet
