= Joan Leche =

Benefactress

- Born: c. 1450
- Died: March 1530 (aged 79–80)
- Spouses: Thomas Bodley; Thomas Bradbury
- Issue: James Bodley; John Bodley; Denise Bodley; Elizabeth Bodley
- Father: Denis Leche
- Mother: Elizabeth (surname unknown)

Joan Leche (c. 1450 – March 1530), benefactress, was the wife successively of Thomas Bodley, and of Thomas Bradbury, Lord Mayor of London in 1509. She founded a chantry in London, and a grammar school in Saffron Walden, Essex. Her great-grandson, Sir John Leveson (1555–1615), was instrumental in putting down the Essex in 1601, and her great-grandson William Leveson (d. 1621) acted as trustee for the original shareholders of the Globe Theatre.

== Family ==
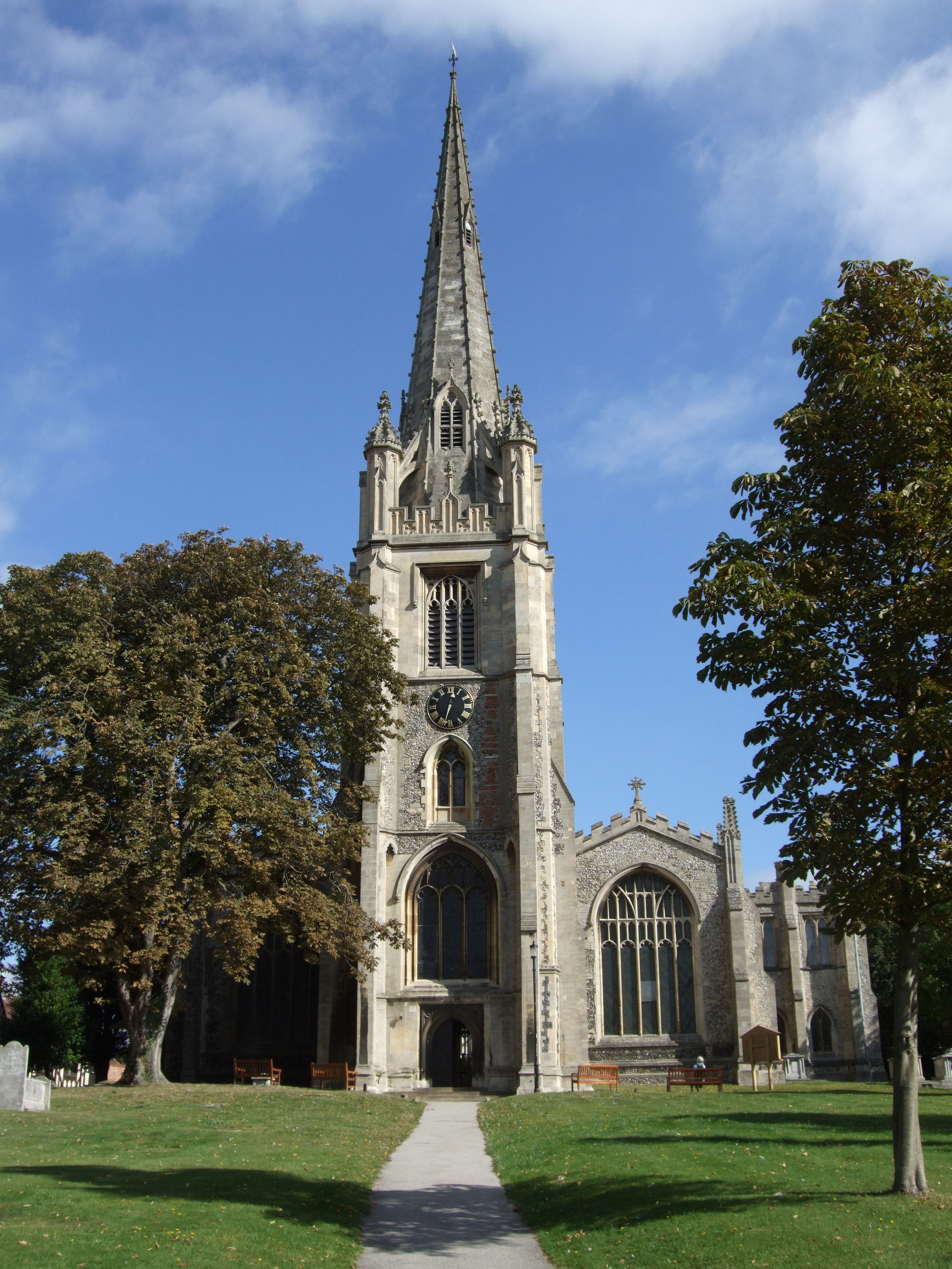
St Mary's Church, Saffron Waldon.

Joan Leche, born about 1450, was the daughter of Denis Leche of Wellingborough, Northamptonshire, and his wife Elizabeth, whose surname is unknown. She had three brothers whose names are known, Henry, Thomas and John. John entered the priesthood, and became vicar of Saffron Walden, Essex, from 1489 until his death on 8 November 1521.

== First marriage ==
At some time between 1470 and 1475 Joan Leche married Thomas Bodley, citizen and Merchant Taylor of London. Of Devonshire origins, Thomas and his brother Richard, Grocer, and their families lived in the parish of St Botolph Billingsgate. Richard died in 1491, and Thomas in 1492, both leaving young children.

They were of the same family as Sir Thomas Bodley (founder of the Bodleian Library), and bore the same coat of arms: 'Gules, five martlets argent on a chief indented or three crowns azure'. The precise connection has not been identified.

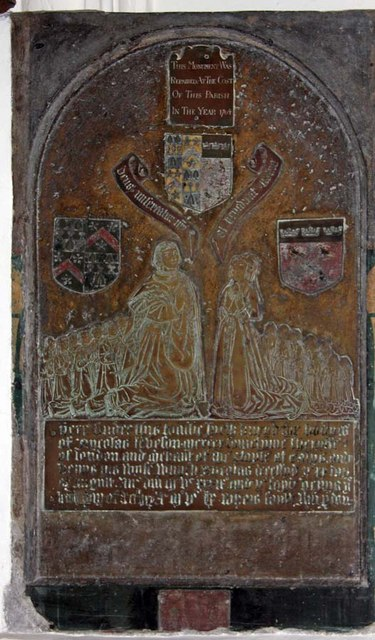
Brass (1539) to Nicholas Leveson and wife Dionysia Bodley: St Andrew Undershaft, London.

Children

Joan's children were all of her first marriage, and were as follows:

- James Bodley (d.1514). He became a mercer in Saffron Walden, and married Joan, daughter of Thomas Strachey of Saffron Walden and his wife Joan. They had two sons and a daughter.
- John Bodley (d. by 1522). He became a Benedictine monk at St Albans.
- Elizabeth Bodley (d. between 1526 and 1530). She married William Tyrrell of South Ockendon, Essex. They had two sons, Humphrey Tyrrell (d.1549) and another who died without issue, and two daughters, Elizabeth and Anne.
- Dionysia Bodley (d.1561), the youngest daughter. She married the citizen and Mercer Nicholas Leveson (d.1539), second son of Richard Leveson Esquire of Prestwood, Staffordshire (d.1503) by his wife Jane Bradbury. (Leveson and his younger brother James (d. 1547) were leading merchants of London and Wolverhampton.) They had eight sons and ten daughters, including at least three sets of twins. Of these,
  - John Leveson, eldest son, was killed in Kett's Rebellion.
  - Thomas Leveson (1532-1576), second son, married Ursula Gresham (1534-1574), daughter of Sir John Gresham (c.1495–1556), Lord Mayor. Of their children,
    - Sir John Leveson (1555–1615) was instrumental in putting down the Essex rebellion of 8 February 1601
    - William Leveson (d.1621) was one of two trustees used by William Kempe, Thomas Pope, Augustine Phillips, John Heminges and William Shakespeare (1564-1616) to allocate shareholdings in the Globe Theatre in 1599.

Thomas Bodley left an estate of £1000, of which his wife, Joan, was entitled to a third, and his children another third, according to the custom of the City of London. Sutton considers it likely that she continued to run her late husband's business.

== Second marriage ==
About March 1495 Joan Leche remarried. Her second husband, Thomas Bradbury (c.1439 – 10 January 1510), was in his mid-fifties, and she herself was in her forties. The Bradbury family had come from Ollersett, Derbyshire, to Braughing, Hertfordshire, and then moved to Littlebury, Essex, near Saffron Walden, where Joan's brother was vicar. Bradbury was one of four brothers, and had not been married before. He was a well-off London mercer and Merchant Adventurer, and at the time of the marriage took on her son James Bodley as an apprentice.

After the marriage the family lived in the parish of St Stephen Coleman Street, and Bradbury embarked on a public career which he appears to have avoided during his bachelorhood. He was elected to Parliament in 1495, served as warden of the Mercers in 1496, and was one of the Sheriffs of London in 1498. In 1502 he was Master of the Mercers' Company, and an alderman of the City of London. Barron and Sutton attribute Bradbury's involvement in public office and in the affairs of his company at this period to his wife's influence and to the likelihood that she was able to 'take full charge of his business in his absence', enabling him to devote time to these other pursuits. In 1509 he was elected Lord Mayor, but his term in office was brief. He made his will on 9 January 1510, requesting burial in the chapel of the parish church in St Stephen Coleman Street, and died on the following day. His passing was noted in Arnold's Chronicle. There had been no issue of his marriage, and Thomas Bradbury's heir was his nephew, William Bradbury (d. 1550) of Littlebury, son of his eldest brother, Robert Bradbury.

Thomas Bradbury left to his widow a mansion in Catte Street in London and several manors and annuities, as well as the residue of his estate. This included his mercery business, which she appears to have sold after her son James Bodley, a mercer, died in 1514. James appointed his mother overseer of his will, in consideration of which he left her a pound of saffron.

== Later life and endowments ==
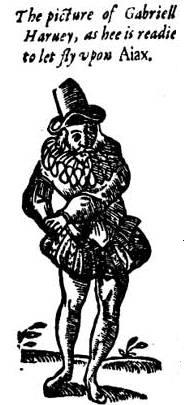
Nashe's caricature of Gabriel Harvey, who attended the Saffron Walden school

After Bradbury's death his widow endowed a perpetual chantry in the church of St Stephen Coleman Street for the souls of both her husbands. This involved the purchase of lands from which the revenues would fund the chantry in perpetuity. Within a year of Thomas Bradbury's death his widow had purchased the necessary lands, and had agreed to give the Mercers' Company her mansion in Catte Street to use as their Company Hall in return for their agreement to act as trustees. In 1511 the Mercers held their annual banquet at her mansion at her request, noting that it would be more 'chargeable' than was usually the case, because of the 'Company of Gentilwemen that she myndeth to have'. This innovation of having wives present at the Mercers' annual banquet persisted for some years, at least until 1525.

Saffron Walden

In 1513 Lady Bradbury, her brother John Leche, vicar of Saffron Walden, and her son, James Bodley, were involved in obtaining a form of self-government for the town of Saffron Walden through the founding of the Guild of the Holy Trinity, and Lady Bradbury also contributed funds towards reparations of the town's church. After the death of her brother, the vicar, in 1521 Lady Bradbury carried out a project which he had long contemplated, the setting up of a grammar school in the town. Within a year of his death Lady Bradbury had found a schoolmaster, whose salary she paid herself until she had arranged, by 1525, for the endowment of the school. One of the school's students in the early 1560s was the writer Gabriel Harvey; in Have with You to Saffron-Walden (1596), the satirist Thomas Nashe claimed that while there Harvey was known as a 'desperate stabber with penknives'.

During her widowhood, Lady Bradbury doubled the inheritance from Thomas Bradbury which had been her jointure, purchasing the properties in Middlesex which endowed her chantry as well as several manors, including Willingale Spain, which partly supported her school in Saffron Walden, and Black Notley. She made her last will on 2 March 1530, and died near the end of that month. She was buried beside her second husband.

The perpetual chantry founded by Dame Joan was dissolved under Edward VI, but some of the properties still remain with the Mercers' Company and are known as "Lady Bradbury's Estate in Covent Garden". The school she founded in Saffron Walden is still in existence; it is currently known as Dame Bradbury's School.
