= Saffron Walden Grammar School =

Saffron Walden Free Grammar School

Location
- Saffron Walden, Essex; England
- Coordinates: 52°01′33″N 0°15′09″E

Information
- Established: 1525
- Founder: Dame Joan Bradbury
- Closed: 1940
- Gender: Boys

Saffron Walden Free Grammar School (or Saffron Walden Grammar School) was a school in the Essex town of Saffron Walden, which for over four hundred years educated the boys of the town and surrounding villages in a manner designed to be after the model of Eton College and Winchester College. It was notable for its longevity and for some of its illustrious alumni.

== History ==
The earliest schools in Walden dated from 1423 under the control of the neighbouring monastery. The Grammar School was founded by Dame Joan Bradbury in 1522. Lady Joan was the wife of London's Lord Mayor Thomas Bradbury (d.1510); her brother, John Leche, was the Rector of Saffron Walden. The grammar school by its constitution was for the benefit of the town and three villages in its vicinity. Joan and her brother, along with the local abbot and monastery, arranged its endowment with local guilds. They erected a school house and school room and Dame Joan "granted a rent charge for the support of a priest and to teach the children grammar after the order and use of Winchester and Eton." In some histories, the school is deemed the successor of the 1423 establishment and thus has been described as having been refounded by Edward VI. The school bore the Tudor royal arms

== Buildings ==
The original building, designed for 60 pupils, flanked the churchyard wall. It was replaced in 1655 by new premises in Castle Street. After over two hundred years in these buildings, which in part still stand today, the school moved to new buildings in 1881 in Ashdon Road which remained the home of the school until the Second World War. During World War II the 8th Air Force's 65th fighter wing (which was assigned the additional duty of Air Sea Rescue) had its fighter control center in the building because of its proximity to Debden airfield.

== Former masters ==
- William Dawson, later knighted, was the first master.
- Rev John Collins MA (of Trinity College, Dublin and Queens' College, Cambridge) was master in 1845

== Notable former pupils ==
- Gabriel Harvey (c. 1545–1630) - writer whose conduct at the school was satirized by Thomas Nashe in Have with You to Saffron-Walden (1596).
- Edward Mellish (1880–1962) - recipient of the Victoria Cross
- Henry Marking (11 March 1920 – 16 May 2002) - former British Airways head

== See also ==
- List of English and Welsh endowed schools (19th century)
