= Parnassus plays =

Satiric comedies, written c. 1598–1602

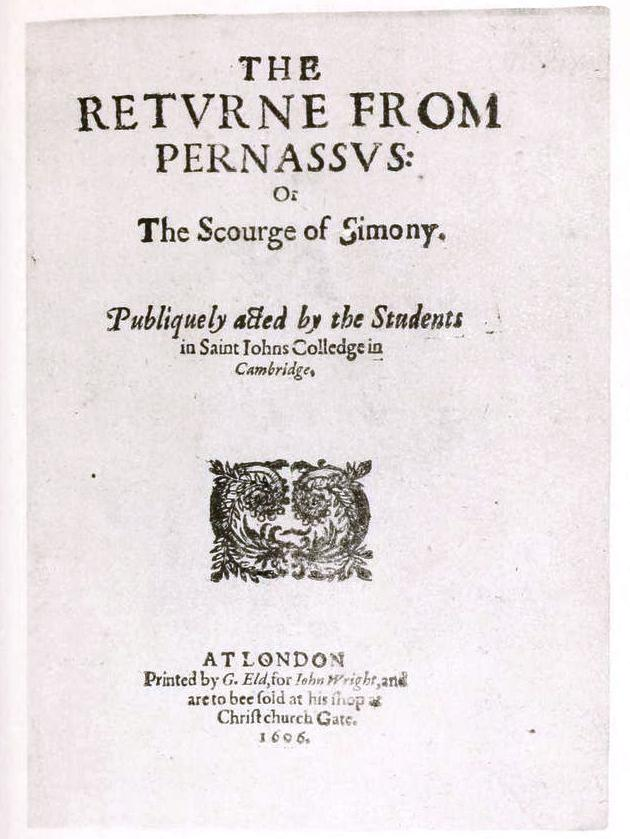
Title page of The Return from Parnassus: Or the Scourge of Simony (1606)

The Parnassus plays are three satiric comedies, or full-length academic dramas, each divided into five acts. They date from between 1598 and 1602. They were performed in London by students for an audience of students as part of the Christmas festivities of St John's College at Cambridge University. It is not known who wrote them.

The titles of the three plays are

- The Pilgrimage to Parnassus
- The Return from Parnassus
- The Return from Parnassus: Or the Scourge of Simony

The second and third plays are sometimes referred to as Part One and Part Two of The Return from Parnassus.

The trilogy raises an Elizabethan question: After college – what comes next? Francis Bacon in his essay "Of Seditions and Troubles" pointed to a 16th-century problem – universities were producing more scholars than there were opportunities for them. The University Wits – Lily, Marlowe, Green, Peele, Nashe and Lodge – were scholars who found employment in theatre, not perhaps their first choice, but there was little else for them. Their great education tended to discourage them from taking up the humble trades of their fathers. The Parnassus plays may not provide a solution, but they at least illustrate the fears of such ambitious young scholastic dreamers.

For the most part, the plays follow the experiences of two students, Philomusus and Studioso. The first play tells the story of two pilgrims on a journey to Parnassus. The plot is an allegory understood to represent the story of two students progressing through the traditional course of education known as the trivium. The accomplishment of their education is represented by Mount Parnassus. The second play drops the allegory and describes the two graduates' unsuccessful attempts to make a living, as does the third play, which is the only one that was contemporaneously published. New in the third play is the serious treatment of issues regarding censorship.

It has been said that this trilogy of plays "in originality and breadth of execution, and in complex relationship to the academic, literary, theatrical and social life of the period, ranks supreme among the extant memorials of the university stage", and that they are "among the most inexplicably neglected key documents of Shakespeare's age".

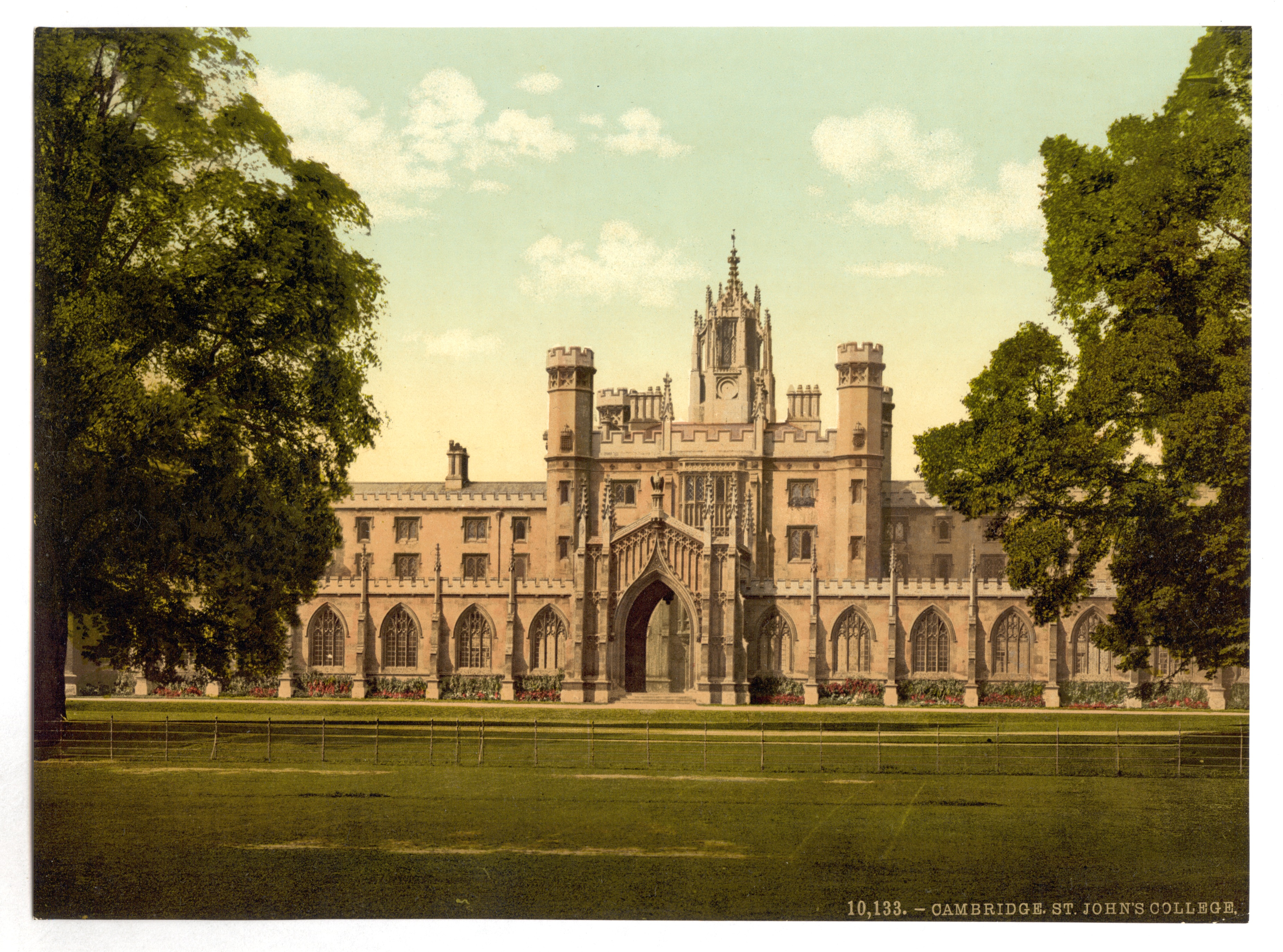
St. John's College, Cambridge, England, where the Parnassus plays were performed

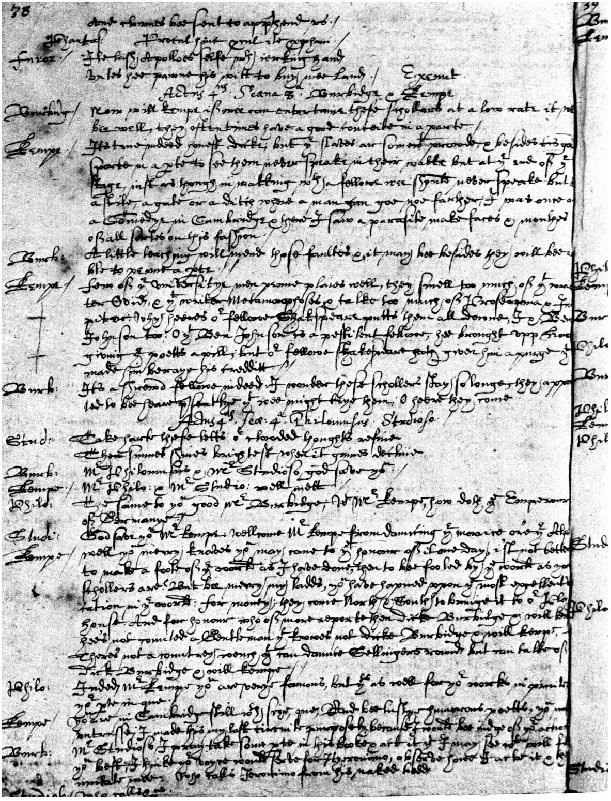
Manuscript of the Return from Parnassus; Or the Scourge of Simony, the page containing Kempe's comment on Shakespeare. Act IV, scene 4

== Overview of the three plays ==
The first play, The Pilgrimage to Parnassus, describes allegorically the progress of the two students through the university courses of the trivium, grammar, logic and rhetoric, and the temptations that are set before them by their meeting with Madido, a drunkard, Stupido, a puritan who hates learning, Amoretto, a lover, and Ingenioso, a disappointed student.

The first play was certainly intended to stand alone, but the favour with which it was received led to the writing of a sequel, The Return from Parnassus, which deals with the struggles of the two students after the completion of their studies at the university, and shows them discovering by bitter experience of how little pecuniary value their learning is.

A further sequel, The Return from Parnassus, Or the Scourge of Simony, is more ambitious than the two earlier plays. Knowledge of what occurs in the first two plays is not essential to understand the third play, but it is helpful to illuminate a few of the allusions that occur.

The trilogy of the Parnassus plays can be seen as a sustained questioning of the worth of a humanist education, and as a consideration of the employment crisis that faced graduates at the end of the Elizabethan period. The plays are lively and amusing, and contain a sense of taking stock of the writer's place in society at the turn of the century. They are neglected by academic scholarship, and not greatly appreciated as plays in their own right, but they are known as a source for references to Shakespeare and Jonson, and for other allusions they contain.

== Synopsis of The Pilgrimage to Parnassus ==
Cast

- Studioso
- Philomusus
- Consiliodorus
- Madido
- Stupido
- Amoretto
- Ingenioso
- Clowne
- Dromo

An old farmer, Consiliodorus, gives advice to his son, Philomusus, and his nephew, Studioso, as the two young men are about to begin their journey to Parnassus. He advises them not to consort with wastrels and to eschew alcohol and sex, which will distract them. The first place the two young men travel through is the mountainous land of Logique on their way to the island of Dialectica, where they meet a poet, Madido. Madido doesn't believe in Parnassus and thinks inspiration is only to be found in drink. Madido urges them not to bother with their journey, but to stay and drink with him. They decline and continue on.

Next, in the land of Rhetorique, Philomusus and Studioso overtake a character named Stupido, who set out on the same pilgrimage ten years ago, but has given up and now follows trivial pursuits. He disguises his lack of talent with a pose of not appreciating scholarship.

Philomusus and Studioso then encounter the lover, Amaretto, who encourages them to leave their pilgrimage, and instead linger in the land of Poetry and dally with wenches. This time Philomusus and Studioso are persuaded and abandon, at least for a while, the path to Parnassus.

Before it's too late, Philomusus and Studioso have come to their senses, have decided to leave the amorous land of poetry. They continue on, and meet a character who is former student, Ingenioso. He tries to discourage Philomusus and Studioso from their pilgrimage by telling them that there is nothing but poverty on Mount Parnassus. Dromo enters drawing on a clown by a rope, because he feels that every play needs a clown. They finally arrive at the foothills of Mount Parnassus, and take a moment to gaze up at it in a spirit of celebration. Studioso invites the audience to applaud.

== Synopsis of The Return from Parnassus ==
Cast

- Studioso
- Philomusus
- Consiliodorus
- Ingenioso
- Luxurioso
- Gullio
- Leonarde
- Draper
- Tayler
- Simson
- Parcevall
- Boy to Luxurioso
- Boy to Studioso
- Stage Keeper

Consiliodorus, father to Philomusus and uncle to Studioso is meeting with a messenger, Leonarde, who will deliver a letter to Philomusus and Studioso. He sent those two young men to on a journey seven years ago, and now expects results. Consiliodorus exits as Philomusus and Studioso enter, both bemoaning that since leaving Parnassus fate hasn't been kind, and the world is not a fruitful place for scholars. They meet a former student, Ingenioso, who tells them he has been living by the printing house and selling pamphlets. Now he is pursuing the support of a patron. The patron appears, and Ingenioso offers him immortality through his verse. Ingenioso then offers the patron a pamphlet that is dedicated to him. The patron glances at it, gives Ingenioso two small coins, and exits. Ingenioso, alone, is furious with the patron's miserliness. Philomusus and Studioso reenter to hear how it went. Ingenioso now plans to go to London and live by the printers trade. Philomusus and Studioso decide to go along, and include Luxuioso, who has also left Parnassus to go to London. The four, now former students, take a moment to bid farewell to Parnassus.

The Draper and the Tayler, local businessmen, both complain that they trusted Philomusus and Studioso, did some draping and tailoring, and Philomusus and Studioso ran away owing them money. The Tapster has a similar problem with another former student, Luxuioso. Philomusus and Studioso meet up, both complain of the lowly jobs they have taken, Philomusus is a sexton/gravedigger, and Studioso is a household servant, farmhand, waiter and tutor. Percevall enters with a grave-digging job for Philomusus. Percevall wants Philomusus to quickly dig a grave for his father, who may not be dead yet, but will be very soon. He also wants Philomusus to write out the soon-to-be-dead father's will so that Percevall will inherit his fortune. Next Studioso enters with the boy he is tutoring, and attempts to give a lesson in Latin grammar. Then Luxurio and a boy enter, on the way to a fair. Luxurio has written some poems and plans to sell them at the fair by having the boy recite them. They give a demonstration.

Ingenioso has found a kind of patron in Gullio, a character that is partly based on Thomas Nashe's portrait of "an upstart" in his pamphlet Pierce Penniless. Gullio "maintains" Ingenioso very neglectfully. Foppishly dressed Gullio falsely boasts of being a valiant, noble and romantic character. Ingenioso offers himself as a poet to memorialize Gullio in sonnets. Gullio then persuades Ingenioso to impersonate his mistress, Lesbia, while Gullio rehearses love poetry that Gullio himself has written and derived from Shakespeare's Romeo and Juliet and Venus and Adonis. Gullio plans to eventually recite these verses as part of his wooing of Lesbia. In the next scene, Consiliodorus, father to Philomusus, uncle to Studioso, who funded their journey to Parnassus meets with the carrier and horse-back messenger Leonarde. Leonarde reports that he scolded Philomusus and Studioso and reminded them that their nurturing was costly. Leonarde thinks they may have found jobs as clerks. Consiliodorus is disappointed they are not doing as well as they should be doing.

Ingenioso composes amorous verses in the styles of Chaucer, Spenser, and William Shakespeare, the last alone being to the patron's satisfaction. Gullio, a great admirer of "sweet Mr. Shakespeare", says he will obtain a picture of him for his study and will "worship sweet Mr Shakespeare and to honour him will lay his Venus and Adonis under my pillow, as we read of one – I do not well remember his name, but I'm sure he was a king – slept with Homer under his bed's head". Percevall enters. He has a new position as the church warden and is now referred to as Mr. Warden. He's looking for the Sexton, who is Philomusus. Philomusus hasn't been doing a good job as Sexton, and Perceval informs him he is no longer the Sexton. Studioso then enters, he has also lost his position, which was to be tutor to a young boy and perform other household tasks. These two protagonists have reached a depth of hopeless misery ill-equipped for a world that does not appreciate scholars. At least they have each other, as they dejectedly agree to go wandering off in poverty together.

Ingenioso's foolish patron, Gullio, had asked Ingenioso to write and deliver poetic messages to a young woman. This goes badly, Gullio blames Ingenioso, and yet another former scholar, Ingenioso, loses his position. Rather than go wandering off like Studioso and Philomusus, Ingenioso resorts, once again, to pamphleteering for the popular press.

Luxurio appears along with the boy. Luxurio's attempt to sell his poems has not been fruitful, and he is now broke. He bids farewell to poetry. He intends to go away, drink the world dry, as he accepts his status as a beggar.

== Synopsis of The Return from Parnassus; Or the Scourge of Simony ==
Cast

- Ingenioso
- Judicio
- Danter
- Philomusus
- Studioso
- Furur Poeticus
- Phantasma
- Patient
- Richardetto
- Theodore
- Burgess
- Jaques
- Academico
- Amoretto
- Page
- Signor Immerito
- Stercutio
- Sir Raderick
- Recorder
- Page
- Prodigo
- Burbage
- Kempe
- Fiddlers
- Patient's Man
- (and others in the prologue)

Before the play begins, Studioso and Philomusus travelled to Rome with the expectation of becoming rich, but they discovered that expatriate Englishmen don't live as well as they had hoped. They then travelled around, and tried various honest jobs, but now they have run out of such opportunities, and must therefore turn to dishonest work. They establish a medical practice in London, with Philomusus masquerading as a fashionable French doctor, but they end that charade in time to avoid arrest.

Ingenioso has now become a satirist. On the excuse of discussing a recently published collection of extracts from contemporary poetry, John Bodenham's Belvedere, he briefly criticises a number of writers of the day, including Edmund Spenser, Henry Constable, Michael Drayton, John Davies, John Marston, Christopher Marlowe, Ben Jonson, Shakespeare, and Thomas Nashe; the last of whom is referred to as dead. Ingenioso attempts to sell a book to a printer named Danter. Ingenioso's last book lost money, but his new one is more promising, it's about cuckolds in Cambridge.

Needing employment, Academico finds his old friend from college, Amoretto, whose father, Sir Raderick, has a position as a parson to offer. But Amoretto has just accepted a bribe to give it to Immerito. Amoretto pretends not to recognize Academico, and gets rid of him by an off-putting and lengthy discourse regarding technicalities of hunting. Immerito is examined by Sir Radeerick and the Recorder, who find him educated and pliable enough for the job. This practice of selling church positions is "simony", which is referred to in the subtitle of this play.

Sir Raderick is worried about certain libels written about his family, which are going around in London. They are being written in verse by Furor Poeticus at the encouragement of Ingenioso. A confrontation occurs between the poets and sir Raderick, after he has taken possession of Prodigo's forfeited land.

Studioso and Philomusus attempt other jobs. They apply to Richard Burbage's theatre hoping to become actors, but they realize that actors don't get paid enough. They are engaged by a company of fiddlers, but their first performance is at the front door of Sir Raderick's house. The pages of Sir Raderick and Amoretto pretend to be their masters, and dismiss the fiddlers without payment. At last, Studioso and Philomusus decide to work as shepherds in Kent, while Ingenioso and Furor have to escape to the Isle of Dogs. Academico goes back to Cambridge.

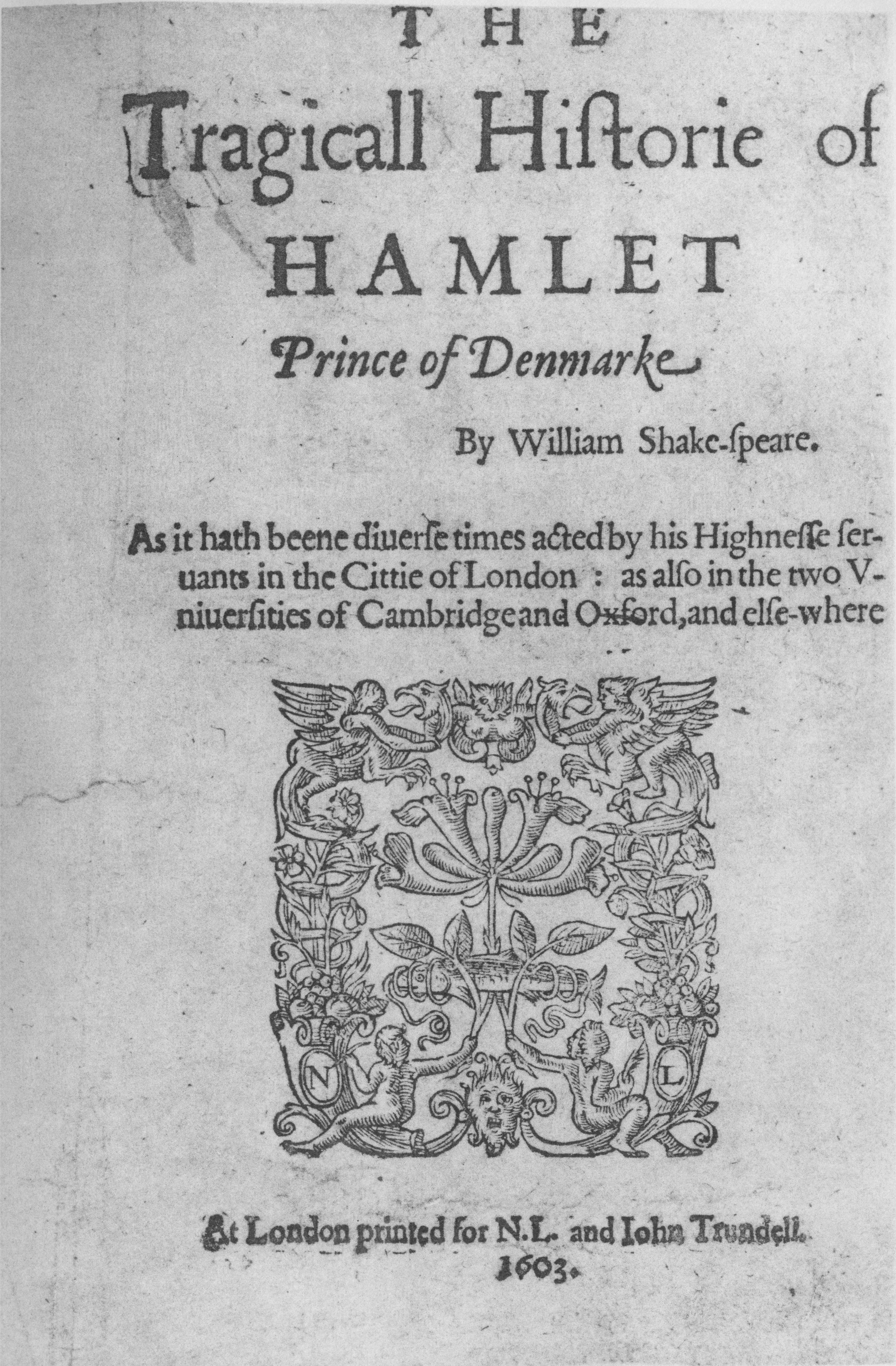
Hamlet Q1 Frontispiece 1603

Will Kempe's comment on Shakespeare: "Few of the university men pen plays well, they smell too much of that writer Ovid, and that writer Metamorphoses, and talk too much of Proserpina and Jupiter. Why here's our fellow Shakespeare puts them all down, I and Ben Jonson too. O that Ben Jonson is a pestilent fellow, he brought up Horace giving the Poets a pill, but our fellow Shakespeare hath given him a purge that made him beray his credit." From the handwritten manuscript of The Return from Parnassus; Or the Scourge of Simony.

== Authorship ==
It is not known who wrote them or if they were all the work of one person. John Day was suggested as a possible author by Bolton Corney in 1868, based on a copy of the 1606 quarto, on which was hand-written, "To my Lovinge Smallocke J: D:", and also based on Corney's comparison of the handwriting, and on personal connections that Day had as a Cambridge man. But the suggestion has had little support.

Some clues to the author's identity are offered in the prologue to the second play, The Return from Parnassus, but they are not enough to make an identification. Whoever the author was, the plays indicate that he was intelligent, observant and well read. The author may have included a self-portrait in the character "Judicio". Judicio appears in the third play and comments on a number of contemporary poets.

== Dating ==
The three pieces were evidently performed at Christmas of different years, not later than Christmas 1602, because of the references to Queen Elizabeth I, who died in March 1603. The first play, Pilgrimage to Parnassus can not have been written earlier than 1598, because it mentions books that were not printed until that year. The prologue of the third play, The Return from Parnassus: Or the Scourge of Simony, states that that play had been written for the preceding year, so the year 1601 seems credible for the writing of the last play of the trilogy.

== Shakespeare in the text of the Parnassus plays ==
William Shakespeare is alluded to often, and his works are quoted by one count at least 95 times in the three Parnassus plays. He is explicitly mentioned by name in the last two plays. At almost every turn he is satirized or mocked, which is to be expected in a satire, especially when the target of the satire has become very successful and well known.

The Parnassus plays are seen, at least in part, as extending the war of words that had been occurring between the university men and those who were not part of that group. The university men would include Cambridge alumni Thomas Nashe and Robert Greene, who both had attacked Shakespeare in print: Nashe in his pamphlet, Pierce Penniless, and Greene in Greene's Groats-Worth of Wit. Shakespeare had replied in turn with some mockery of Nashe in his play Love's Labour's Lost.

Shakespeare and his theatre company were on tour probably in 1601 and visited Oxford and Cambridge, sometime between the performances of parts two and three of the trilogy. This is indicated on the title-page of the first quarto of Hamlet (1603), where the play is said to have been acted "in the two Universities."

Just such a troupe of low-born actors is described in The Return to Parnassus; the Scourge of Simony, as they might be seen from the point-of-view of competitive and envious young scholars:

England affords those glorious vagabonds
That carried earst their fardels on their backes,
Coursers to ride on through the gazing streetes,
Sooping it in their glaring Satten sutes,
And Pages to attend their Maisterships:
With mouthing words that better wits have framed,
They purchase lands, and now Esquiers are namde.

A tone of bitter mockery is established as Philomusus and Studiosus, out of desperation, audition for the professional stage, and are judged by Richard Burbage and Will Kemp, two important members of Shakespeare's company, the Lord Chamberlain's Men. Burbage and Kemp find humor in the deficiencies of scholars not only as actors but also as dramatists:

KEMPE: The slaves are somewhat proud, and besides it is a good sport in a part to see them never speak in their walk, but at the end of the stage, just as though in walking with a fellow we should never speak but at a stile, a gate, or a ditch, where a man can go no further….

BURBAGE: A little teaching will mend these faults, and it may be besides they will be able to pen a part.

KEMPE: Few of the University [men] plaies well, they smell too much of that writer Ovid, and that writer Metamorphosis, and talk too much of Proserpina and Jupiter. Why heres our fellow Shakespeare puts them all downe, I and Ben Jonson too. O that Ben Jonson is a pestilent fellow, he brought up Horace giving the poets a pill, but our fellow Shakespeare hath given him a purge that made him bewray his credit.

This well-known passage is bitterly ironic: The author of the Parnassus plays is holding up to scorn – for an academic audience – the opinions of two illiterate fools, Burbage and Kempe, who think that Metamorphosis is a writer, and that their colleague, Shakespeare, puts the university playwrights to shame.

The audition piece Philomusus is asked to perform is taken from the opening monologue of Shakespeare's play, Richard III: "Now is the winter of our discontent made glorious summer by this son of York." In this part of the trilogy, Shakespeare is seen as a poet, and also as a dramatist and actor.

In the second play, The Return from Parnasus, the character named Gullio, who is lovesick and a fool, is mocked for his worshipful devotion to "pure Shakspeare and shreds of poetry that he hath gathered at the theaters." When Gullio later cries out, "O sweet Mr. Shakspeare! I'll have his picture in my study at the court," it suggests that young scholars who appreciated Shakespeare's writing, also had a regard for his person.

The author of the Parnassus plays has the character Judico comment on a number of poets, and he considers Shakespeare:

Who loves not Adons love, or Lucrece rape?
His sweeter verse contaynes hart throbbing line,
Could but a graver subject him content
Without loves foolish lazy languishment.

Apparently he admires the language and verse in Shakespeare's early poems, but suggests that Shakespeare may have been wasting his talent by writing love poetry. This faint praise of Shakespeare the actor-poet contrasts with the greater praise he gives to Drayton, Nashe and others.

== Identifying allusions ==
The question of whether or not the characters are meant to represent actual persons, and if so to what extent, has been much discussed. Much of the speculation centering around the London literary scene. However, sustained reference to the London scene, is not a part of the first play, but enters into the trilogy only in the second and third parts. It is thought that by the time the final part was written the author may have more or less identified Ingenioso with Nashe, though the character was not originally conceived with this intention. Ingenioso does speak in praise of Nashe, who died in 1601. The author of the plays was evidently very familiar with Nashe's works, and all three parts are full of reminiscences of Nashe's writings. In the third play Ingenioso announces that he is in trouble for the plays he has written, and he exits saying, "now I am bound for the Ile of doggs … Fare well." A notorious dramatic satire titled The Isle of Dogs, written by Nashe and Ben Jonson, and performed in 1597, was considered so slanderous that the Privy Council gave in to pressure from the City government and demanded theatrical performances be stopped and that London's playhouses be torn down.

It is thought that the two students, Studioso and Philomusus are in part portrayals of Shakespeare and Thomas Kyd. Of course Shakespeare never attended university, but for the students there might be some satiric pleasure in imagining such a character attempting Cambridge, meeting failure, and in the end being forced to return to the country life from whence he came, as occurs in the plays.

It is thought that "Furor Poeticus" represents John Marston, and "Luxurio" represents Gabriel Harvey.

The courtier Gullio is not only a character in the play but is used to satirize Shakespeare's patron the Earl of Southampton, who also attended St. John's. Southampton would not have attended the performance in 1601, he was at the time under sentence of death for his part in the Essex conspiracy.

The printer Danter, who appears in the third play, is based on actual person, a printer named John Danter, who is noted for printing the piratical first quarto of Romeo and Juliet, as well as other plays and texts.

The college recorder, Francis Brackyn was an actual person, who is harshly satirized in The Return from Parnassus: Or the Scourge of Simony as the character "Recorder". Brackyn had been ridiculed in another university play, Club Rules, and would be yet again as the title character in George Ruggle's 1615 academic play Ignoramus.

== The surrounding political climate for students and universities and Hamlet ==
The Parnassus plays were written and performed in early modern England in a time of dramatic political and religious changes. Universities were transitioning away from Catholic and into Reformed institutions. Previously the schools educated students to follow a set path to become priests or to take up other roles in the church. In Elizabethan England, the schools were teaching scholarly debate, observation, the philosophy of Francis Bacon, and a course of study which supported the state — a newly Reformist Britain. Students also graduated to take up varied careers. This dramatic sea-change was accompanied by increased anxiety, among students, the schools, and the Tudor Court. The students found themselves the object of constant close observation.

Dramatic performances were considered an important part of study. They provided students a chance to explore ideas, to see themselves in various roles, and to practice their Latin or Greek.

The Privy Council supported university theaters by funding certain performances. However there were also Puritan minded persons who objected to student performances — suspecting they were remnants of the rites of Catholicism. One observer claimed: "So subtle is the devil, that under the cover of recreation in London and of exercise of learning in the universities, by seeing of plays, he taketh us to join with the Gentiles in their corruptions."

In Cambridge, where the Parnassus plays were performed, the wooden architecture of the theatre itself was designed to provide teachers and college authorities seats that were above and to the side — which gave them an opportunity to observe the performances, as well as the reactions of the student audiences.

The first of the three plays, The Pilgrimage to Parnassus, presents allegorically the established path of a student moving through the course of study to obtain a degree, and wouldn’t have given the authorities reason for concern.

The next two plays introduce something new — the characters are able to occasionally break the "forth wall" and make sport of referring to the audience, as well as the professors and authority figures perched in their seats above. This allowed the "observation of students" to become a subject of comment, or a minor theme of the performance.

Shakespeare’s play, Hamlet, was performed at Cambridge in the same period of time and general political climate as the Parnassus plays. This performance is mentioned on the title page of the first quarto. Though Hamlet is set in Denmark, and is based on a story that dates back to the 1300s, the scenes with students are Shakespeare’s addition to the Danish story. Those scenes resemble current Elizabethan England much more than historic Denmark. The cast of characters in Hamlet includes a number of former and current university students: Hamlet, Horatio, Polonius, and probably Laertes, Rosencrantz and Guildenstern. The play shows the characters in Hamlet also existing in a similar climate of spying at the court of Elsinore. In various episodes Hamlet is spied on by the king, by Polonius, by his mother, and by Rosencrantz and Guildenstern. Hamlet spies on his uncle to judge his guilt. A study of the two contemporaneous plays can be illuminating each for the other.

== Printing history ==
The third play, The Return from Parnassus; the Scourge of Simony, was licensed and entered into the Stationers' Register in 1605 by Owen Gwyn:

Oct’. [1605]
lo. Wright. Entred for his copy vnder thands of Mr
Owen Gwyn and the wardens an. Enterlude called.
The retourne from Pernassus or the scourge of Si-
mony publiquely Acted by the students in St Johns
College in Cambridge.

It was then published twice in 1606 – four years after its original performance – with many textual variations between the two editions. It was reprinted in the 18th century, and again in 1879. The third play was the only part that was published, and for many years the first two plays were considered lost. Then in 1886 W. D. Macray, the librarian of the Bodleian Library at Oxford, discovered the lost plays, while he was doing research among the manuscripts collected by Thomas Hearne, which are part of the Richard Rawlinson collection at the Bodleian Library. Macray immediately edited and published all three plays together.

The handwritten manuscripts of the first two plays consist of twenty folio leaves, and were written imperfectly by a copyist who may have had trouble at times reading the original.

A handwritten manuscript of the third play, The Return from Parnassus, or the Scourge of Simony, also exists. It was found in an old family library, according to Macray. The handwriting indicates that it is contemporary with the play's first performances. It is a small quarto volume, bound in parchment. The manuscript is housed in the Folger Shakespeare Library.

Study of the handwritten manuscript of the third play, owned by James Halliwell-Phillipps, has helped to correct a number of errors that exist in the early printed editions.

== A reading ==
A rehearsed reading of the Return from Parnassus, or The Scourge of Simony was performed 6 December 2009 as part of Shakespeare's Globe Theatre's Read Not Dead series. The cast included David Oakes as Ingenious and Kevin Quarmby as Burbage.
