= Thomas Heath =

Thomas Heath may refer to:

- Thomas Heath (classicist) (1861–1940), British civil servant, and historian of ancient Greek mathematics
- Thomas Heath (cricketer) (1806–1872), English cricketer
- Thomas Kurton Heath (1853–1938), American vaudeville actor
- Tommy Heath (born 1947),American musician
- Tommy Heath (baseball) (1913–1967), American baseball catcher, scout, and manager
- Thomas Heath Haviland Sr. (1795–1867), Canadian land owner and banker
- Thomas Heath Haviland (1822–1895), Canadian lawyer and politician
- Thomas Heath Robinson (1869–1954), English illustrator
- Thomas Heth (or Heath) (fl. 1583), English mathematician
