= Archives of California =

Coordinates: 37°52′20″N 122°15′32″W

The Archives of California were the records of the civil government of Spanish and Mexican Alta California, kept for roughly eighty years chiefly at the presidio of Monterey, the provincial capital. They passed into United States custody after the Mexican–American War and became the documentary basis of land-title litigation under the California Land Act of 1851. The entire collection was destroyed in the 1906 San Francisco earthquake and fire. It is known today chiefly through the sixty-three volumes of abstracts and copies made in 1876 and 1877 for the historian Hubert Howe Bancroft under Thomas Savage, held at the Bancroft Library as BANC MSS C-A.

== The working archive ==
Because Monterey was capital, presidio and port at once, its records covered all three functions, and the collection was correspondingly broader than the archives of the other presidios. It contained what a frontier government generates: military service records and enlistment papers, budgets and supply distributions, official correspondence running up to the viceroy and down to the corporals, commissions, decrees, censuses, naturalizations, passports, and copies of land-grant concessions.

The archive moved with politics. Governor José María de Echeandía shipped it to San Diego in 1826 and kept it there two years; San Diego papers were folded in under Manuel Micheltorena in 1842; and part of the central holdings was sent to Los Angeles in 1845. It had already survived one near-destruction, when the records were hauled out of Monterey as Hippolyte Bouchard's privateers burned the town in 1818.

== American custody and the land claims ==
The conquest of 1846 and the years that followed cost the archive heavily before any fire. Documents were burned by soldiers at San Rafael in 1846, papers were used as scrap in a United States military hospital, and John C. Frémont, who carried off part of the collection, lost papers relating to a land grant of his rival José Castro. California's first legislature founded a state archive in 1850 without mentioning the Hispano-Mexican records at all.

What gave the archive its new importance was litigation. The California Land Act of 1851 required every holder of a Spanish or Mexican grant to prove title before a federal commission, and the records became evidence. Custody passed to the office of the United States Surveyor General in San Francisco. Bowman and Nunis estimate that roughly fifteen per cent of the documents had already been lost before the principal collection was assembled in 1858, though they are careful that the figure is an estimate of papers never collected, measured against what survived to 1906, rather than a measured loss.

== Stanton's rebinding ==
In 1858 Edwin Stanton, sent to California to defend a federal suit over land claims covering much of San Francisco, gathered documents from across the state and had the loose papers bound into volumes. Stanton did not read Spanish, and the work was done under severe time pressure; Bowman and Nunis attribute the hasty binding itself to the keeper Rufus C. Hopkins, working to Stanton's schedule.

The series names imposed then are the ones the surviving copies still carry, among them Provincial Records, Departmental State Papers, and State Papers, Missions and Colonization. Several derive merely from the places the papers had passed through, such as Benicia and Sacramento, neither of which existed as such in the Mexican period, and the arrangement disregarded the original order of the records. The Franciscan historian Zephyrin Engelhardt called the result "a sad failure," adding that since no general index existed, "the inquirer was obliged to go through the entire series."

== Keepers, scale and the lost index ==
The office of Keeper of the Archives gradually professionalised. Hopkins served from 1855 to 1878, and later keepers included Alexander Forbes and Charles F. Gompertz. The historian Zoeth Skinner Eldredge, who worked in the archive without holding office in it, found the pages of a single report scattered across the collection and numbered the volumes himself.

By 1890 the archive held some 280,639 pages of Spanish documents. In 1891 the Surveyor General's office completed a copy and translation of 579 land-grant expedientes, running to about 18,200 pages, into the California state archives. Gompertz spent years on a card index and had described about 138 of the volumes, a little under half the collection, by 1904. It burned with the records themselves.

The collection's extent is given differently by different authorities, and the discrepancy is unresolved. Brick states that Eldredge numbered the volumes from 1 to 302; Bowman and Nunis give Eldredge's numbering as reaching 274 and treat 302 as the Surveyor General's own count of 1902.

== The 1903 removal attempt ==
In February 1903, at the request of the Librarian of Congress Herbert Putnam, the Secretary of the Interior ordered the volumes packed and shipped to the Library of Congress. A Californian counter-campaign, in which Gompertz, Eldredge and the San Francisco Chronicle took part and which produced two legislative resolutions, defeated the order within a fortnight, and it was suspended on 18 February 1903. Putnam had argued for removal partly on the ground that the building was not fireproof.

== Destruction ==
The Surveyor General's office and the archive inside it were destroyed in the earthquake and fire of April 1906, together with Gompertz's index. The land-grant series, kept in a fireproof safe, was the only part to survive in the original.

== The Savage copies ==
In 1876 and 1877, before the fire, Bancroft had the archive abstracted. A workshop of Spanish-speaking clerks directed by Thomas Savage worked through the records in the Surveyor General's office over about ten months, producing sixty-three bound volumes at a cost Savage put at nearly $10,000; simple copying, he estimated, would have cost $40,000.

The copies are not facsimiles. In Savage's words, the substance of a useful document "had to be carefully extracted, and written down concisely tho' clearly," while anything important enough "was taken down verbatim et literatim," and material judged of no practical use was omitted. Historians have therefore treated the volumes as an edited record. Bowman concluded that "the world is the richer for its having been done at all," since the fire destroyed the originals and no other user made abstracts or copies beyond those published in their own works. The ethnohistorian Randall Milliken, comparing an abstract against a surviving original, warned that the volumes "are neither originals nor true copies" but paraphrases, in which details about Indian people were often omitted.

Three separate figures are sometimes confused. Sixty-three is the number of Bancroft's bound copy volumes, now BANC MSS C-A 1 to 63; about 271 to 273 is Bancroft's rounded count of the original volumes those copies abstract; and 302 is the maximum physical extent recorded for the whole archive by 1902.

The contents of the sixty-three volumes have been catalogued item by item in Archives of California: A Documentary Calendar of the Savage Transcripts, an online index that describes the documents in C-A 1 to 63 and links each to its page in the digitised manuscripts.

== Other surviving traces ==
Because historians used the archive before it burned, their citations preserve a second, independent trace of lost documents. Theodore Henry Hittell used the archive before the fire and cited it throughout his history of California. John W. Dwinelle reproduced seventy-nine documents in full in 1863, about fourteen of them with archive shelf-marks, including the act founding the pueblo of San José. Eldredge made his own transcripts, and pre-fire finding aids survive from Hopkins and from Eugene Drake, whose 1861 index covered 433 expedientes.
