= Richard Carmarden =

- Born: c.1536
- Died: 1603
- Buried: Chislehurst, Kent
- Spouses: Alice More; Mary Alington
- Issue: Richard Carmarden; Nathaniel Carmarden; Mary Carmarden
- Father: Thomas Carmarden
- Mother: Dorothy Alexander

Richard Carmarden (died 1603) was an English merchant, member of the Merchant Taylors Company, and Surveyor of the Customs for London. He paid for the printing of the Bible in English in Rouen in 1566, and in 1570 wrote A Caveat for the Quene.

== Family ==
Richard Carmarden was the son of Thomas Carmarden and Dorothy Alexander, the daughter of Paul Alexander.

== Career ==
Carmarden is first heard of in 1566 when he funded the printing of an edition of the Great Bible in English at Rouen. At an unknown date he became a member of the Company of Merchant Taylors. In 1570 he wrote A Caveat for the Quene.

In 1590, when the administration of the customs was reorganized after Thomas Smythe failed to negotiate a renewal of his patent to farm the customs, the London merchant Sir Thomas Middleton was appointed Receiver General of Customs Revenues, while the London alderman Henry Billingsley was made chief Customer of the Port of London. The 'next most important officer' in London was Carmarden, who was appointed Surveyor of Customs. According to Newton, 'in order that he might hold a position of greater independence, Carmarden received out of the Receipt of the Exchequer £200 a year out of his whole salary of £256 13s 4d, the remainder, the traditional stipend of the surveyor, being defalked on the customs accounts'.

As Surveyor of Customs one of his tasks was to search for foreign books being imported into the realm. In a letter written to Lord Burghley in 1597 Carmarden refers to the 'commandment unto me given charge and daily to all her Majesty's waiters to look narrowly after all books that come into this port from foreign parts'. Carmarden also on one occasion is recorded as having imported forty reams of printed books himself.

During Thomas Smythe's tenure as Customer, Carmarden had been frequently employed by Lord Burghley on special Exchequer commissions. His relationship with the Lord Treasurer continued to be a close one after he was appointed Surveyor of Customs; during the 1590s he was in frequent correspondence with both Lord Burghley and with his son, Sir Robert Cecil. On at least one occasion Carmarden's advice was even sought by the Queen herself, to whom he recommended the best means of making sale of the large amount of pepper which had formed part of the rich cargo of the carrack Madre de Dios, captured off the Azores on 3 August 1592.

In 1595 Carmarden was embroiled in a controversy with the London mercer William Leveson. Carmarden's officers had confiscated certain packs belonging to Leveson, whereupon Leveson and others beat Carmarden's officers and uttered 'wild words' against the Queen's authority. Upon Carmarden's complaint, Leveson was imprisoned, but released after begging pardon and paying costs.

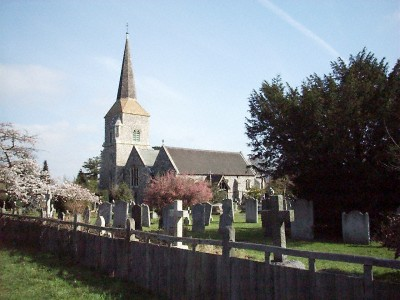
Church of St Nicholas, Chislehurst, where Richard Carmarden was buried

Carmarden's exercise of his office as Surveyor of the Customs was criticized by others besides Leveson; a contemporary manuscript is described as 'A Brief, listing a series of complaints against Richard Carmarden of London, Surveyor of the Customs to Queen Elizabeth, and the damage caused by his misbehavior to shipping, trade, and receipt of customs'.

On 1 August 1596 Richard Carmarden, described as 'Robert Cecil's man', consulted the astrologer and herbalist Simon Foreman.

Carmarden died in 1603 and was buried in the Church of St Nicholas at Chislehurst, Kent, where there is a memorial to him stating that he was aged sixty-seven at his death. In the same church are memorials to his first wife, Alice More, who died in 1586 at the age of forty-two, and to Carmarden's son-in-law, Thomas Wigg (d.1602), who married Carmarden's daughter, Mary.

== Marriages and issue ==
Carmarden married firstly Alice More, the daughter and coheir of William More of Odiham, Surrey, by whom he had two sons, Richard Carmarden and Nathaniel Carmarden, and a daughter, Mary Carmarden, who married Thomas Wigg (d.1602). Carmarden's son Richard entered Gray's Inn on 4 March 1599, and succeeded his father as Surveyor of the Customs.

Carmarden married secondly Mary Alington.
