= John Harvey (astrologer) =

English astrologer and physician

John Harvey (1564–1592) was an English astrologer and physician.

== Life ==
He was baptised at Saffron Walden, Essex, 13 February 1564, the son of John Harvey, master ropemaker, and younger brother of Gabriel Harvey and of Richard Harvey. He matriculated as a pensioner of Queens' College, Cambridge, in June 1578 (B.A. 1580 and M.A. 1584).

In 1587 the university granted Harvey a licence to practise physic, and he became a practitioner at King's Lynn in Norfolk. The Oxford English Dictionary's earliest evidence for the word topical is from 1588, in his writings. Robert Greene's contemptuous reference to Harvey and Harvey's father and two brothers in his ‘Quippe for an Upstart Courtier’ (1592) led to Gabriel Harvey's defence of his family in his ‘Foure Letters’ (1592). Gabriel describes John as ‘a proper toward man,’ ‘a skilful physician,’ and a M.D. of Cambridge, and mentions that he died, aged 29, shortly after returning to Lynn from Norwich in July 1592. He supplies a Latin epitaph. ‘John Harvey's Welcome to Robert Greene’ is the title of a sonnet included in Gabriel Harvey's ‘Foure Letters.’

== Works ==
Harvey published:

- ‘An astrological addition or supplement to be annexed to the late discourse [by his brother Richard Harvey ] upon the Great Conjunction of Saturn and Jupiter, together with the Learned Worke of Hermes Trismegistus intituled Iatromathematica, that is his Physical Mathematiques. … Lately englished by Iohn Harvey at the request of M. Charles P.,’ London, 1583 (by Richard Watkins).
- ‘A Discoursive Probleme concerning Prophesies, how far they are to be valued or credited,’ London (J. Jackson for Richard Watkins), 1588.
- ‘An Almanacke or annual Calendar, with a Compendious Prognostication for … 1589,’ London, 1588 (Lambeth).
