= William Leveson =

- Died: 1621
- Spouse: Mary Robotham
- Issue: Thomas Leveson; James Leveson
- Father: Thomas Leveson
- Mother: Ursula Gresham

William Leveson (died 1621) was a member of the Worshipful Company of Mercers and of the Company of Merchant Adventurers. Together with Thomas Savage, he was one of the trustees used by the original shareholders of the Globe Theatre in the allocation of their shares in 1599. Later, Leveson was involved in the suppression of the Essex rebellion on 8 February 1601. In 1613 he was sued by the Virginia Company.

== Family ==
William Leveson was a younger son of Thomas Leveson (1532–1576), second son of the London mercer Nicholas Leveson (d.1539) by Denise or Dionyse Bodley (d.1561), youngest daughter of Thomas Bodley (d.1493) and Joan Leche (d. March 1530). His mother was Ursula Gresham (1534–1574), one of the twelve children of Sir John Gresham, Lord Mayor of London.

Leveson had an elder brother, Sir John Leveson, who played a key role in the suppression of the rebellion of Robert Devereux, 2nd Earl of Essex, on 8 February 1601.

== Career ==
Leveson traded for twenty years as a merchant. He was a member of the Mercers' Company, the Company of Merchant Adventurers of London, and the Company of Merchants for the Discovery of Regions Unknown. Leveson experienced difficulty in being admitted to the Merchant Adventurers; in 1586 the Privy Council sent a letter to the Company urging Leveson's admission on the ground that he had been apprenticed to Robert Roe, one of the company's members, and had committed no fault.

According to Honigmann, a lawsuit in the Court of Requests in 1592 between William Leveson, mercer, and William Chapman, salter, and Roger James and his son of the same name, brewers, indicates that Leveson was 'already operating on a large scale in 1592'.

In 1595 Leveson was imprisoned on the complaint of Richard Carmarden, Surveyor of Customs for the Port of London. When Carmarden's officers confiscated Leveson's packs, Leveson and others beat the officers and uttered 'wild words' against the Queen's authority. Leveson was released from custody after begging pardon and paying costs.

According to Honigmann, it was about this time that Sir Robert Cecil began to use Leveson as the recipient of letters from foreign informants. Letters intended for Cecil were addressed to 'Mr William Lewson, merchant, at London'. Honigmann suggests that Leveson perhaps came to Cecil's attention at this time through Leveson's cousin, William Waad, Clerk of the Privy Council.

In 1599 Leveson was one of two trustees used by William Kempe, Thomas Pope (d.1603), Augustine Phillips (d.1605), John Heminges (bap. 1566, d. 1630) and William Shakespeare (1564-1616) to allocate shareholdings in the Globe Theatre. At the time, Leveson was churchwarden in the parish of St Mary Aldermanbury. Later, he resided in Philip Lane 'over against the great Digges mansion'.

Leveson was involved in the suppression of the rebellion of Robert Devereux, 2nd Earl of Essex on 8 February 1601. As a reward, Leveson asked Queen Elizabeth to grant him the lease of the Golden Key in Cheapside, a property owned by the Mercers' Company. The Queen supported his request with a letter to the Mercers, but in the end Leveson did not obtain the lease.

In 1607 Leveson raised funds for the Virginia Company, and is said to have collected 'great sums' for it. In 1613, as receiver of moneys raised in the company's lottery, he was the subject of a lawsuit by the company, which filed a Bill of Complaint in the High Court of Chancery on 15 November 1613, to which Leveson responded by an Answer dated 30 November 1613. Along with Leveson, the Company sued one William Hall, esquire, who filed an Answer on 15 February 1614. The lawsuit is a valuable source of information concerning the Virginia Company's first lottery:

The only record which will give an idea of the value of the first lottery is in the chancery proceedings, and relates to a suit of the company with William Leveson to secure moneys from the lottery, in which the sum received in 1613 is here stated to have been £2,793 and 10 shillings. The answer of Leveson is of further interest in that it alone tells of the methods by which the business was conducted and of the house built for the lottery west of St. Paul’s Church.

Leveson's will suggests that his fortunes declined in his latter years. He made his last will on 8 January 1621, leaving bequests to his wife Mary, his sons, Thomas and James, and to various servants, and died not long afterward. The will was proved on 21 June 1621.
