= William Covell =

English clergyman and writer

William Covell (died 1613) was an English clergyman and writer.

== Life ==
He was born in Chadderton, Lancashire, England, and proceeded MA at Queens' College, Cambridge in 1588.

In the 1590s Covell took part in the controversy about how far the newly reformed Church of England should abandon the liturgy and hierarchy of the past, to which debate he contributed several broadly anti-puritan works. In his later career he allied himself with Archbishop John Whitgift and afterwards with his successor, Richard Bancroft, who, like Covell, was Lancashire-born.

William Covell died in 1613 at Mersham, Kent, where he was rector.

== Works ==
Covell's interest to modern scholars now largely depends on one polemical work published in 1595, Polimanteia. In the course of this work, dedicated to the 2nd Earl of Essex, Covell briefly mentioned contemporary authors such as Thomas Nashe, Samuel Daniel and William Shakespeare.

Covell published in 1603 a religious volume which weighed in on the then-contemporary tension in the Church of England between tradition and puritanism.
