= Richard Harvey (astrologer) =

English astrologer, theologian and controversialist

Richard Harvey (1560–1630) was an English astrologer, theologian and controversialist.

== Life ==
Harvey was baptised 15 April 1560 at Saffron Walden, where his father John Harvey was a ropemaker. He was a brother of Gabriel Harvey and John Harvey (also an astrologer). He entered Pembroke Hall, Cambridge as a pensioner on 15 June 1575, proceeding B.A. 1578 and commencing M.A. 1581, and was elected fellow of his college. A noted Ramist, he once was placed in the stocks for breaking windows at Peterhouse, in retaliation for a student satire Duns Furens there.

Harvey was ordained deacon and priest in 1585, and in 1586 became rector of Chislehurst, in Kent.

== Works ==
Harvey's first book An Astrological Discourse (1583) made some stir. In it he defended judicial astrology, replying to his brother Gabriel., and gave a weather forecast for Sunday, 28 April 1583 of a great wind presaging further apocalyptic events. Harvey was here drawing on Cyprian Leowicz and Regiomontanus. With it Harvey printed A Compendious Table of Phlebotomie or Bloudletting, of eight pages, containing an "auncient commendation" of phlebotomy. The prediction failed, and Harvey was ridiculed. He was mocked in the tripos verses at Cambridge, as his brother Gabriel's enemy Thomas Nashe, reported, by the comic actor Richard Tarleton, and by the ballad writer William Elderton. Thomas Heth wrote a reply.

In 1590 Harvey published A Theologicall Discovrse of the Lamb of God and his enemies with a dedication to Robert Devereux, 2nd Earl of Essex, The work comprised the substance of sermons which, according to Nashe, had been preached three years earlier. Harvey wrote that the book explained his attitude to the Martin Mar-Prelate controversy. He steered a middle line between the bishops and their opponents, and criticised "poets and writers, who had taken part in the dispute". An anonymous tract Plaine Percevall, the Peacemaker of England, sweetly indevoring with his blunt persuasions to botch up a reconciliation betwixt Mart-on and Mart-other (1590?) supported the Puritan side of the controversy, and made contemptuous mention of the tract entitled The Pappe with a Hatchet ascribed to John Lyly.

Harvey's abuse of men of letters stirred Robert Greene to the attack on Harvey and his brothers Gabriel and John, A Quippe for an Upstart Courtier (1592, not extant). In the literary quarrel which followed between Gabriel Harvey and Nashe, Greene's champion Nashe parodied Richard's Astrological Discourse of 1583 in A Wonderfull, strange, and miraculous Astrologicall Prognostication, 1592. In his Strange Newes of the Intercepting of certain Letters, 1592, Nashe spoke of Richard as "a notable ruffian with his pen". According to Nashe, Harvey lost his benefice through incompetency, and eloped with and married a daughter of Thomas Mead the judge. He may have gone blind, as Nashe alleged.

Publications:

- Mercurius sive lachrymæ in obitum D. Thomæ Smith (printed at the end of Gabriel Harvey's Smithus, 1578).
- An Astrological Discourse upon the great and notable Conjunction of two Superiour Planets, Saturne and Jupiter, which shall happen on the 28 day of April 1583 … with a briefe Declaration of the Effectes which the late Eclipse of the Sunne 1582 is yet hereafter to woorke: written newly by R. H. London, 1583 (two editions), dedicated to John Aylmer, bishop of London.
- Ephemeron sive Pæana: in gratiam propurgatæ reformatæque dialecticæ, London, 1583, dedicated to the Earl of Essex, a Ramist work.
- A Theologicall Discovrse of the Lamb of God and his enemies, 1590.
- Philadelphus, or a Defence of Brutes and the Brutans History, London (by Iohn Wolfe), 1593, dedicated to the Earl of Essex, in which George Buchanan is addressed. It contains the first known use of the word "Anthropology" in English: "Genealogy or issue which they had, Artes which they studied, Actes which they did. This part of History is named Anthropology."

== Notes ==
Attribution

This article incorporates text from a publication now in the public domain: Stephen, Leslie; Lee, Sidney, eds. (1891). "Harvey, Richard". Dictionary of National Biography. Vol. 25. London: Smith, Elder & Co.
