= The Unfortunate Traveller =

1594 novel by Thomas Nashe

The Unfortunate Traveller: or, the Life of Jack Wilton
- Author: Thomas Nashe
- Language: English
- Publication date: 1594

The Unfortunate Traveller: or, the Life of Jack Wilton (originally published as The Unfortunate Traueller: or, The Life of Jacke Wilton) is an English picaresque novel by Thomas Nashe first published in 1594 but set during the reign of Henry VIII (r. 1509-1547). In this adventurous and episodic work, Nashe's protagonist Jack Wilton navigates 16th-century Europe engaging with historical events. The story sees Jack swindle at a military camp, witness a massacre in Münster, and travels with Surrey. They meet literary figures, engage in deceit in Italy, and face various challenges. The narrative explores themes of religion, hypocrisy, and cultural differences. Jack's journey culminates in Italy, where he faces personal and moral dilemmas, ultimately leaving the "Sodom of Italy" with his wife Diamante.

== Synopsis ==
In this rollicking and stylistically daring work of prose fiction, Nashe's protagonist Jack Wilton adventures through the European continent and finds himself swept up in the currents of sixteenth-century history. Episodic in nature, the narrative jumps from place to place and danger to danger. Jack begins his tale among fellow Englishmen at a military encampment, where he swindles his superiors out of alcohol and money, framing others as traitors. Commenting by the way on the grotesque sweating sickness, Jack arrives in Münster, Germany, to observe the massacre of John Leyden's Anabaptist faction by the Emperor and the Duke of Saxony; this brutal episode enables Nashe to reflect on religious hypocrisy, a theme to which he frequently returns.

Following the massacre of the Anabaptists at Munster, Jack Wilton has a number of personal encounters with historical figures of the sixteenth century, many of them important for their literary contributions. Henry Howard, Earl of Surrey functions as a sustained travel partner for Jack, and the two journey to Italy to fulfill the Earl's pledge to defend the honor of his beloved Geraldine in a tournament. Surrey's grandiloquent praise for Geraldine evinces clearly the author's ability to play with literary history, for although the poet was in truth married to Frances Howard, Nashe fashions her into the beloved object of the poet's courtly affections. Surrey and Jack pass through Rotterdam, where they meet both Erasmus and Sir Thomas More, who are at work on their important prose works The Praise of Folly and Utopia. Following this episode, the pair reaches the university city of Wittenberg, which enables Nashe to mock the customs of Renaissance academia, especially its convoluted orations and bizarre gestures and body language. Following the orations, the magician Cornelius Agrippa reveals in an enchanted mirror the image of Surrey's beloved, "weeping on her bed, and resolved all into devout religion for the absence of her love." The image causes Surrey to burst into poetry and spurs him forward with his new page Jack.

Passing into Italy, the land where the remainder of the narrative unfolds, Jack and Surrey exchange identities as a security measure and because the earl means "to take more liberty of behaviour." The two engage in acts of deceit and trickery with pimps, prostitutes, and counterfeiters. Forced to dig themselves out of a succession of plots, the disguised Jack and Surrey assume much of the duplicitous behaviour that Italians were stereotypically known for in Renaissance England. Commenting on the pander Petro de Campo Frego, Jack states that "he planted in us the first Italianate wit that we had." While imprisoned for fraud, Surrey and Jack meet Diamante, who had been falsely accused of adultery and cast out by her husband; Jack takes her up as his romantic companion and financier. All three characters are freed soon enough thanks to an English connection to the famous satirist Pietro Aretino. Nashe, who professed elsewhere his own desires to emulate Aretino's literary style, offers praise for the satirist as "one of the wittiest knaves that ever God made."

Departing from Venice, Surrey and Jack arrive in Florence, the city where Geraldine was born. Surrey is overcome with poetry and speaks a sonnet in honor of her fair room, a moment in which Nashe can slyly mock the overbearing, lovesick verse of contemporary imitators of Petrarch. The copia of Surrey's verse then gives way to a tournament in which the Earl competes for his beloved's fair name, and Nashe offers gratuitous descriptions of the competitors' armor and horses in a manner that recalls printed accounts of early modern masques and other festive spectacles. The most worthy competitor, Surrey emerges from the tournament victorious, but is suddenly called back into England for business matters.

Jack and Diamante then travel to Rome, which Jack admires for its classical ruins (he is less impressed by its religious relics). By this point in time, Jack clearly sticks out as a foreigner and a tourist, "imitat[ing] four or five sundry nations in my attire at once." After praising the marvelous wonders of artificially-engineered gardens and lamenting the gruesome, simultaneous realities of the plague, the protagonist stumbles into one of the most memorable episodes of the narrative. Esdras of Granado and his lackey Bartol the Italian break into the house where he and Diamante are lodging, and Esdras rapes the virtuous matron Heraclide, who commits suicide after an eloquent oration. Jack witnesses the episode "through a cranny of my upper chamber unsealed," and some critics believe this act of voyeurism makes Jack complicit in the act of rape. However it is difficult to see how this idea can be sustained, as Jack is forcibly locked in his chamber, crying out, "Save her, kill me, and I'll ransom her with a thousand duckets!" And while this theory of complicity seems to insinuate that Jack quietly watches the rape like a voyeur, he reacts like a wild animal to "that detestable rape", beating his head against the wall, screaming, and "dar[ing] all the devils in hell . . . to come and fight with me".

Heraclide's husband accuses Jack of the rape, but another English character known as the "Banished Earl" stays Jack's execution. This comes at a slight cost, however; banned from his beloved home country, the Earl rattles off a catalogue of reasons to avoid travel at all costs. In Italy, one only learns "the art of atheism, the art of epicurizing, the art of whoring, the art of poisoning, the art of sodomitry." France gains one only a knowledge of wine and the "French disease," syphilis. In Spain, one only acquires strange clothing. The Dutch excel only in their drinking. Such an admonitory catalogue follows the precepts found in the writings of the Elizabethan education theorist Roger Ascham, who warned his fellow Englishmen about the dangers of Italy and its books.

In spite of the Banished English Earl's suggestions, Jack remains in Italy in search of his beloved Diamante. In so doing, he becomes entangled with and entrapped by Zadok the Jew and Zachary, the Papal Physician, who plan to use Jack as a specimen at the anatomical college. Freed from the brutal pair by the wiles of Juliana, the Pope's courtesan, Jack reunites with Diamante and robs Juliana of her goods, while Zachary flees and Zadok faces a grotesque combination of torture and execution.

The final episode of The Unfortunate Traveller returns to the character of Esdras, who figures now as a victim. At Bologna, Jack and Diamante observe the public execution of Cutwolf, the brother of Esdras's lackey Bartol. Standing before the crowd, Cutwolf delivers a speech recounting his vile actions. Seeking vengeance for his brother's murder, Cutwolf tracked down the villain Esdras, confronted him, and forced him to blaspheme against God and against salvation before discharging a pistol into his mouth, thereby damning his soul eternally in death. Self-righteously, he declares in his own defense before the crowd that "This is the fault that hath called me hither. No true Italian but will honour me for it. Revenge is the glory of arms and the highest performance of valour." In spite of such an oration, Cutwolf joins the ranks of the narrative's brutally-executed characters, and Jack and his newly-wed Diamante flee out of "the Sodom of Italy" back toward the English encampment in France, where the story first began.

== Publication history ==
The Unfortunate Traveller was printed in quarto in 1594 by Thomas Scarlet for Cuthbert Burby. A "Newly corrected and augmented" edition of the text appeared later in the same year by the same publisher. No new editions appeared through the handpress era.

== Modern references ==
In The League of Extraordinary Gentlemen, Sir Jack Wilton (standing in for real-life Elizabethan spymaster Sir Francis Walsingham) was the "M" of the late 16th century. He led a group of special operatives called Prospero's Men shortly after the reign of "Good Queen Gloriana" of England.
