= Richard Lichfield =

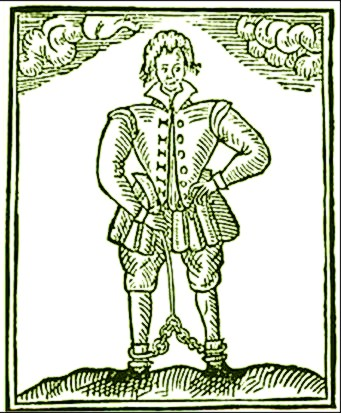
Woodcut depicting Nashe in fetters from Lichfield's The Trimming of Thomas Nashe, Gentleman.

Richard Lichfield (died 1630) was a barber surgeon in Cambridge, England, during the late 16th and early 17th century. In 1597 he wrote a pamphlet sharply criticising the writer Thomas Nashe, which for many years was believed to be the work of Gabriel Harvey.

Although not a member of the academic community Lichfield belonged to the property-owning middle class, and had a local reputation as a humorist. His humour took the form of parodies of learned speeches, complete with phony Latinisms, evidently a popular genre at Cambridge and one in which other barbers are also said to have excelled.

Nashe's pamphlet Have with You to Saffron-Walden (1596) had been dedicated to Lichfield in a provocative and slyly insolent way. After a brief delay, Lichfield answered it with The Trimming of Thomas Nashe, Gentleman, (1597). For many years it was assumed that Harvey himself had adopted the persona of Lichfield and written the reply to Nashe, but the style of the pamphlet is nothing like his and appears quite genuinely to be by Lichfield, and is generally so accepted today. Certainly when Nashe light-heartedly threatened a demolition of the work in Nashes Lenten Stuffe- "...stay till Ester Terme, and then, with the answere to the Trim Tram, I will make you laugh your hearts out" - he does not suggest it is Harvey's.

Lichfield's pamphlet is interesting to literary historians because it gives some biographical details on Nashe which would otherwise not be known, and makes a glancing reference to the rising Cambridge satirist, Joseph Hall.
