= Blue Ventures =

UK conservation charity

Blue Ventures Conservation
- Formation: 2003
- Founder: Dr. Alasdair Harris, Tom Savage, Dr. Robert Conway, Matthew Linnecar
- Purpose: Marine Conservation, Sustainable fisheries, Community health, Education, Aquaculture, Blue carbon, Eco-tourism, Invasive species
- Headquarters: Bristol, UK
- Website: blueventures.org

Blue Ventures is a charity focused on marine conservation. It is based in the UK.

The organization operates in the Indian Ocean, Southeast Asia, and the Caribbean, with sites in Madagascar, Belize, Indonesia, and Timor-Leste. They also manage projects in Comoros, Kenya, Mozambique, and Tanzania.

== Organization ==
Blue Ventures consists of two entities: Blue Ventures Expeditions Ltd (BVE) and Blue Ventures Conservation (BVC). BVC is registered with the Charity Commission for England and Wales and conducts its own fundraising activities.

== History ==
Blue Ventures was co-founded in 2003 by Alasdair Harris, Matthew Linnecar, Dr. Robert Conway, and Tom Savage.

The organization advocates for sustainability of small-scale fishers and promotes fishery management that safeguards marine biodiversity. They have programs that focus on four main areas: fisheries, mangroves (blue forests), aquaculture, and eco-tourism.

Blue Ventures operates field sites in Madagascar, Belize, and Timor-Leste, and collaborates with partner organizations in East Africa and Indonesia.

== Awards ==
Blue Ventures has won a number of awards including;

- WWF Duke of Edinburgh Conservation Award, 2015
- Global Youth Travel Award for Outstanding Volunteer Project, 2015
- Skoll Award for Social Entrepreneurship, 2015
- The St Andrews Prize for the Environment, 2014
- Excellence in Leadership for Family Planning (EXCELL) Award 2013.
- Tusk Conservation Awards - Highly Commended prize 2013.
- SeaWeb Seafood Champion Award 2012 for seafood sustainability.
- The British Youth Travel Awards 2012. Winner in "Best Volunteering Organisation" category.
- The Buckminster Fuller Challenge award in 2011 Buckminster Fuller Challenge, 2011
- Responsible Tourism Awards 2010. Winner in the "Best Volunteering Organisation" category.
- Condé Nast Traveler Environmental Award 2009.
- Equator Prize 2007.
- Skål International Eco-tourism Awards 2006. Winner of the "General Countryside" category.
- United Nations SEED Award (UNDP, UNEP, IUCN) 2005.
