= Tom Savage (painter) =

American painter (born 1953)

Tom Savage (born November 28, 1953) is a contemporary American painter based in California whose work appears in museum collections and has been exhibited in major cities throughout the United States. His abstract paintings and drawings take a historical cue from post-war European automatism and surrealism, and the influence those movements had on abstract expressionism.

== Critical debate ==
The primal, unconscious and disharmonious nature of Savage's technique, which the artist himself has described as the antithesis of that of regionalist painter Thomas Hart Benton, has proven an interpretive challenge for critics.

In his Los Angeles Times review of Savage's 1995 solo exhibition at the Cirrus Gallery in Los Angeles, critic David Pagel described the artist's works as "raw, incoherent, precarious and daring. At the same time, they're confident and desperate, riddled with deep doubts but also profoundly self-assured."

Writing of the same show in the national West Coast contemporary art review Artweek, critic Peter Kosenko characterized Savage's paintings as "abstract and generally impressionistic, but they nonetheless resist placement within the traditions of abstract expressionism as codified by formalist criticism, for they display little of the angst-ridden struggle with paint or the preoccupation with the sublime that often characterize the strategies of the genre."

Critic David DiMichele of the Los Angeles Downtown News, noting Savage's use of unprimed canvas and "thinly applied traceries," wrote that the artist's style is "marked by a pronounced sense of restraint.... Emphatically abstract, his work seeks to preserve something of the initial excitement that occurs when an artist first puts brush to canvas."

Revisiting Savage's work at the August 1996 exhibition Transcendental Meditations at the William Turner Gallery in Venice, California, Los Angeles Times critic David Pagel observed that the artist's "inarticulate markings, crudely painted and scrawled on raw canvas, share more with children's drawings than with any desire to leave this world behind."

== List of major works ==
- On Top of the World - 2004; oil, acrylic and charcoal; 84 in × 72 in (210 cm × 180 cm)
- Someone Should Say Something - 2003; oil and acrylic; 64 1/4 in × 54 1/8 in (163 cm × 137 cm)
- Untitled - 2003; mixed media; 120 in × 96 in (300 cm × 240 cm)
- Rusted Cage - 2000; mixed media; 64 in × 54 in (160 cm × 140 cm)

== Museum collections ==
Tom Savage's work is in the following institutional collections:

- Arizona State University Art Museum, Tempe, Arizona
- De Saisset Museum, Santa Clara University, Santa Clara, California
- Los Angeles County Museum of Art, Los Angeles, California
- Tucson Museum of Art, Tucson, Arizona

== Selected exhibitions ==
Savage's solo exhibitions include:

- 2001: Is Was, Post Gallery, Los Angeles, California
- 2000: Recent Works, Post Gallery, Los Angeles, California
- 1997: Ruth Bachofner Gallery, Santa Monica, California
- 1996: 410 Boyd Street, Los Angeles, California
- 1996: Idyllwild Arts Academy, Idyllwild, California
- 1995: Connecticut College, Joann Toor Cummings Gallery, New London, Connecticut
- 1995: Recent Paintings, Cirrus Gallery, Los Angeles, California
- 1992: University of Montana, Missoula, Montana
- 1991: Shoshana Wayne Gallery, Santa Monica, California
- 1989: Dinnerware Gallery, Tucson, Arizona
- 1988: Concourse Gallery, Bank of America World Headquarters, San Francisco, California
