= Zoeth Skinner Eldredge =

Zoeth Skinner Eldredge (October 13, 1846 – 1915) was an American banker and amateur historian of California.

Eldredge was born in Buffalo, New York. He appears to have self-published at least two books on the local history of San Francisco, California. His two-volume history of San Francisco was reviewed as containing "fairly readable essays" that were "distributed somewhat capriciously between text and notes". The reviewer also notes that "the author has not by any means confined himself to the subject" described by the book's title.

A map printed without attribution in his book The Beginnings of San Francisco in 1912 has been the center of significant controversy among San Francisco history researchers. The map, apparently created by Eldredge, shows the "now vanished freshwater lake" upon whose shores the city was supposedly founded. Later research showed that the lake was confused with another early San Francisco location, and probably never existed, except as a tidal lagoon called Mission Creek.

== Selected works ==
- Works by Zoeth Skinner Eldredge at Project Gutenberg
- The Beginnings of San Francisco from the Expedition of Anza, 1774, to the City Charter of April 15, 1850. Vol. 1. New York: John C. Rankin Company. 1912.
- The Beginnings of San Francisco: From the Expedition of Anza, 1774, to the City Charter of April 15, 1850 : with Biographical and Other Notes. Vol. 2. New York: John C. Rankin Company. 1912.
- Zoeth Skinner Eldredge; Juan Manuel de Ayala (1909). The March of Portolá and the Discovery of the Bay of San Francisco. California Promotion Committee – via gutenberg.org.
- Zoeth Skinner Eldredge; Juan Manuel de Ayala (1909). The March of Portolá and the Discovery of the Bay of San Francisco. California Promotion Committee – via google books.
- History of California: The Rise and Progress of an American State (editor), 5 volumes, New York : The Century History Company, c.1915.
