= Thomas Savage (Shakespeare's trustee) =

- Born: c. 1552
- Died: 1611
- Spouses: two wives, one named Alice
- Issue: Richard Savage four other children
- Father: Jeffry or Geoffrey Savage
- Mother: Jenett or Janet Hesketh

Thomas Savage (c. 1552–1611) of Rufford, Lancashire, was a member of the Worshipful Company of Goldsmiths and one of the ten seacoal-meters in London. Together with William Leveson, he was one of two trustees used by the original shareholders of the Globe Theatre in the allocation of their shares in 1599. He was an associate of the actor and editor of the First Folio, John Heminges, and of John Jackson, both of whom were Shakespeare's trustees in the purchase of the Blackfriars Gatehouse. Savage amassed a considerable fortune, at the time of his death owning five houses in London and an inn called the George.

== Family ==
Thomas Savage, born about 1552 in Rufford, Lancashire, was the son of Jeffry or Geoffrey Savage and Jenett or Janet Hesketh, who according to the parish register were married in the church at Croston on 9 August 1551. Savage may have had a younger brother, Peter Savage, and had at least one sister, as well as a female cousin, the widow of Thomas Hesketh of Rufford.

== Career ==
At some time Savage moved to London, where he lived from about 1580 until his death in 1611 in the parish of St Albans Wood Street. At an unknown date he gained admission to the Worshipful Company of Goldsmiths. The Company records are missing for the date of his admission; however surviving Company records indicate that he took on nine apprentices from the 1580s until his death, and that his son, Richard, was taken on as an apprentice in 1601. According to Hotson, however, he 'no doubt gained most of his income from his office as one of the ten seacoal-meters of London' officials appointed to measure coal brought into the port of London by sea. According to Hotson, he was a 'man of substance', and Honigmann notes that, 'starting with nothing', he 'amassed a very considerable fortune'. At the time of his death Savage owned at least five houses in the City of London, one of which was occupied by the actor and editor of the First Folio, John Heminges (bap. 1566, d.1630), also one of London's seacoal-meters, from whom Savage had purchased it. Another of the houses owned by Savage was in the parish of St Olave Silver Street; Hotson notes that William Shakespeare lodged for a time in Silver Street at the house of the London tire-maker (head-dress-maker) Christopher Mountjoy. After Savage's death, his son, Richard, sold the latter house to John Heminges. Savage also owned an inn called the George in the parish of St Sepulchre, London.

In 1599 Savage, together with William Leveson, was one of two trustees used by William Kempe, Thomas Pope (d.1603), Augustine Phillips (d.1605), John Heminges and William Shakespeare to allocate shareholdings in the Globe Theatre.

Savage was a friend of John Jackson (c.1574–1625) gentleman, of Kingston upon Hull and London, whom Heminges had taken as his deputy in the office of seacoal-meter soon after December 1608. Both Jackson and Heminges were later Shakespeare's trustees in the purchase of the Blackfriars Gatehouse in March 1613. In his will Savage appointed his 'very loving friend, John Jackson', as overseer.

Savage made his last will on 3 October 1611, leaving, among other bequests, £10 to his mother, Janet, a silver spout pot and £8 for a dinner to his fellow members of the Goldsmiths' Company, and forty shillings to the poor of his birthplace, Rufford, in the parish of Croston. According to Honigmann, the opening lines of Savage's will suggest that he held strong religious convictions, and his bequests to the parson and churchwardens of his parish of St Albans, Wood Street were 'unusually generous'. The will was proved 26 October 1611.

== Marriages and issue ==
Savage married two wives and had five children. One of his wives, Alice, had four children by her own two previous marriages, as revealed in a bill of complaint dated 10 September 1605. According to Honigmann, the maiden name of one of Savage's wives may have been Wotton, as in his will he mentions 'my mother-in-law, Mrs Wootton' as well as a 'Mr John Wotton, gentleman', now resident in one of his houses in London.
