= Tom Savage (social entrepreneur) =

British social entrepreneur (born 1979)

- Born: 27 July 1979
- Occupation(s): Social entrepreneur, founder of Blue Ventures and 3Desk

Tom Savage (born 27 July 1979) is a British social entrepreneur, founder of award-winning Blue Ventures and 3Desk.

In 2007, Savage won the Edge Upstart Young Social Entrepreneur of the Year Award and was interviewed in The Guardian. Savage was also cited, as an inspiration to Prime Minister Gordon Brown in his book Britain's Everyday Heroes.

== Education ==
Tom Savage graduated with a degree in Business from the University of Edinburgh. He has a postgraduate degree in business from the University of Oxford.

== Career ==
Tom Savage began his career as an analyst at UBS Warburg, now known as UBS.
