= Thomas Savage (historian) =

Acting Consul General of the United States at Havana
- In office by 1867

Personal details
- Born: 27 August 1823 Havana, Cuba
- Occupation: Consular officer, translator, archivist, oral historian

Thomas Savage (born 27 August 1823) was a Havana-born American consular officer, translator, archivist and oral historian. After more than twenty years in the United States consulate at Havana, where he served through the American Civil War and was acting consul general by 1867, he joined the library of the historian Hubert Howe Bancroft in San Francisco in 1873. He became Bancroft's chief authority on Spanish-American material, wrote several volumes of Bancroft's Works that were published under Bancroft's name, and in 1876 and 1877 directed the abstracting of the government archive of Spanish and Mexican Alta California into the sixty-three bound volumes now held at the Bancroft Library as the Archives of California (BANC MSS C-A). He did not do the copying alone: he directed a workshop of Spanish-speaking clerks, and the volumes are in several hands. After the originals were destroyed in the 1906 San Francisco earthquake and fire, those volumes became the principal surviving record of the civil government of Spanish and Mexican California, so that for most of the period what Savage's crew chose to copy or to summarise is what now survives of the archive.

== Early life ==
According to Bancroft, who published a biographical sketch of him in 1890, Savage was born in Havana on 27 August 1823 to New England parents, his father a merchant whose ancestors were among the early settlers of Boston. He grew up speaking Spanish and French as readily as English, was schooled in Havana in the Latin classics and mathematics, and began preparing for the law before ill health, which troubled him all his life, obliged him to give it up. His father died while he was young. He married in 1850, and Bancroft records that he buried thirteen members of his family within ten years.

== Consular service in Havana ==
After a few years as a bookkeeper in a mercantile house, Savage entered the United States consulate at Havana as a clerk under the consul Robert B. Campbell, and by Bancroft's account served twenty-one and a half years, at times as deputy and at times in charge of the office. Harry Clark gives the period as twenty-one years. The title page of Savage's own 1889 Manual describes him as having been "for twenty years in the United States consular service in Spanish-American countries".

His despatches to Secretary of State William H. Seward were printed in the State Department's published diplomatic correspondence, which records him writing from the consulate general at Havana from 1861 onward. He remained at the post through the Civil War; Bancroft states that for twenty months, while blockade-running between Havana and southern ports was constant, Savage had sole charge of the consulate, and that although his chief was a secessionist Savage remained loyal to the Union government. In November 1865 he reported to Seward on Africans recently landed on the coast of Cuba. By 1867 Seward referred to him as the acting consul general of the United States at Havana, and in that capacity Savage telegraphed the department on 19 November 1867 that the remains of the Emperor Maximilian had been surrendered. Bancroft also credits him with uncovering a plot, formed at Havana in 1864, to seize the San Francisco treasure steamer by first capturing the Panama Railway Company's steamer Guatemala.

Savage retired from the consulate on 31 December 1867. He passed most of 1868 in the United States, then went to Panama, where he edited the Spanish section of the Star and Herald and for a time acted as consul for Guatemala. He married his second wife at Panama in 1870, and afterwards lived in San Salvador, where he taught and wrote for the press before being appointed United States consul, and then in Guatemala, where he edited a paper for some eighteen months.

== Bancroft's library ==
Savage arrived in San Francisco on 26 March 1873 and entered Bancroft's library four months later. Clark describes him as "a master of the Spanish language" who became Bancroft's main authority on Spanish-American affairs. Bancroft wrote that "For many years Mr Savage was my main reliance on Spanish-American affairs", and that he rose to direct the library detail and later to the librarianship.

Beyond his research work, Savage was an author of the Works published under Bancroft's name. By Clark's account he wrote Central America volume II, material amounting to two further volumes in Central America volume III and Mexico volumes III to VI, miscellaneous other volumes, and an undetermined portion of California Pastoral; Clark notes that none of the assistants who contributed to the Works made conspicuous attempts to gain public recognition. Savage, Alfred Bates and David Sessions also wrote many of the biographies in Bancroft's Chronicles of the Builders, and the manuscripts for them, many identified as being in one or another assistant's hand, survive at the Bancroft Library.

== The Archives of California ==
Savage began work on 15 May 1876, spending the first month making extracts from the archive of Archbishop Joseph Sadoc Alemany, who allowed extracts but would not let papers leave his house, before moving to the Spanish and Mexican records held by the office of the United States Surveyor General in San Francisco. Those records had been gathered from across the state in 1851 and were, as Clark puts it, "a jumble" when Savage began. The work was not his alone. Clark describes him directing a crew of Bancroft employees, and Savage later named Emilio Piña, Rosendo V. Corona and Vicente P. Gómez as his three best assistants; the sixty-three volumes are consequently in several hands, with Savage in charge of the operation rather than the sole copyist. He also copied mission archives at San Juan Capistrano, San Gabriel and Santa Cruz.

Sources differ on the size and duration of the operation. Savage's own report describes ten to twelve assistants over about ten months, a figure Clark follows, while Bowman and Nunis, following Bancroft's memoir, give fifteen clerks working a full year. The work was finished by about March 1877, in sixty-three volumes.

The crew did not copy the archive in full. In Savage's words, the substance of a useful document "had to be carefully extracted, and written down concisely tho' clearly," while anything sufficiently important "was taken down verbatim et literatim," and material judged of no practical use was left out. Savage put the cost of the work at nearly $10,000 and estimated that full copying would have cost $35,000 to $40,000; Bancroft put the cost at $18,000.

== Dictations ==
Between October 1877 and June 1878 Savage took down about fifty oral narratives from Californio men and women, among them Antonio Coronel, Pío Pico and Angustias de la Guerra Ord, as one of three Bancroft interviewers alongside Enrique Cerruti and Vicente P. Gómez. Clark records him taking dictations at Salinas, San José, Los Angeles, San Diego and other cities. He was skeptical of testimony taken without documents, writing that most of his informants could not furnish dates and that their accounts rested on "hearsay, rumor, or tradition transmitted to them by word of mouth."

== Report of Labors ==
In September 1879 Savage wrote a "Report of Labors in Archives and Procuring Material for History of California, 1876–9" (BANC MSS C-E 191), his own account of how the copies were made. It remained unpublished until 2006, when Rose Marie Beebe and Robert M. Senkewicz printed it as an appendix to Testimonios.

== Assessment ==
Because the originals burned in 1906, historians have treated Savage's abstracts with a mixture of gratitude and caution. Bowman concluded that "the world is the richer for its having been done at all," since the fire destroyed the originals and no other users made abstracts or copies beyond those published in their own works. The result is that Savage's volumes stand in place of the archive itself for much of the Spanish and Mexican period, and the editorial decisions taken in his workshop in 1876 and 1877, over what to copy in full, what to condense and what to leave out, govern what later historians have been able to read. The ethnohistorian Randall Milliken, comparing an abstract against a surviving original, warned that the volumes "are neither originals nor true copies" but paraphrases, in which details about Indian people were often omitted.

== Surviving papers ==
Savage's work survives at the Bancroft Library at the University of California, Berkeley: the copies and abstracts as the sixty-three volumes of the Archives of California, BANC MSS C-A 1 to 63; his "Report of Labors" as BANC MSS C-E 191; and the narratives he took down from Californio informants among the library's manuscript dictations. The contents of the sixty-three volumes have been catalogued item by item in Archives of California: A Documentary Calendar of the Savage Transcripts, an online index that describes the documents in C-A 1 to 63 and links each to its page in the digitised manuscripts.

== Works ==
- Manual of Industrial and Commercial Intercourse between the United States and Spanish America (San Francisco: The Bancroft Company, 1889; further edition 1890), written at Bancroft's suggestion.
- "Report of Labors in Archives and Procuring Material for History of California, 1876–9" (1879), manuscript, Bancroft Library, BANC MSS C-E 191; first printed in 2006 as an appendix to Beebe and Senkewicz, Testimonios, pp. 341–383.
- Central America volume II, and substantial parts of Central America volume III and Mexico volumes III to VI, in The Works of Hubert Howe Bancroft, published under Bancroft's name.
