= Thomas Heth =

English mathematician

Thomas Heth or Heath (fl. 1583) was an English mathematician.

== Life ==
Born in London, Heth was admitted probationer fellow of All Souls College, Oxford, in 1567, and proceeded B.A. 1569, and M.A. 1573. He had a reputation for his knowledge of astronomy and physics, and was a friend of John Dee and Thomas Allen.

== Works ==
Heth denounced the astrological predictions of Richard Harvey in Manifest and Apparent Confutation of an Astrological Discourse lately published to the discomfort (without cause) of the weak and simple sort. With the Confutation was bound up his Brief Prognostication or Astronomical Prediction of the Conjunction of the two superiour Planets Saturn and Jupiter, which shall be in 1583, April 29, London, 1583. Both parts were dedicated to Sir George Carey.

== Notes ==
Attribution

This article incorporates text from a publication now in the public domain: Stephen, Leslie; Lee, Sidney, eds. (1891). "Heath, Thomas". Dictionary of National Biography. Vol. 25. London: Smith, Elder & Co.
