= Pierce Penniless =

1592 pamphlet by Thomas Nashe

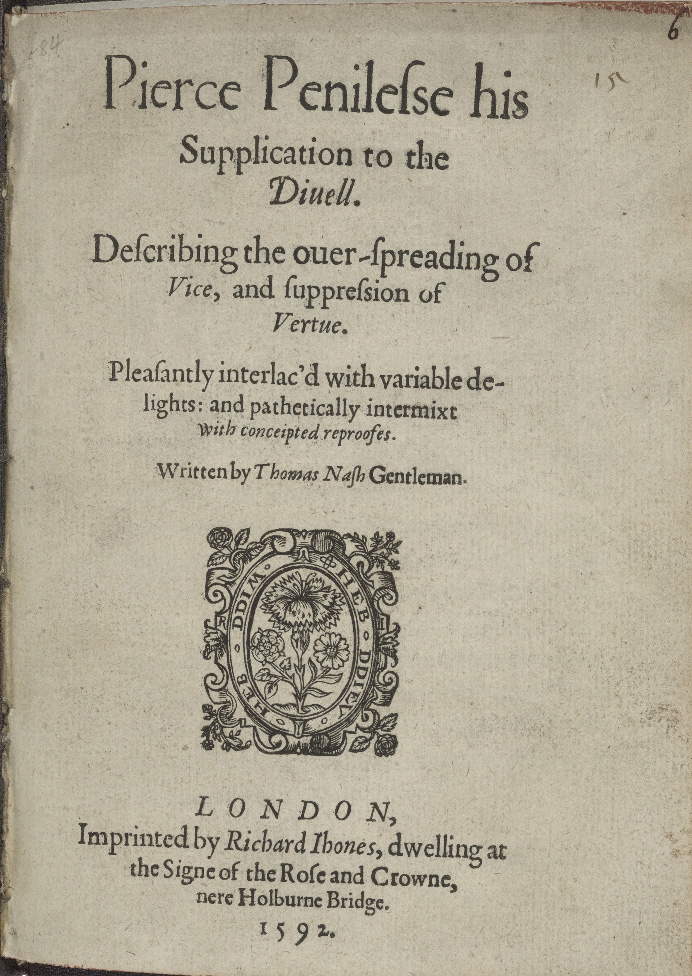
Title page of "Pierce Penilesse his Supplication to the Diuell" by Thomas Nash

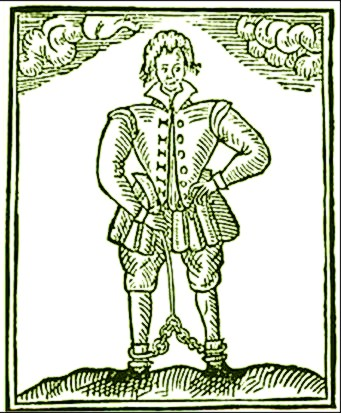
Engraving of Thomas Nashe

Pierce Penniless his Supplication to the Divell is a tall tale, or a prose satire, written by Thomas Nashe and published in London in 1592. It was among the most popular of the Elizabethan pamphlets. It was reprinted in 1593 and 1595, and in 1594 was translated into French. It is written from the point of view of Pierce, a man who has not met with good fortune, who now bitterly complains of the world's wickedness, and addresses his complaints to the devil. At times the identity of Pierce seems to conflate with Nashe's own. But Nashe also portrays Pierce as something of an arrogant and prodigal fool. The story is told in a style that is complex, witty, fulminating, extemporaneous, digressive, anecdotal, filled with wicked descriptions, and peppered with newly minted words and Latin phrases. The satire can be mocking and bitingly sharp, and at times Nashe’s style seems to relish its own obscurity.

== Elizabethan pamphlets ==
Pierce Penniless was printed and published as one of the many pamphlets or short quarto books that provided lively material to the reading public. Printed pamphlets had been a popular and longstanding tradition, but in London in the late 16th century, with the urban population booming, and literacy becoming widespread, they flourished. The content of these pamphlets often tended to be scandalous or scurrilous, but they contained a variety of material: Satires, war-of-words, anonymous attacks, topical issues, poetry, fiction, etc. Shakespeare, in the dedication to his poem The Rape of Lucrece refers to its quarto publication as a pamphlet.

== The plague ==
Through pamphlets, playwrights could write and be published in those times when the plague had closed the theatres. Such was the case with Shakespeare's Venus and Adonis and Nashe's Pierce Penniless, which were both written and published when the theatres were closed from 1592–1593. As Nashe says in his introductory "Private Epistle of the Author to the Printer", the first edition of Pierce Penniless was published in London, while Nashe was out of town, because "the fear of infection detained me with my Lord [his patron Lord Strange] in the country." The plague is an underlying motive for the story itself—the seven deadly sins that Nashe's tale describes were said at the time to be the cause of the disease. Indeed, the last words that Pierce addresses to the Devil in his supplication express the wish that certain souls will be accepted into Hell, and thus will "not let our air be contaminated with their sixpenny damnation any longer".

== Pamphlet war ==
Nashe participated in the Martin Marprelate controversy, by pseudonymously responding to attacks against the Church of England launched by a circle of Puritan writers, who waged a pamphlet war and wrote under the pseudonym Martin Marprelate.

The text of Pierce Penniless contains an attack on both Richard Harvey, the astrologer, and on his fellow Marinists Near the midpoint of the story, Nashe's salvo begins:

Gentlemen, I am sure you have heard of a ridiculous ass that ... wrote an absurd Astrological Discourse ... I have read over thy sheepish discourse of The Lamb Of God And His Enemies, and ... I could not refrain, but bequeath it to the privy, leaf by leaf as I read it, it was so ugly, dorbellical, and lumpish.

== The preface ==
In the "Private Epistle of the Author to the Printer", which prefaces the second edition of Pierce Penniless, Nashe refers to another pamphlet entitled Greene's Groats-Worth of Wit (1592), which contains this well known attack on William Shakespeare:

... there is an upstart crow, beautified with our feathers, that with his tiger's heart wrapped in a player's hide supposes he is as well able to bombast out a blank verse as the best of you, and being an absolute Johannes factotum is in his own conceit the only Shake-scene in a country

From the moment Greene's Groats-Worth of Wit was published, people disbelieved that Robert Greene actually wrote it, let alone wrote it from his deathbed, as is purported in the pamphlet. But the two who are then suspected of writing it, Thomas Nashe and Henry Chettle, each denied being the author. Among other reasons for considering that Nashe may be the author is Nashe's denial, which at first glance seems adamant, but is immediately followed by a kind of rueful confession that seems to have left a door open for interpretation:

... a scald trivial lying pamphlet called Greene's Groatsworth of Wit is given out to be of my doing. God never have care of my soul, but utterly renounce me, if the least word or syllable in it proceeded from my pen, or if I were any way privy to the writing or printing of it. I am grown at length to see into the vanity of the world more than ever I did, and now I condemn myself for nothing so much as playing the dolt in print.

Nashe's character, "Pierce", occasionally has some harsh words for his unnamed fellow authors, which has led to speculation about who they might be. Nashe refers to them variously as sonnet-composing "upstarts", who are not as well-born or as well educated as himself, who have little Latin, but who are enjoying popular success in the theatre. Nashe then, in the "Private Epistle of the Author to the Printer", threatens anyone who might suggest his satire has particular victims: "Let the interpreter beware," he says, "...they shall know that I live as their evil angel to haunt them world without end." However, Nashe’s satire would have no point unless it could be seen to be striking an actual target. Nashe ends his epistle to his printer by mentioning that he would be available "... before the third impression [to] come and alter whatsoever may be offensive to any man."

== The story ==
The story of Pierce Penniless is told by Pierce himself, who is a scholar, author, and poet. He begins by bewailing his own lack of good fortune, saying " ... have I more wit than all these (thought I to myself)? Am I better born, am I better brought up, yea, and better favoured, and yet am I a beggar?" He sees no solution and finds that wickedness prevails. "Divines and dying men may talk of hell," he says, "but in my heart her several torments dwell."

Having heard that a person might pawn his soul to the Devil for a thousand pounds, Pierce decides to seek a solution in that direction and appeal to the Devil, reasoning that if the Devil were to remove certain souls from the land of the living and recruit them into his domain where they belong, it would liberate and make available the wealth that they've been hoarding: Gold—that "mighty controller of fortune and imperious subverter of destiny, delicious gold, the poor man's god, and idol of princes."

Pierce searches for the Devil, first in Westminster, then in the Exchange, and then in St. Paul’s, where he finds a Knight of the Post, (i.e. whipping post) – a term for a professional perjurer. This man claims he can get a message to the devil. Pierce hands him what he has written, a supplication addressed to "The Prince of Darkness" from Pierce Penniless who "wisheth increase of damnation and increase of malediction eternal."

The supplication is based on the medieval theme of the Seven Deadly Sins, and enumerates each vice one after the other: Greed, and his wife Dame Niggardise; Pride and his mistress, Lady Swine-Snout; gluttony; sloth; etc.

Each vice is personified in the manner of a prosopopoeia, and provides an opportunity for the story to introduce various sinners, who are described with rich detail—as though they are costumed to appear onstage.

The section devoted to the sin of "sloth" contains Nashe's "defense of Playes", which finds that plays are not slothful, but virtuous. Pierce especially appreciates historical plays and gives Shakespeare's Henry VI, Part 1 as an example. As Pierce says:

How would it have joyed brave Talbot (the terror of the French) to think that after he had lien two hundred years in his tomb, he should triumph again on the stage, and have his bones new embalmed with the tears of ten thousand spectators at least (at several times), who, in the tragedian that represents his person, imagine they behold him fresh bleeding.

A notable passage occurs when Nashe describes the various types of drunkards one encounters in pubs and taverns.

Pierce signs this supplication: "Your devilship's bounden execrator, Pierce Penilesse". He then asks the Knight of the Post a question that was of interest to Elizabethan Londoners: What is the nature of Hell and the Devil?

The Knight begins to answer, but digresses into a story: the allegory of the wickedness of the bear, "a right earthly devil", which is seen as a reference to the Earl of Leicester. Nashe's tale ends abruptly with the praises of a nobleman named Amuntas, who is believed to be the Earl of Southampton.
