= Have with You to Saffron-Walden =

Pamphlet

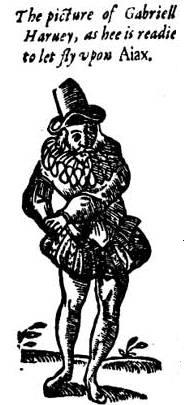
Caricature of Harvey from the pamphlet, entitled "picture of Gabriel Harvey as he is ready to let fly upon Ajax". This depicts him rushing to the toilet at the thought of Nashe's publication. "Ajax" is a common Elizabethan pun on "a jacks", slang for toilet.

"Have with You to Saffron-Walden, or, Gabriell Harveys Hunt Is Up" is the title of a pamphlet written by Thomas Nashe and published in London in late 1596 by John Danter. The work is Nashe's final shot in his four-year literary feud with Dr. Gabriel Harvey. It consists of title-page, epistle dedicatory, an address to "all Christian Readers", and a lengthy dialogue between five characters.

The title page makes it clear to the reader that the purpose of the pamphlet is to attack Gabriel Harvey, whose 1593 pamphlet vilifying Nashe had until then gone unanswered. Saffron Walden was Harvey's birthplace and he seems to have withdrawn there to live sometime in 1593.

The epistle dedicatory is to Richard Lichfield, a barber-surgeon of Cambridge noted for his ability to make humorous, mock-academic orations. Nashe, who clearly knows something of Lichfield but may not have known him personally, at first addresses him in hyperbolic terms of exaggerated respect. The language chosen for the dedication is probably in imitation of a verbose and comically pedantic style sometimes used by Lichfield, and certain other barber-surgeons at Cambridge, for entertainment. Throughout the epistle Nashe seems to be appealing to Lichfield to join him in attacking Harvey and his brothers, though the tone is edgy and it is unclear whether Nashe seriously expects a favourable response.

In his address To all Christian Readers Nashe explains away his delay in answering Harvey's previous attack on him and briefly sketches his intentions for the ensuing pamphlet. In excuse for his delay, he complains that such "bitter-sauced invectives" do not pay well; that he is answering now not out of hatred but because Harvey's supporters have begun to claim his silence means he is unable to answer; and adds that he set Harvey's previous attack on one side for two years to allow himself to deal with it more dispassionately. In outlining the form of his pamphlet, he explains it will be "in the nature of a Dialogue" between four persons who are to discuss the offence Harvey has given Nashe by his attack and, like seconds in a duel, advise him on how to proceed. Though he gives the four persons comical pseudonyms Nashe specifically claims they are all actual men, describes them with some particularity and adds they have "dealt with me in the same manner that here I shadow".

The dialogue consists of the four friends meeting Nashe in Blackfriars, asking him why he has failed to answer Harvey, and warning him that his reputation is suffering in consequence. Nashe says he has written an answer and offers to read them part of his reply. What ensues is Nashe's detailed critique of Harvey's pamphlet attacking him, with frequent interruptions from the four others deriding the doctor, his style, his past, his pretensions to scholarship, his family background and his supporters, especially one anonymous gentlewoman. A satirical mock-biography of Harvey is also inserted, a lengthy passage which Nashe claims to have written some time earlier.

== Significance ==
The pamphlet contains the earliest known reference to the line Fee-fi-fo-fum, but Nashe mentions that the rhyme was already old and its origins obscure at the time of writing. It also contains the earliest known reference to "If the worst come to the worst", origin of the clause "If worst comes to worst."
