= Gabriel Harvey =

English author (c. 1552/3 – 1631)

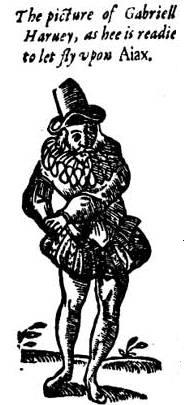
This contemporary woodcut from Nashe's Have with You to Saffron-Walden depicts Gabriel Harvey "ready to let fly upon Ajax", a play on the name of the Greek warrior Ajax and the word 'jakes' (toilet).

Gabriel Harvey (1545 – 11 February 1631) was an English writer. Harvey was a notable scholar, whose reputation suffered from his quarrel with Thomas Nashe. Henry Morley, writing in the Fortnightly Review (March 1869), has argued that Harvey's Latin works demonstrate that he was distinguished by qualities very different from the pedantry and conceit usually associated with his name.

== Family ==
Gabriel Harvey was the eldest son of John Harvey (d.1593), a yeoman farmer and master ropemaker from Saffron Walden, Essex, and his wife, Alice (d.1613). He had two younger brothers, Richard and John (d. July 1592), and a sister, Mercy.

== Education ==
Harvey received his early education at the town's grammar school, and matriculated at Christ's College, Cambridge, in 1566. In 1570 he was elected fellow of Pembroke Hall. Here he formed a friendship with Edmund Spenser (1552-1599), who may have been his pupil.

== Promotion of hexameter verse ==
Harvey wished to be "epitaphed as the Inventour of the English Hexameter," and was a prime mover in a literary clique known as the Areopagus which attempted to impose the Latin rules of quantity on English verse. In a letter to Edmund Spenser, whom he playfully addresses as "M. Immerito," Harvey conveys how Edward Dyer and Philip Sidney (1554-1586) are of great help in forwarding the reputation of "our new famous enterprise for the exchanging of Barbarous and Balductum Rymes with Artificial Verses."

This letter goes on to praise Spenser through a tepid appreciation of the Faerie Queene which Harvey had been given in search of his opinion. He gives examples of English hexameters illustrative of the principles enunciated in the correspondence. The opening lines--"What might I call this Tree? A Laurell? O bonny Laurell Needes to thy bowes will I bow this knee, and vayle my bonetto"—provide a fair sample of the success Harvey's metrical experiments attained that were unfortunately an easy mark for the wit of Thomas Nashe.

The latter would comment in Strange Newes how Harvey "goes twitching and hopping in our language like a man running upon quagmires, up the hill in one syllable, and down the dale in another." To Nashe's amusement it is all too easy to mimic Harvey as he does, for instance, through the following mocking couplet:

"But ah ! what news do you hear of that good Gabriel Huff-Snuff,
Known to the world for a fool, and clapped in the Fleet for a rhymer?"

In spite of such criticism Harvey returned the favours he had received from Spenser. For a time their influence upon one another grew, but this began to wane although their friendship endured. As an indication of their mutual respect Harvey accepts his characterization as the "Hobbinoll" in Spencer's The Shepheardes Calender, and so into his mouth is put the song in the fourth eclogue in praise of Eliza. If Harvey was the author of the verses "To the Learned Shepheard," signed "Hobbinoll" and prefixed to the Faerie Queene then he was a poet.

Harvey's genuine friendship to Spenser shows the best side of his benevolent character, although at times this appeared uncompromisingly quarrelsome to the world in general. In 1573, for instance, such was the bad feeling against Harvey in his college that this led to a delay of three months before his fellows would agree to grant him the necessary grace for his MA degree.

== Career ==
Undaunted, Harvey became reader in rhetoric in about 1576. He followed up this achievement in 1578, on the occasion of Queen Elizabeth's visit to Sir Thomas Smith at Audley End House, when he was appointed to publicly dispute before her through a demonstration of his rhetorical skills. The following year he wrote to his friend Spenser complaining of the unauthorized publication of satirical verses of his which were supposed to reflect on high personages. This threatened seriously to injure his career.

In 1583 he became junior proctor of Cambridge University, and in 1585 was elected master of Trinity Hall, of which he had been a fellow since 1578. However, the appointment appears to have been quashed at court. He was a protégé of Robert Dudley, Earl of Leicester, to whom he introduced Spenser, and this connection may also account for his friendship with Philip Sidney. Yet in spite of patronage, a second application for the mastership of Trinity Hall failed in 1598.

In 1585 Harvey received the degree of D.C.L. from the University of Oxford, and from that time onwards he is found practising at the bar in London, although he was soon faced with another impending challenge. His brother, Richard Harvey, had taken part in the Martin Marprelate controversy, and had given offence to Robert Greene by contemptuous references to him and his fellow wits. Greene retorted by inserting a few lines in the first edition of his A Quip for an Upstart Courtier containing scathing remarks on the four Harvey brothers, thereby drawing attention, among other things, to the fact that they were the sons of a ropemaker.

In 1599 Archbishop Whitgift made a raid on contemporary satire in general. Amidst a wild tirade he orchestrated the destruction of books comprising tracts of Harvey and Nashe. These were callously destroyed. It was even forbidden to reprint them. Hence, Harvey spent the last years of his life in retirement in Saffron Walden, dying there on 7 February 1631, perhaps with a sign of lament for the ills directed against him.

The Letter-Book of Gabriel Harvey, AD, 1573–80 (1884, ed. E J L Scott, Camden Society), contains rough drafts of the correspondence Harvey had with his friend Spenser. These letters throw light upon the disputes at Pembroke Hall. They are also an example of their extraordinary correspondence that relates to the pursuit of Harvey's sister Mercy by a young nobleman. Furthermore, a copy of Quintilian (1542), in the British Museum, appears extensively annotated by Harvey.

As a wordsmith Harvey has been credited with the coining or first use of the word "jovial" (derived from the Latin for "pertaining to Jove or Jupiter"), circa 1590. He has also been credited as well with the words "conscious", "extensively", "idiom", "notoriety" and "rascality". This claim is supported by the criticism of his rival Thomas Nashe. The latter cites Harvey as the creator of these words, but expresses an undue amount of hostility against them, erroneously predicting how Mr. Harvey's words will not stand the test of time.

The Etymologist Robert Hendrickson also cites Harvey's hand in creating these words in his book The Facts on File Encyclopedia of Word and Phrase Origins. At least the comments of this work were more favourable, helping to secure Harvey's place within the unfolding dynamic attributed to etymology.

== Feud with Nashe ==
After Robert Greene's death Harvey published Foure Letters and certaine Sonnets (1592), in which he revealed the miserable details of Greene's later years. Nashe settled his personal score with the Harvey brothers in Strange Newes (1593). Harvey rebutted the personal charges made by Nashe against him and his family and so offered a retort in Pierce's supererogation, or a New Prayse of the Old Asse (1593).

In a religious work, Christs Teares over Jerusalem (1593) Nashe made a full apology to Harvey, who however resumed the controversy in a New Letter of Notable Contents (1593). It is thought that Harvey probably didn't see Nashe's apology in print as he began writing the New Letter of Notable Contents. However, he knew something along the lines of an apology had been rumoured. Yet still he stubbornly refused to take reports of Nashe's change of heart at face value - at least until he had the proof in black and white:

"Till a public injury be publicly confessed, and print confuted in print, I am one of St. Thomas' disciples, not over prest to believe..."

This certainly sounds as if Harvey had simply not seen a copy of Christs Teares at the time of his writing of the New Letter. In the meantime Nashe dramatically withdrew his apology in a new edition (1595) of Christes Teares. Harvey, he claimed, had hinted at wanting a reconciliation in the form of a public apology, but, he added, as soon as he offered this he was made to look a fool for his pains:

"Impious Gabriel Harvey, the vowed enemy to all vows and protestations, plucking on with a private slavish submission a general public reconciliation, hath with a cunning ambuscado of confiscated idle oaths, welnear betrayed me to infamy eternal (his own proper chair of torment in hell). I can say no more but the devil and he be no men of their words."

It was nearly two years before Nashe replied to Harvey's New Letter. When hearing that Harvey had boasted of victory, he produced the most biting satire of the series in Have with You to Saffron-Walden (1596). Harvey never responded. Later Richard Lichfield of Cambridge attacked Nashe in The Trimming of Thomas Nashe Gentleman (1597). He signed his work "by the high-titled patron Don Richardo de Medico campo", a play on his name (i.e. "leech-field"). This work was formerly attributed to Harvey.

== Editions and commentary ==
His complete works were edited by Grosart with a Memorial Introduction for the Huth Library (1884–1885). See also Isaac Disraeli, on "Literary Ridicule," in Calamities of Authors (volume 2); Thomas Warton's History of English Poetry (ed. William Hazlitt, 1871); John Payne Collier's Bibliographical and Critical Account of the Rarest Books in the English Language (1865), and the Works of Thomas Nashe. There is a modern edition of Harvey's pamphlets with Thomas Nashe prepared as a PhD thesis by Peter Brynmor Roberts at the University of Cardiff (2010). A number of Harvey's annotated books have been digitalised as part of the 'Archaeology of Reading in Early Modern Europe' project.

== Latin works ==
- Ciceronianus (1577)
- Gabrielis Harveii rhetor, vel duorum dierum oratio de natura, arte et exercitatione rhetorica (1577)
- Smithus, vel Musarum lachrymae (1578), in honour of Sir Thomas Smith
- Gabrielis Harveii gratulationum Valdensium libri quatuor, written on the occasion of the queen's visit to Audley End (1578)
