= Edward M. White =

American author and academic (born 1933)

Edward Michael White (born 16 August, 1933) is an American author and professor at California State University San Bernardino and the University of Arizona. Most of his work falls in the genre of adult non-fiction and literary criticism. White is most notable for his reflection on writing assessment in the United States as well as designing the first-year English Composition 1 Massive Open Online Course (MOOC). He also heavily emphasized the value of holistic scoring and the importance that writing professors design and have input in their own exams.

White's contribution to the field of writing studies was honored through writing scholars Norbert Elliot and Les Perelman, who edited Writing Assessment in the 21st Century: Essays in Honor of Edward M. White. This book is divided in four parts with 27 essays in hopes to pay tribute to the work that Edward M. White has done while decreasing the gap between the writing assessment community and the educational measurement community.

== Career ==
=== Writing assessment ===
White spent 25 years reviewing the United States methodology of testing. His goal was to decrease the prevalence of multiple choice tests and instead develop writing assessments that meet the wants of four different categories of people. These four categories of people include writing teachers, students, testing organizations, and researchers. White believed writing teachers typically want a writing assessment that understands the interconnectedness of writing and teaching of it while also supporting the work that teachers do in the classroom. Additionally, researchers generally want a writing assessment that is fair and equitable while testing organizations want a writing assessment that easily produces a score at a low cost. Lastly, White argues that students, especially marginalized communities, want an assessment that makes writing more digestible to understand while focusing on both critical thinking and creativity. Contrary to the opinions of writing scholars such as Peter Elbow, White has defended the use of timed essay testing as an effective and practical method of writing assessment.

=== MOOC ===
Edward M. White as well as Denise K. Comer helped design and deploy MOOC for English Composition 1. MOOCs increase education for many people by decreasing the cost of higher education, allowing more people to access information. Opponents of MOOC suggest that MOOC lacks connection between professors and students that typical in-person courses offer. White and Comer argue that writing assessments can be adapted into the MOOC and can provide benefits to many students.

=== College writing programs ===
On multiple occasions, White worked as a consultant for matters relating to writing programs. He was a consultant for the chancellor's office of the California State University system, and he also worked as a consultant evaluator service co-director for the Council of Writing Program Administrators. White has testified in front of Californian legeslators for matters relating to CSU writing programs. White has published multiple books regarding college writing programs. In his 1989 book Developing Successful Writing Programs, White analyzes six major research studies regarding college composition programs and argues that an administrator that is knowledgeable in the subject is necessary for a successful writing program. He also argues that institutional and educational goals need to be balanced in order to create good testing programs. White also covers the topic of writing program administration in the book Very Like a Whale, which he co-wrote with Norbert Elliot and Irvin Peckham.

== Awards ==
In 2011, Edward M. White won the CCCC Exemplar Award.
