= Asao B. Inoue =

Japanese American academic (born 1970)

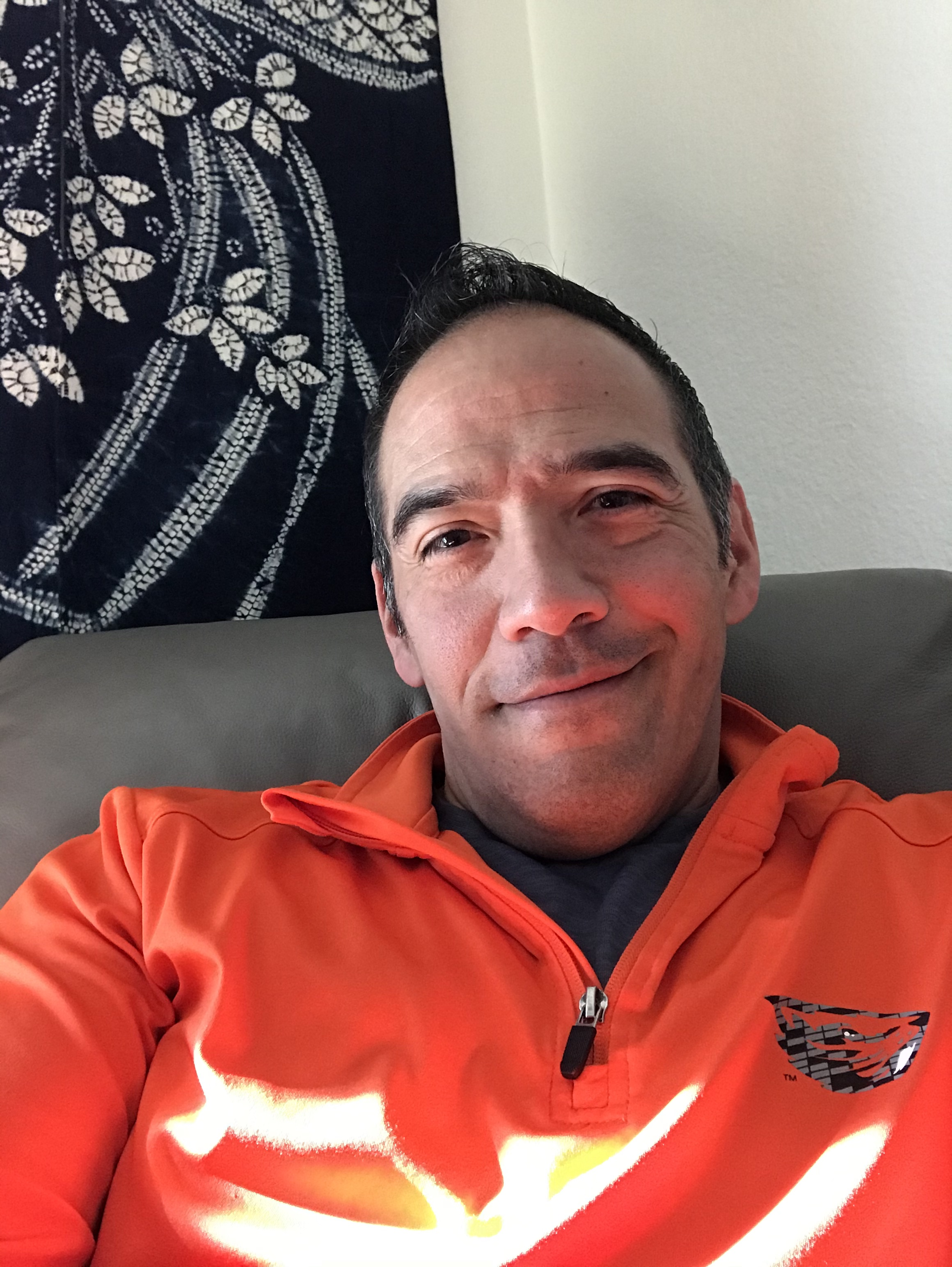
- Asao B. Inoue
- Born: 1970 (age 55–56); Inglewood, California, U.S.
- Known for: anti-racist writing assessment

Academic background
- Education: Washington State University
- Thesis: The Epistemology of Racism and Community-Based Assessment Practice (2005)
- Doctoral advisor: Victor Villanueva

Academic work
- Institutions: Arizona State University
- Main interests: Race; Social Justice; Composition studies
- Website: Arizona State University faculty profile

Asao B. Inoue (born 1970) is a Japanese American academic writer and professor of rhetoric and composition in the College of Integrative Sciences and Arts at Arizona State University whose research and teaching focus on anti-racist writing assessment. Inoue has written extensively on the subject of contract grading.

In 2019, Inoue was elected the Conference on College Composition and Communication (CCCC) Chair. He delivered the keynote presentation for the 2019 CCCC Annual Convention, entitled "How Do We Language So People Stop Killing Each Other, Or What Do We Do About White Language Supremacy?" Inoue is the recipient of multiple disciplinary and institutional academic awards, including the 2017 CCCC Outstanding Book Award, the 2017 Council of Writing Program Administrators (CWPA) Best Book Award, and the 2012 Provost's Award for Teaching Excellence at California State University, Fresno.

== Biography ==
=== Early life and education ===
Inoue attended elementary school in North Las Vegas. He received his B.A. in English Literature with a minor in writing studies from Oregon State University (OSU). He also received his M.A from OSU. He went on to receive his PhD at Washington State University.

=== Teaching career ===
Inoue worked at Chemeketa Community College in a tenure-track position, before deciding to pursue his PhD at Washington State University. In the early to mid 2010s, Asao worked at California State University, Fresno as an associate professor, where he served as the Special Assistant to the Provost for Writing Across the Curriculum. He went on to serve as an associate professor of Interdisciplinary Arts and Sciences and director of the Writing Center at University of Washington, Tacoma. From 2019-2021, he served as the Associate Dean of Academic Affairs, Equity and Inclusion at Arizona State University in the College of Integrative Sciences and Arts. In the summer of 2021, he returned to full time faculty as Professor of Rhetoric and Composition in the same college.

In 2021, he gave a teacher training entitled "White Teachers are a Problem" that was central to a discrimination lawsuit against Penn State, and which has been determined to have plausibly created a hostile work environment.

== Professional contributions ==
=== Research ===
Inoue's research focuses on anti-racist educational methods broadly, with an emphasis on the teaching and assessment of postsecondary writing and language. His work on the theory and method of writing assessment calls for more locally-grounded practices that attend to the complex ecologies of the classroom. In Antiracist Writing Assessment Ecologies (2015), Inoue introduces a framework for understanding classroom writing assessment as a complex system or ecology. He emphasizes that this system encompasses interconnected elements and is more intricate than it may initially appear.

Inoue argues that incorporating antiracist principles into writing instruction is essential for effective literacy learning. Central to Inoue's argument is the concept of the white racial habitus, which he contends informs dominant discourses not only within academic settings but also in broader contexts. He asserts that without explicit antiracist agendas in their assessments, educators may unintentionally perpetuate racism. Inoue's 2022 book Labor-Based Grading Contracts: Building Equity and Inclusion in the Compassionate Writing Classroom continues his work in socially-just assessment by offering a practical model for grading that emphasizes students' efforts, or labor, rather than their socialization into dominant discourses and literacies. However, other research suggests that Inoue is not attentive to the psychology of Black students. This work suggests that Inoue overlooks the voices of Black students in his own classroom and, through a reanalysis of Inoue's data, finds that labor-based contract grading appears to widen performance gaps between Black students and those of other races.

Inoue's 2021 book Above The Well: An Antiracist Argument From a Boy of Color examines intersections of race, language, and literacy education by combining academic scholarship, personal anecdotes and auto-ethnography, and elements of fiction. By exploring his own background and education, Inoue highlights racial biases within English language standards perpetuated in educational institutions. A central theme of Inoue's research revolves around the pervasive phenomenon of individuals being evaluated and categorized based on implicit racialized linguistic norms. He coins the term "White language supremacy" to describe this phenomenon, contending that it plays a significant role in perpetuating racialized violence in contemporary society.

=== Philanthropy ===
In early 2021, Inoue created an antiracist teaching endowment with his partner/wife, Kelly, to be housed at their alma mater, Oregon State University. The Asao and Kelly Inoue Antiracist Teaching Endowment supports antiracist teaching and assessment research and practices in classrooms across disciplines in both secondary and postsecondary areas. The endowment also founded a new conference, the Conference for Antiracist Teaching, Language, and Assessment (ATLA), which held its first online convention in September and October 2021. Inoue has also donated all royalties for his book Above the Well (2021) to the endowment.

== Selected publications ==
Books

- Inoue, Asao B. (2015). Antiracist Writing Assessment Ecologies: Teaching and Assessing Writing for A Socially Just Future. Fort Collins: Parlor Press/WAC Clearinghouse.
- Inoue, Asao B. (2019). Labor-Based Grading Contracts: Building Equity and Inclusion in the Compassionate Writing Classroom. Fort Collins: WAC Clearinghouse/University Press of Colorado.
- Inoue, Asao B. (2021). Above The Well: An Antiracist Argument From a Boy of Color. The WAC Clearinghouse/Utah State University Press.

Articles & book chapters

- Inoue, Asao B. (2004). “Community-Based Assessment Pedagogy.” Assessing Writing 9.3, pp. 208–238.
- Inoue, Asao B. (2012). “Grading Contracts: Assessing Their Effectiveness on Different Racial Formations.” In Asao B. Inoue and Mya Poe (editors), Race and Writing Assessment, (peer-reviewed through the press). New York: Peter Lang. pp. 79–94.

== Notable awards ==
- 2014 CWPA Outstanding Scholarship Award for "Theorizing Failure in U.S. Writing Assessments" published in Research in the Teaching of English (48.3)
- 2014 CCCC Outstanding Book Award in the Edited Collection Category (Race and Writing Assessment)
- 2015 CWPA Outstanding Book Award (Antiracist Writing Assessment Ecologies: Teaching and Assessing Writing for a Socially Just Future)
- 2017 CCCC Outstanding Book Award (Antiracist Writing Assessment Ecologies: Teaching and Assessing Writing for a Socially Just Future)
