= On Monsieur's Departure =

Love poem by Queen Elizabeth I

"On Monsieur’s Departure" is an Elizabethan poem attributed to Elizabeth I. It is written in the form of a meditation on the failure of her marriage negotiations with Francis, Duke of Anjou, but has also been attributed to her alleged affair with, and love of, Robert Dudley, 1st Earl of Leicester.

Elizabeth I was unusually well-educated for a person of her time and wrote several poems, which seem to have been based on her life, in an era where courtly love was the European tradition. "On Monsieur’s Departure" is a poem in which the persona has fallen victim to unrequited love.

== History ==
The poem was never published, but was found in a manuscript from ca. 1630, and titled "Elizabeth: On Monsieur's Departure". The connection with Francis, Duke of Anjou is thus a matter of some conjecture.

== Full text ==
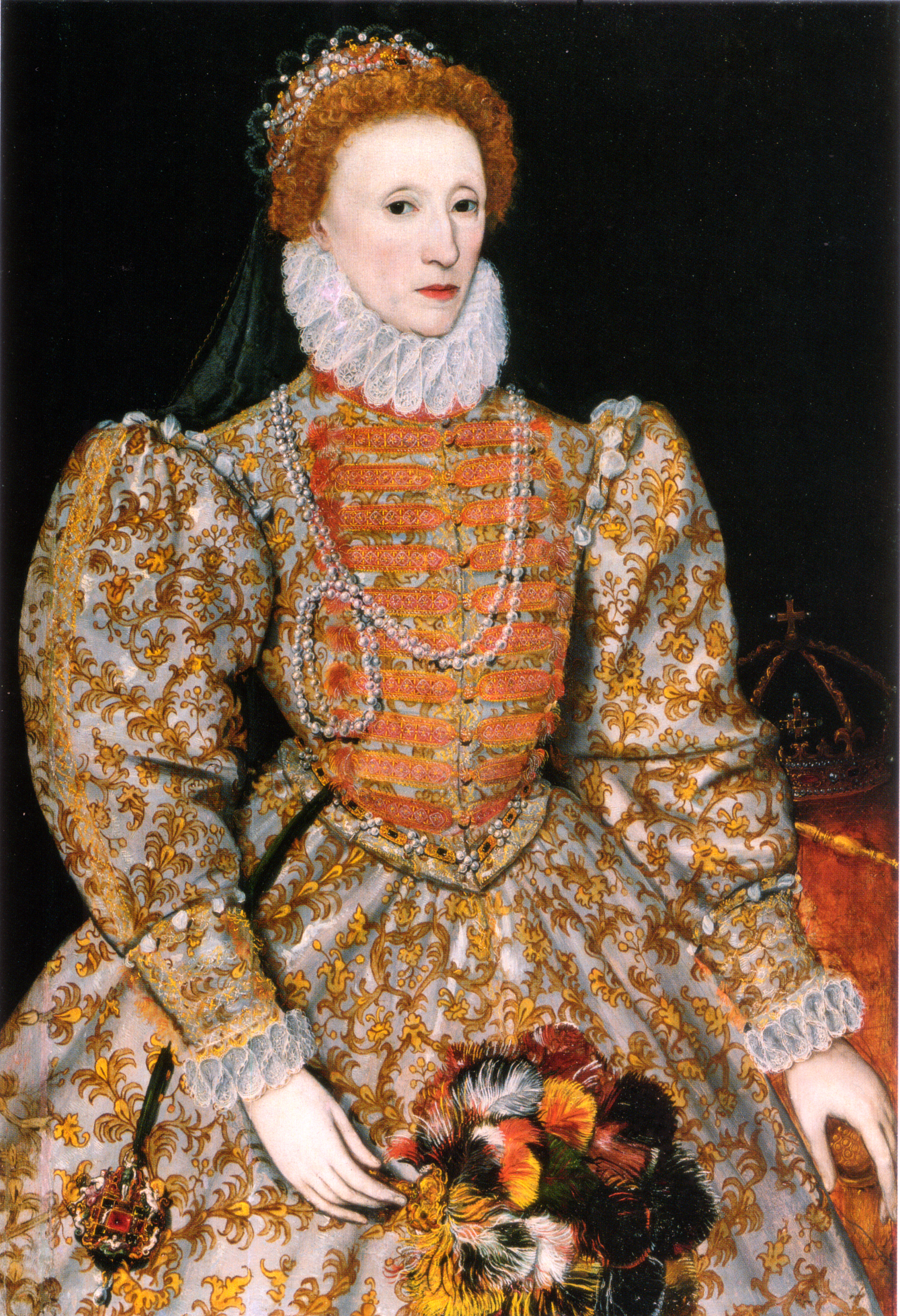
Elizabeth I (1533–1603), the supposed author of the poem

I grieve and dare not show my discontent;
I love, and yet am forced to seem to hate;
I do, yet dare not say I ever meant;
I seem stark mute, but inwardly do prate.
I am, and not; I freeze and yet am burned,
Since from myself another self I turned.

My care is like my shadow in the sun --
Follows me flying, flies when I pursue it,
Stands, and lies by me, doth what I have done;
His too familiar care doth make me rue it.
No means I find to rid him from my breast,
Till by the end of things it be suppressed.

Some gentler passion slide into my mind,
For I am soft and made of melting snow;
Or be more cruel, Love, and so be kind.
Let me or float or sink, be high or low;
Or let me live with some more sweet content,
Or die, and so forget what love e'er meant.

== Structure ==
The poem consists of three sestet stanzas, each in iambic pentameter, with a rhyme scheme following the ABABCC pattern.

== Analysis ==
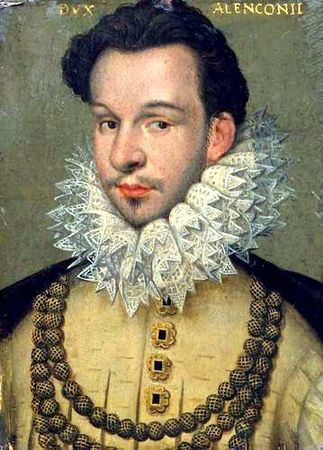
François, Duke of Alençon (1555–1584), a potential husband of Elizabeth, and perhaps the monsieur of the title

In the first stanza, the speaker explains how what they may feel needs to be carefully shielded from the outside world: they may not show their emotions, even when those emotions are overwhelming. In the last line the speaker suggests that because of the recent experience in love they have changed from their former self into another person.

The second stanza is about her unhappiness. It is her constant companion, she has never been able to make it go away, and she feels that only death could banish it.

In the third stanza Elizabeth asks for less intense feelings, saying she is fragile. She wishes Anjou were less nice so that she could get over her feelings more easily. The fourth line means either that she wishes she could feel good or bad, which would seem to contradict the first line, or that she wishes she could show (and vent) these feelings properly, or perhaps that she could feel one extreme or the other, rather than both at once: high or low. Finally, she says if she cannot be happier, she would like to die so that thoughts of love no longer trouble her. She doubts she will ever be fulfilled in terms of love. Whether she really wanted to die or said that for dramatic effect is unclear, and of course the overall sincerity of the poem is also unclear.

== Comparison ==
This poem differs from the poem "My Lute, Awake!" by Sir Thomas Wyatt, during the same time period. While they both portray unrequited love they portray it in a different manner. Elizabeth shares the responsibility with her lover and even knows of his pain. Yet in, "My Lute, Awake!" the author leaves all the blame to the woman that he desires and does not wish her well.

== Sources ==
- Applebee, Arthur N., et al. The Language of Literature- British Literature. Boston: McDougal Littell, 2000.
