= Contract grading =

Type of academic grading

Contract grading is an academic grading practice with multiple forms. While some contracts entail completion of a number of assignments of specified quality, corresponding to letter grades granted by an instructor, contract grading can be decided unilaterally by an instructor or arranged between instructors and students. Contract grading methods are based on labor, learning objectives, mastery-learning, and self assessment corresponding to the respective agreements of said contracts. In traditional grading, educators determine assignments, exams, and projects before the course begins. Students are expected to follow the syllabus and complete the tasks presented. The grade the student receives is a reflection of how well they completed the pre-determined syllabus. In this system, students are expected to follow a path that reflects the syllabus. In contrast, contract grading allows students to negotiate with an instructor, encouraging communication between both parties, contrasting traditional grading practices which focus on instructor's assessment of students' work. Contract grading is discussed in writing studies as an alternative to the traditional grading systems, with scholars testing its educational purposes and efficiency. Research has shown that contract grading can improve students' perceptions of fairness and reduce stress, while also increasing their sense of agency.

Contract grading may be contrasted with other grading methods such as grading on a curve or percentile systems. These curve and percentile systems include the Common Curve, Missouri Curve, and The Gaussian Curve. Grading on these curves creates an expectation that the number of "A"s and "B"s should correspond to the number of "D"s and "F"s, with the majority of students receiving a "C".

In the 2010s, contract grading was discussed and promoted as a method to respond to racism within academia and, more specifically, writing in academia. Labor-based contract grading has been identified as a more equitable approach, allowing students from diverse backgrounds to access pretty similar grading outcomes no matter their prior experiences.Asao Inoue, a major contributor to this topic, wrote in his book Labor-Based Grading Contracts: Building Equity and Inclusion in the Compassionate Writing Classroom:

"Designing fair and meaningful grading practices is about cultivating with our students an ecology, a place where every student, no matter where they come from or how they speak or write, can have access to the entire range of final course grades possible."

Research suggests that contract grading can encourage students to become more engaged in the writing process by emphasizing revision, feedback, and growth. In a study of first-year writing courses, students reported increased confidence in their writing and a greater willingness to seek feedback from peers and writing center tutors. The authors found that contract grading encouraged students to view feedback as an opportunity for improvement rather than as a source of judgement, helping them develop stronger writing habits and long-term connections to academic support resources.

== Overview ==
Contract grading allows students to devise their own path for a class by allowing them to pick and choose which assignments or projects they intend to complete. Grades are assigned on the basis of the agreement between the student and the professor. With contract grading, students have a say in their curriculum, as well as in how their grade is ultimately assessed. For some students, this grading system requires a more active role.

Although the student decides what is to be accomplished throughout the course, as with a contract, both the student and professor must come to an agreement. Grading contracts range from students turning in their initial contract or proposal, where the teacher then may make revisions or require that changes be made before a final agreement is made to the teacher introducing a contract to their student(s) with predetermined expectations for a guaranteed grade. A grade contract is often signed by both parties, confirming the agreement for a particular grade. However, the contract grading system is not as binding as a business contract. Some agreements allow for the student to resubmit the contract mid-semester provided the professor approves the changes.

Throughout the school terms students may get overwhelmed with other classes they might be taking, so taking a shortcut on their contract grading class by working through the assignments quickly does not get any understanding from the work they had just done. Having checkpoints between the school terms could help the students stay on track while helping them utilize their school campus resources. This could also tie in to meeting with the professor a certain amount of times throughout the durations of the contracts in order to show that the student has committed to the work and asking for help on their assignments.

Although many students responded positively to contract grading, some expressed resistance to the system. Students from a variety of backgrounds, including neurodivergent, honors, and BIPOC students, reported feeling uncomfortable without traditional grading. While they understood the concept of contract grading, many felt anxious cause grades had long been served as a way to measure their success and validate their identity as "good students". As a result, some students struggled to adjust to a system that emphasized learning and labor over conventional grade-based evaluation.

== Contract Styles ==
=== Labor-Based Contract Grading ===
Numerous writing scholars argue that writing assessment comes from social constructs, and therefore is subject to change and evolution. In 1993, Peter Elbow problematized traditional writing assessment by suggesting a shift in what to assess. When a teacher uses a letter, number, grid, symbol, or another kind of ranking system to reply to a student's writing assignment, they are evaluating according to a hypothetically unilateral standard of writing. A standard to which writing is measured, however, is subjective. In his article published in the journal College English, Elbow suggests that writing assessment be based on effort rather than on a subjective evaluation aligned with a standard. Asao B. Inoue has contributed to the literature on this topic, especially in the context of the writing classroom. He emphasizes a version of contract grading called labor-based contract grading as practice of antiracist writing assessment. This form of grading is connected to the effort a student puts forth rather than a "standard" form of writing.

Recent studies by Julia Voss, Nicole Branch, and Loring Pfeiffer from Santa Clara University, interviewed a group of international students. They learned that the students are good writers and have strong critical thinking and literacy skills but fail to show their writing skills in a normal traditional grading system and also due to the strict rubric which students have to follow in order to meet the satisfactory requirement for their essay. Labor-based grading allows students to take their time on research while guiding them towards the final paper.

=== Hybrid contract grading ===
Hybrid contract grading is described as an adaptation of contract-based assessment that keeps the expectations while also incorporating evaluations of the quality of student work. Hybrid Grading Contracts combine elements of Labor-Based contracts with traditional grading contracts. Hybrid Grading Contracts assess both labor and quality of a student's work in determining a student's grade. Hybrid contracts enable students to earn higher grades by doing extra tasks or earning extra points. Studies of hybrid contracts support measurable increases in student motivation, performance, and responsibility.

=== Unilateral Contract Grading ===
Unilateral contract grading is a form of contract grading, where a contract is set by an instructor. Students cannot negotiate the contract with their instructor. Some elements of unilateral contracts may include a labor requirement, regular attendance, participation, and revision of work. Even if students cannot negotiate the contract, instructors are obligated under contract to reward the grade. Jane Danielewicz and Peter Elbow popularized a model of unilateral contracts which also includes elements of Hybrid Contract Grading. Since unilateral contracts allow for very little student input, the grade of a student is determined by the final quality of their work.

==== Guaranteed "B" Contract ====
In 2009, Jane Danielewicz and Peter Elbow proposed a "Guaranteed B Contract", where they set the requirements of their course to their student(s) for a guaranteed "B" grade. Their model of the guaranteed "B" contract, used commonly, requires that students create a final portfolio while meeting a set of conditions to obtain a "B". Instructors disregard the quality of work done by their student(s) up to a "B" in favor of the conditions contracted. After the conditions of the contract are met, students are able to earn an "A" at the instructor's subjective discretion. This grading scheme is placed under the umbrella of Unilateral Contract Grading and Hybrid Contract Grading. The model is widely discussed within the contract grading space.

== Implementation ==
Students, in addition to choosing the grade they desire and how many assignments they will complete, must also commit themselves to the completion of their contract. Once the student determines the number of works he or she chooses to complete, contracts are then signed and agreed upon. There is a grace period for changing of contracts, but it is ultimately up to the professor to accept or to reject any proposals. The student then has the responsibility to complete and turn in the contracted assignments, with a few deadlines to meet. Iterative negotiation of contracts is often recommended to ensure fairness and clarity, allowing students to revise their agreements mid course if needed. First a teacher presents the grading contract to this class then the class if often given time to read over the contract. Next, if the teacher chooses to do so, the teacher will negotiate the terms of the contract. This means that the number of missed or late assignments to achieve a certain grade will be negotiated. There may or may not be a grace period to allow changes in the contract. Ultimately, all final decisions are left to the teacher. At the end of the contract, students will earn the grade that matches the terms of the contract.

Labor-based contract grading is also used to combat systemic racism in the classroom by calculating grades based on labor and having less restrictive guidelines in the classroom. Select scholars claim that writing standards and assessments favor students from white backgrounds over students from other cultural backgrounds. Labor-based grading contracts help solve this issue by valuing effort and voice over conventional grammar rules.

== Studies and research ==
In 1912–1913, Daniel Starch and Edward Charles Elliott conducted a study on the unreliability of academic grading curriculum. They found that there were no significant increases in learning in a grading system based on absolute standards. To test whether percentage based grading could truly encapsulate the accuracy of a student's performance they had high school teachers from different institutions grade sets of two student papers per subject. In their case study, they had 147 high school English teachers grade two identical English papers. The difference in score for the first paper ranged from 64% to 98% and the second ranged from 50% to 97%. It was made clear to Starch and Elliott that every instructor has their own difference in view in regards to academic performance. The same result occurred with mathematics, two student papers were sent to 128 high school math instructors. Scores for one paper ranged from 28% to 95%. These scores were the results of whether an instructor gave credit for showing work or graded solely based on the answer the student chose. Since instructors have a different perspective on Grade A Level work, personal biases would come into play in percentage based grading.

According to a study done in 2001 by William Yarber of Purdue University found that the knowledge attained from courses using grading contract systems is equal to the knowledge attained from traditional grading systems. Additionally the study found that the attitudes of students toward learning were the same in courses that used the grading contract system and the traditional grading method. Early research also found that clearly defined grading contracts influenced student engagement and motivation, with students demonstrating more consistent performance across assignment.

Studies have also found that students under contract grading have shown to have reduced stress and are more encouraged to complete their assignments on time. The study consisted of 439 high school students participating in the contract grading system. Results showed that 97% of students pass with a grade of A-C. 90% of students pass with the satisfactory requirement needed to earn an "A" or a "B" in the course. International students with different minorities who are not native English speakers have shown to have an 8.4% increase to have "A" grade under a contract and first generation students also showed a 4% increase for the "A" grade. Percentages have also shown to increase every year.

== Student reaction ==
A study published in 1990 received opinions about the contract grading system from 51 undergraduate education majors and 28 graduate students majoring in education at Acadia University in Nova Scotia, Canada. Students at both education levels reacted to the contract grading system in a positive manner. "They agreed that the grading system and assignments were made clear from the beginning, that the system was appropriate, and that grades were assigned fairly. When asked to rank the effectiveness and importance of the various aspects of contract grading, students reported that the key elements were the control they felt they had by being able to determine their grades, the clearly stated expectations for performance in the course, criterion referencing of assignments, and the mastery approach to learning."

A study conducted during the 1974–75 school year by James J. Polczynski on 280 students at a Midwest state university found that contract grading raised students instrumentality levels. The study also found that students opinion of their grade and the importance they place on their grade did not change. The largest change that the study found was that students felt a stronger assurance that a particular performance would match the grade they received better under the grading contract system than a traditional grading method. Moreover, students also reported that they felt they had more control over their grade in the course which in turn increased their level of motivation to participate in the course.

In research done by Katherine Daily O'Meara, she examined student reflections on engagement based grading contracts. She found there to be greater levels of participation when it came to learning and assessments. Students shared that there was more transparency and less confusion when it came to the course criteria, which in turn motivated them to become engaged in their learning. Other students shared that the grading contract helped gain responsibility and time management when completing their course work.

== Advantages ==
Contract grading can enable the student to progress at his or her own pace; additionally, contract grading emphasizes learning and reduces grade competition by shifting student and teacher attention away from the result of an assignment or course and towards the processes or habits that necessarily result in academic and intellectual growth. Research indicates that contract grading can increase students motivation and engagement while providing transparency in expectations. Systems of this style also encourage a cooperative learning process. By requiring instructor and student to work jointly, emphasis is added on the desires of the student and the goals he or she wishes to accomplish. According to Bucknell University, contract grading "facilitates the development of a partnership learning environment in which students are likely to retain more information, make better use of information, and be more highly motivated to learn than in teacher-directed learning environments." Due to the freedom allowed by the system, time management skills are acquired and exercised. Labor based grading contracts are seen as more fair than conventional grading contracts because course grades are determined by the amount of labor done by students and not influenced by knowledge the students had prior to the course. Further research argues that with support from institutions and teaching communities, it may be easier to implement grading contracts as an alternative approach with higher levels of success.

Contract grading has been shown to reduce stress and anxiety and it has increased students ability to focus and improve on their schoolwork. Students are often tense about what grade they may get but once they hear contract grading they are able to focus on their effort and not so much on making everything right. In Spring of 2022, 88% of contract grading students agreed they understood expectations compared to 76.8% of conventional students. Similar, though smaller, differences appeared in Fall 2021. Students in contract grading courses reported lower levels of grade-related stress and anxiety. In both semesters, fewer contract grading students reported high stress, while more reported low stress compared to students in conventional grading courses.

=== Removing racism from the classroom ===
Labor-based grading contracts are seen as more fair than conventional grading contracts because course grades are determined by the amount of labor done by students and not influenced by knowledge the students had prior to the course. Labor-based grading contracts seek to mitigate racial disparities in grading outcomes. A student's grade under a labor-based grading contract is solely determined by the work the student puts into the course rather than their prior knowledge of the subject. Evaluating a student's performance in the course based on knowledge alone can lead to racially disparate outcomes. Only labor-based grading contracts achieve this; because hybrid contracts require a standard of quality, they are still susceptible to disparities.

However, Joanna Wolfe has challenged the claim that labor-based grading is anti-racist, arguing that it disadvantages Black students. She reanalyzed data from earlier studies, finding that these implementations widened rather than decreased performance gaps between Black students and those of other races. Drawing on research from educational psychology, she argues that evaluating students solely on the amount of work they do is likely to increase Black students' fears of being negatively stereotyped, thereby decreasing their trust in the grading system and their motivation to invest effort.

== Disadvantages ==
Contract grading could be viewed as threatening to students who have relied upon structured grading processes. Increased responsibility may cause anxiety for students expecting more common approaches. Studies have also recorded that students in contract grading classrooms might experience uncertainty, especially when adjusting to the absence of traditional grading structures. In addition to concerns for the individual student, contract grading is largely dependent upon implementation by the instructor. Scholars have noted that the success of contract grading depends heavily on course design, transparency, and the clarity with which expectations about labor, revision, and assessment are communicated to students. An instructor may, through this grading system, cause students to take on greater responsibility for learning and success while simultaneously restricting freedom. Contract grading systems are susceptible to paternalism on the part of the instructor. Whereas the students take on the responsibility of choosing assignments, they may not also actively determine expectations. Some educators and students resist contract grading due to the increased responsibility and uncertainty about expected outcomes. Grade inflation is often viewed as bad because everyone would have an "A" and it would diminish the high value grade that separates everyone from the other. Grade inflation viewed in a contract grading system is when one student who took the time to work hard on an assignment to just get the same grade as one student who did not put in as much effort as the other students did and getting the same grade for that assignment. Many students view speaking in class as a difficult way to participate. To address this, some instructors include alternative participation in their grading contracts, such as written responses and reflections, allowing students to engage without having to speak during class discussions. A big concern when it comes to the concept of contract grading, is grade inflation. However, in this article Barnard explains the concerns about grade inflation that can cause anxieties amongst faculty, because they can be punished for handing out grades that are too high.

Furthermore, certain critics of contract grading propose that the labor-based contract does not adequately address classroom inequity. In her study published in 2021, Carillo found that contract grading further cemented “hidden inequities” like access to tutoring, family responsibilities, and financial constraints. Contract grading may be unable to solve these inequities because students are not be able to contribute equal effort in a labor-based system due to their outside obligations. Likewise, Wolfe found evidence that labor-based contract grading disadvantages Black students, calling into question claims that this practice is equitable.

Another criticism of grading contracts that has been discussed regarding concerns of educational opportunity, arguing that the contract may impact students differently depending on their current social and educational environments.It has been argued that contracts should be thoroughly reviewed regarding opportunities and availability, specifically for students that are a part of marginalized groups.

Labor-based grading contracts have also been critiqued for the challenges they pose to neurodivergent or disabled students. For example, neurodivergent or disabled students may have difficulties following participation requirements, timed requirements, negotiating contracts, or even how the work must be completed. These parameters could disadvantage students who prefer to work at their own pace, have trouble tracking their time, or are not willing to talk about their disabilities. Further research had concerns, suggesting that contract grading may not take into account the several ways in which these students engage with the course material. It is suggested that labor-based contracts can be adapted depending on student concerns. They have proposed changes in flexibility of deadlines, regular check-ins with students, flexibility in assignment completion, and even by having several forms of participation.
