= Francis, Duke of Anjou =

French prince (1555–1584)

Francis
- Duke of Alençon, Château-Thierry, Anjou, Berry, and Touraine
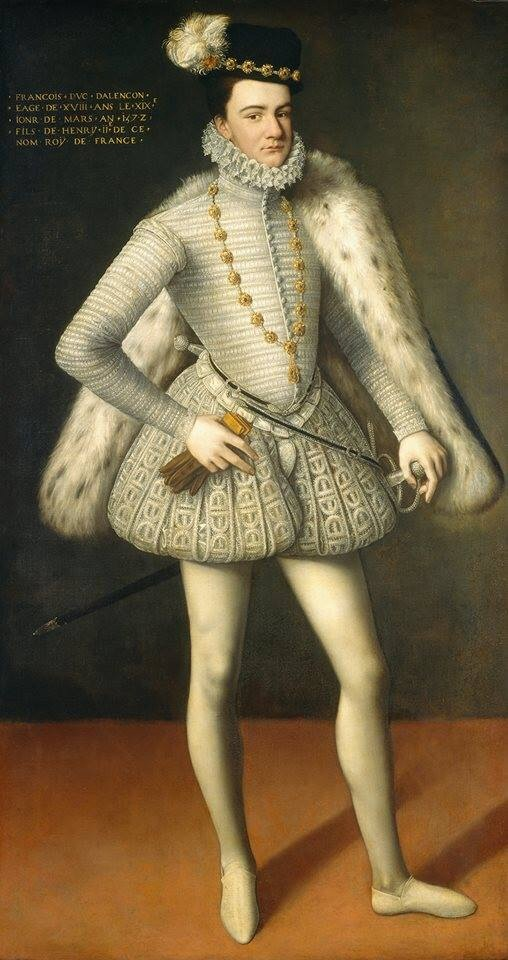
- The Duke in 1572
- Born: 18 March 1555; Château de Fontainebleau, Paris, France
- Died: 10 June 1584 (aged 29); Château-Thierry, Champagne, France
- Burial: 27 June 1584; Basilica of St Denis, France
Names
- Hercule François de France
- House: Valois-Angoulême
- Father: Henry II of France
- Mother: Catherine de' Medici

Monsieur François, Duke of Anjou and Alençon (French: Hercule François; 18 March 1555 – 10 June 1584) was the youngest son of King Henry II of France and Catherine de' Medici.

== Early years ==
He was scarred by smallpox at age eight, and his pitted face and slightly deformed spine did not suit his birth name of Hercule. He changed his name to Francis in honour of his late brother Francis II of France when he was confirmed.

The royal children were raised under the supervision of the governor and governess of the royal children, Claude d'Urfé and Françoise d'Humières, under the orders of Diane de Poitiers.

In 1574, following the death of his brother Charles IX of France and the accession of his other brother, Henry III of France, he became heir to the throne. In 1576 he was made Duke of Anjou, Touraine, and Berry. His brother Henry III had previously been Duke of Anjou.

== Alençon and the Huguenots ==
During the night of 13 September 1575, Alençon fled from the French court after being alienated from his brother King Henry III as they had had some differences. Both Henry III and Catherine de' Medici feared he would join the Protestant rebels. These fears proved well-founded; Francis joined the prince of Condé and his forces in the south. In February 1576, Henry, King of Navarre escaped from the French court, whereupon his forces also joined Condé. This combined army was enough to force Henry III to sue for peace and sign the very pro-Protestant "peace of Monsieur", or Edict of Beaulieu, on 6 May 1576. By "secret treaties" which formed part of this peace settlement, many on the Protestant side were rewarded with land and titles. Francis was awarded the Duchy of Anjou (along with other lands) and thus became the Duke of Anjou. He had the writer Jean de La Gessée as a secretary.

== Courting Elizabeth I ==
In 1579, negotiations commenced for marrying Anjou to Elizabeth I of England. Anjou sent Jean de Simier, his Master of Wardrobe, to England with a casket of jewels for the Queen. He was a charming courtier and Elizabeth nicknamed him her "singe" or monkey. Anjou wrote to Elizabeth that he would keep her picture by him "till the end of his bones".

Anjou was in fact the only one of Elizabeth's foreign suitors to court her in person. He made two visits to England, in 1579 and 1581. He was 24 and Elizabeth was 46. Despite the age gap, the two soon became very close, Elizabeth dubbing him her "frog" from a frog-shaped earring he had given her. Whether or not Elizabeth truly planned to marry Anjou is a hotly debated topic. She was quite fond of him, knowing that he was probably going to be her last suitor. The match was controversial among the English public: English Protestants warned the Queen that the "hearts [of the English people] will be galled when they shall see you take to husband a Frenchman, and a Papist ... the very common people well know this: that he is the son of the Jezebel of our age," referring to the Duke's mother, Catherine de' Medici. Among members of Elizabeth's Privy Council, only William Cecil, Lord Burghley, and Thomas Radclyffe, 3rd Earl of Sussex, supported the marriage scheme wholeheartedly. Most notable councillors, foremost among them Robert Dudley, 1st Earl of Leicester, and Sir Francis Walsingham, strongly opposed it, even warning the Queen of the hazards of childbirth at her age.

Between 1578 and 1581 the Queen resurrected attempts to negotiate a marriage with the Duke of Alençon. The Duke put himself forward as a protector of the Huguenots and a potential leader of the Dutch. In these years, Walsingham became friends with the diplomat of Henry of Navarre in England, the anti-monarchist Philippe de Mornay. Walsingham was sent to France in mid-1581 to discuss an Anglo-French alliance, but the French wanted the marriage agreed to first, and Walsingham had instructions to obtain a treaty before committing to the marriage. He returned to England without an agreement. Personally Walsingham opposed the marriage, perhaps to the point of encouraging public opposition. Alençon was a Catholic and as his elder brother, Henry III, was childless, he was heir presumptive to the French throne. Elizabeth was probably past the age of childbearing and had no clear successor. If she died while married to the French heir her realms could fall under French control. By comparing the match of Elizabeth and Alençon with the match of the Protestant Henry of Navarre and the Catholic Margaret of Valois, which occurred in the week before the St Bartholomew's Day massacre, the "most horrible spectacle" he had ever witnessed, Walsingham raised the spectre of religious riots in England in the event of the marriage proceeding. According to the Earl of Leicester, Elizabeth tolerated his blunt opinions and often unwelcome advice, referring to Walsingham as "her Moor who cannot change his colour" with regard to his strong beliefs.

Eventually Elizabeth pragmatically judged the union an unwise one, after considering the overwhelming opposition of her advisers. She continued, however, to play the engagement game, if only to warn Philip II of Spain, another of her suitors, of what she might do if it became necessary. Finally Elizabeth bade him farewell in 1581. On his departure she penned a poem, "On Monsieur's Departure", which, taken at face value, has lent credence to the notion that she may really have been prepared to go through with the match.

== Anjou in the Netherlands ==
Anjou continued on to the Netherlands. In 1579 William the Silent had invited him to become hereditary sovereign of the United Provinces, and on 29 September 1580 the Dutch States General (with the exception of Zeeland and Holland) had signed the Treaty of Plessis-les-Tours with the Duke, who would assume the title "Protector of the Liberty of the Netherlands" and become the sovereign. He did not arrive until 10 February 1582, when William officially welcomed him in Flushing. In spite of the Joyous Entries he was accorded in Bruges and Ghent and his ceremonious installation as Duke of Brabant and Count of Flanders, Anjou was not popular with the Dutch and Flemish, who continued to see the Catholic French as enemies; the provinces of Zeeland and Holland refused to recognise him as their sovereign, and William, the central figure of the "Politiques" who worked to defuse religious hostilities, came under extensive criticism for his "French politics".

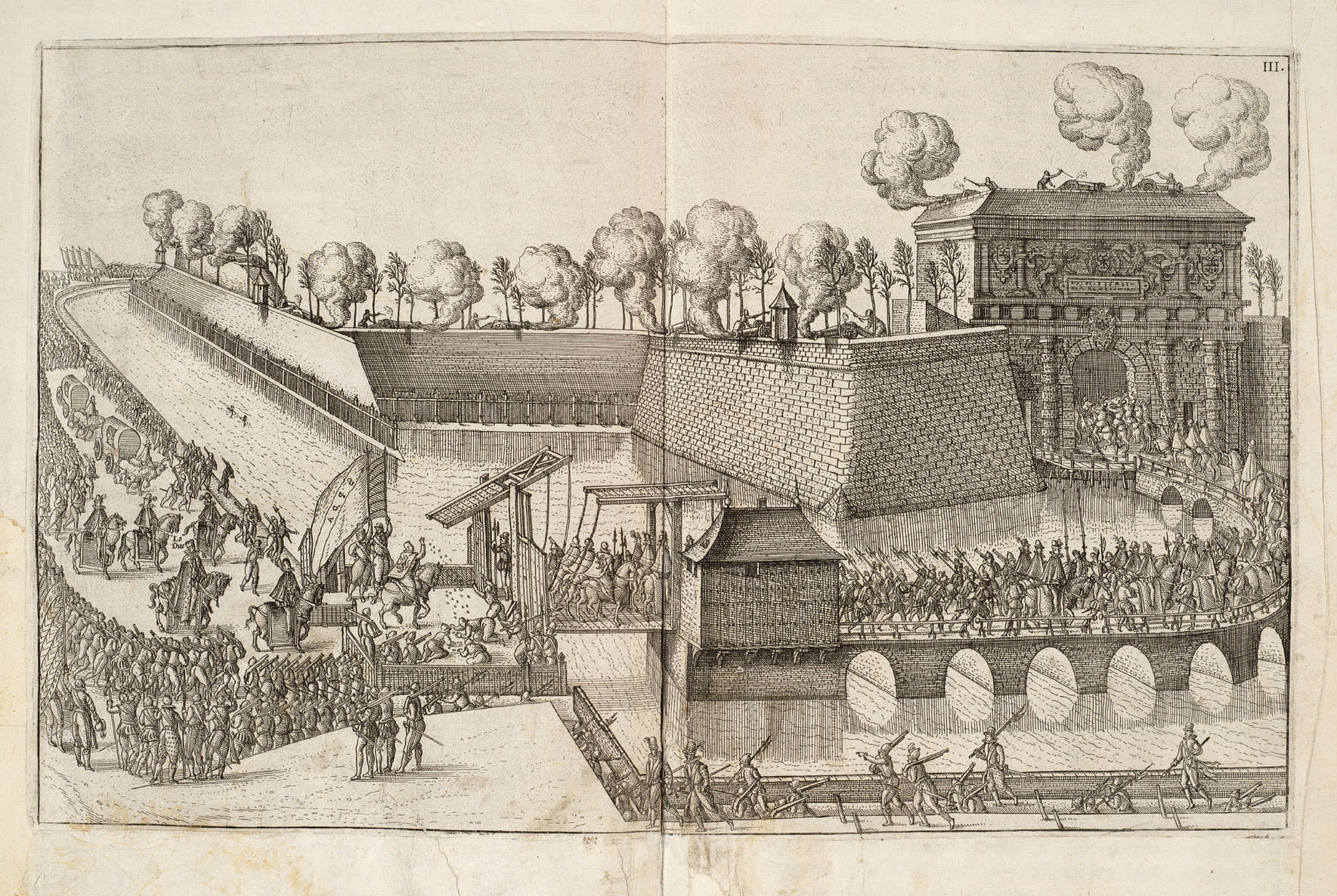
The Duke enters Antwerp, greeted by cannons

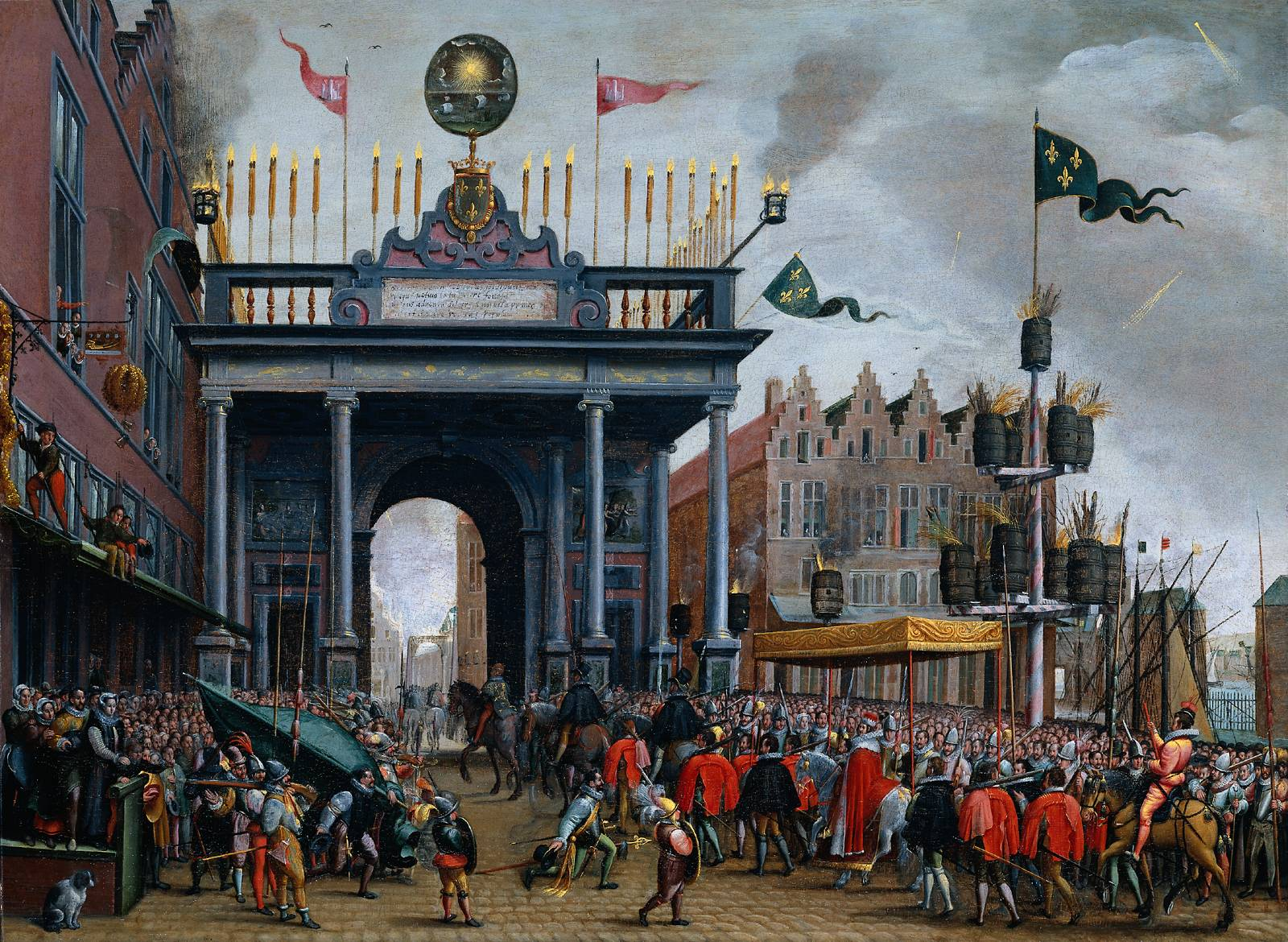
Joyous Entry in Antwerp on 19 February 1582 (Rijksmuseum Amsterdam)

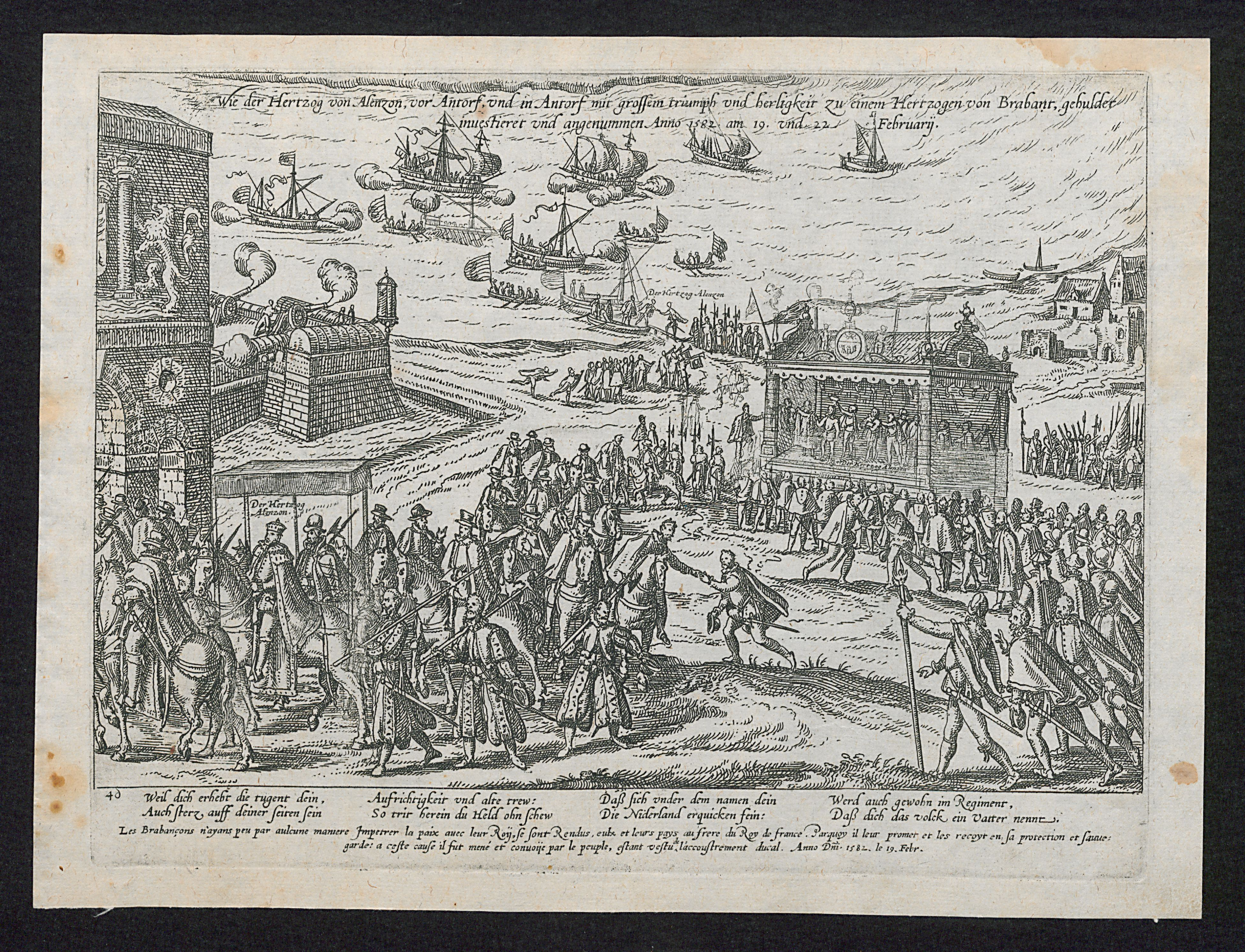
The Duke's arrival in Antwerp on 19 and 22 February 1582 (Print Room of the University of Antwerp)

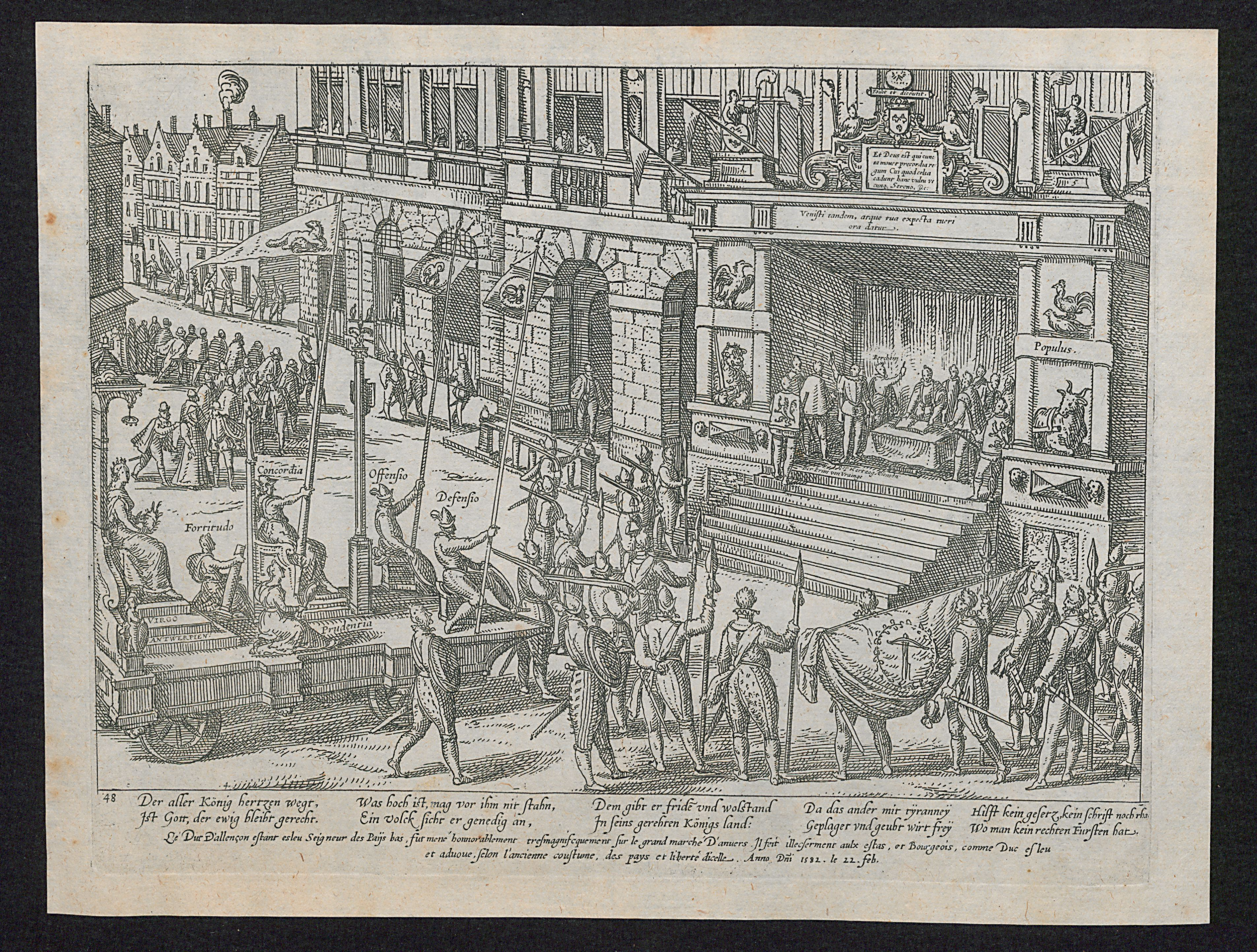
Anjou's inauguration in front of Antwerp's City Hall on 22 February 1582 ( Print Room of the University of Antwerp)

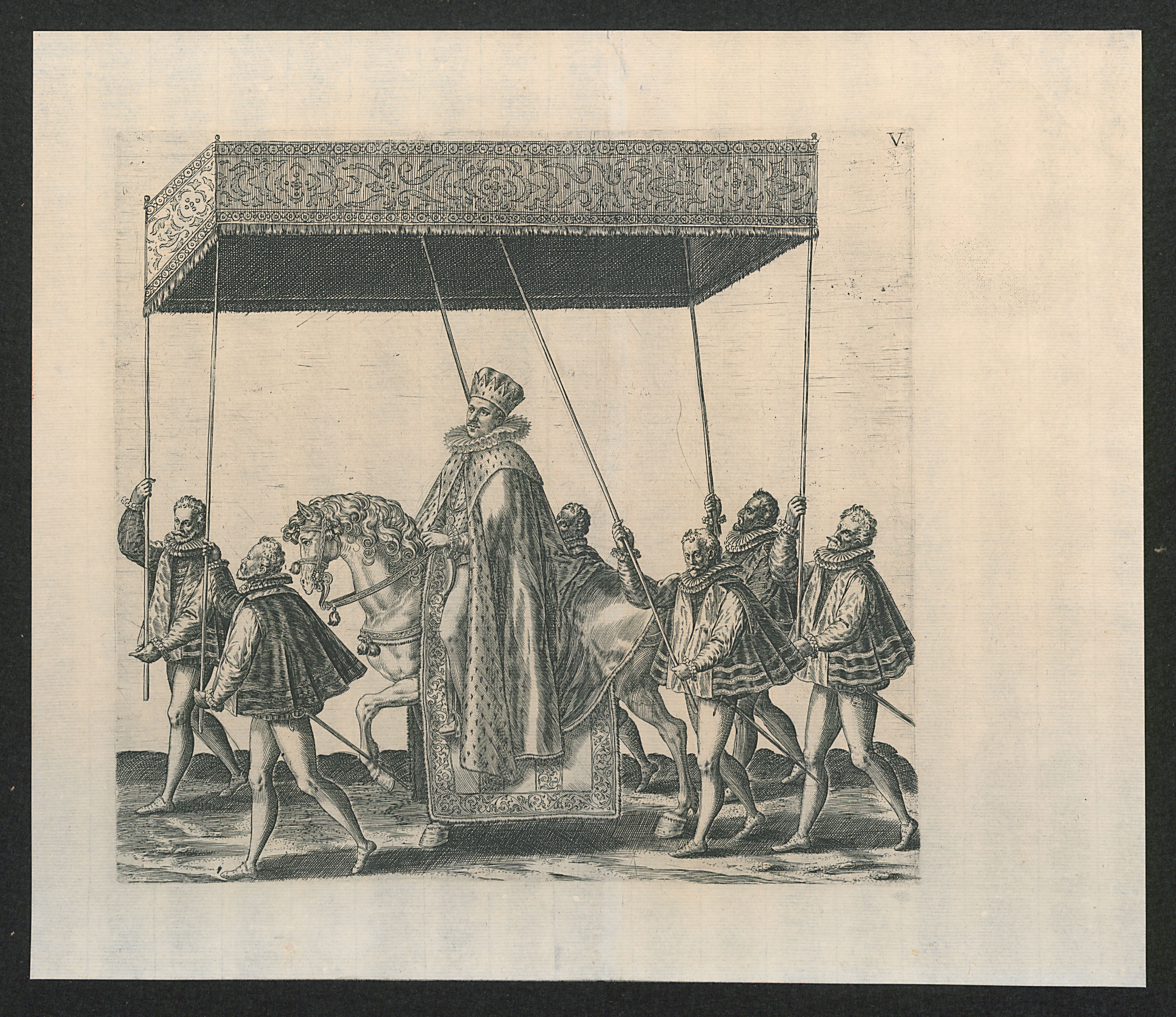
Anjou on his horse under a baldachin during the Joyous Entry in 1582 (Print Room of the University of Antwerp)

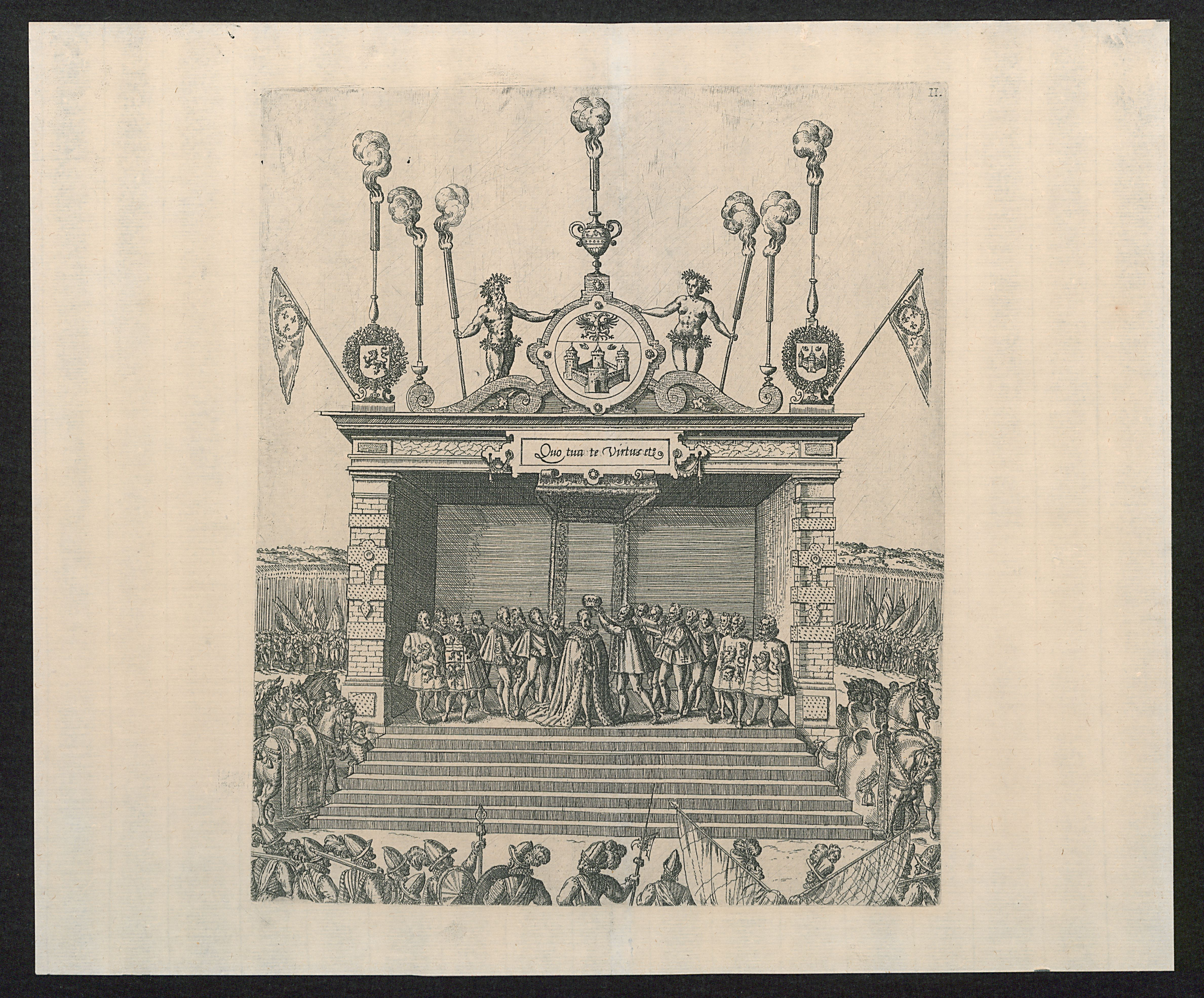
Anjou's coronation on stage - 1582 (Print Room of the University of Antwerp)

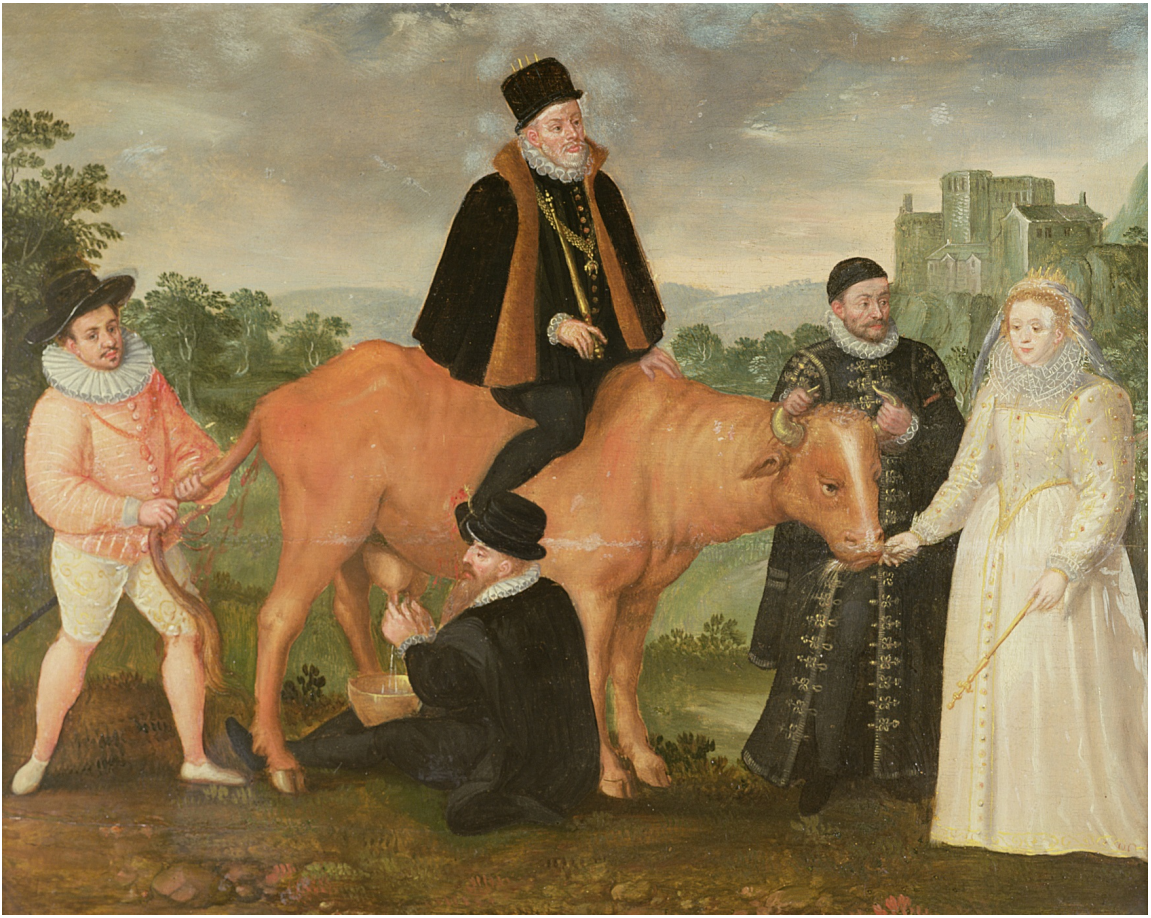
Satirical Flemish painting painted c.1586, three years after Anjou's Antwerp fiasco; depicting a cow which represents the Dutch provinces. King Philip II of Spain vainly tries to ride the cow, drawing blood with his spurs. Queen Elizabeth I feeds it while William of Orange holds it steady by the horns. The cow is defecating on the Duke of Anjou, who holds its tail. (Toronto Public Library)

He is now thought to have been the patron behind the "Valois tapestries" presented to Catherine de' Medici, which depicted major figures in Catherine's court against scenes of festivity. When Anjou's French troops arrived in late 1582, William's plan seemed to pay off, as even the Duke of Parma feared that the Dutch would now gain the upper hand.

However, Anjou himself, dissatisfied with his limited power, decided to take control of the Flemish cities of Antwerp, Bruges, Dunkirk, and Ostend by force.

He would personally lead the attack on Antwerp. To fool the citizens of Antwerp, Anjou proposed that he should make a "Joyous Entry" into the city, a grand ceremony in which he would be accompanied by his French troops. On 18 January 1583, Anjou entered Antwerp, but the citizens had not been deceived. The city militia ambushed and destroyed Anjou's force in the French Fury. Anjou barely escaped with his life.

== Death ==
Coat-of-arms (after 1576)

The debacle at Antwerp marked the end of Anjou's military career. His mother, Catherine de' Medici, is said to have written to him: "would to God you had died young. You would then not have been the cause of the death of so many brave gentlemen." Another insult followed when Elizabeth I formally terminated her engagement to him after the massacre. After this attack, Anjou's position became untenable and he eventually left the country in June. His departure also discredited William, who nevertheless maintained his support for Anjou.

Soon Anjou fell seriously ill with "tertian ague", malaria. Catherine de' Medici brought him back to Paris, where he reconciled with his brother, King Henry III of France, in February 1584. Henry even embraced his brother, whom he had famously called le petit magot ("little macaque"). By June, the Duke of Anjou was dead. He was 29. His premature death meant that the Huguenot Henry of Navarre became heir-presumptive, thereby causing an escalation in the French Wars of Religion.

== Titles ==
- 1560–1584: Duke of Évreux
- 1566–1584: Duke of Alençon; Duke of Château-Thierry; Count of Perche; Count of Meulan; Count of Mantes
- 1576–1584: Duke of Anjou; Duke of Berry; Duke of Touraine
- 1580–1584: Lord of the Netherlands
- 1582–1584: Duke of Brabant, Count of Flanders

== Bibliography ==
- Anselme de Sainte-Marie, Père (1726). Histoire généalogique et chronologique de la maison royale de France [Genealogical and chronological history of the royal house of France] (in French). Vol. 1 (3rd ed.). Paris: La compagnie des libraires.
- Holt, Mack P. (1986). The Duke of Anjou and the Politique Struggle during the Wars of Religion. Cambridge University Press.
- Knecht, Robert J. (2002). The French Religious Wars 1562-98. Oxford: Osprey Publishing. p. 53. ISBN 978-1-84176-395-8.
- Lockyer, Roger (1985). Tudor and Stuart Britain 1471-1714. Longman Group UK Limited.
- Tomas, Natalie R. (2003). The Medici Women: Gender and Power in Renaissance Florence. Aldershot, UK: Ashgate. ISBN 0-7546-0777-1.
- Questier, Michael (2019). Dynastic Politics and the British Reformations, 1558-1630. Oxford University Press.
- Whale, Winifred Stephens (1914). The La Trémoille family. Boston, Houghton Mifflin. p. 43.
