= Judith A. Langer =

Literacy educator

Academic background
- Education: Hofstra University
- Thesis: An idiosyncratic model of affective and cognitive silent reading strategies (1978)

Judith A. Langer is an American educator in the field of literacy research. She is Vincent O’Leary Distinguished Professor Emeritus at the University at Albany, State University of New York. She served as editor of the journal Research in the Teaching of English from 1984 to 1992. Langer is known for her research into literacy and how people engage with words in classroom settings.

== Education and career ==
Langer earned her bachelor's and master's degrees from the City College of New York. She earned her Ph.D. from Hofstra University in 1978 and held professorial appointments at C.W. Post University, New York University, the University of California, Berkeley, and Stanford University before joining the University at Albany as full professor in 1987, rising to the rank of distinguished professor in 2001.

As of 2024, she is the Vincent O’Leary Distinguished Professor Emeritus at the University at Albany.

She served as co-editor-in-chief of the journal Research in the Teaching of English from 1984 to 1992.

== Research ==
Langer is known for her research on literacy and how people engage with words in classroom settings. She has explored ways to tailor students’ writing assignments to achieve broader learning goals. Her sociocognitive theory is based on the recognition that literacy behaviors – reading, writing and thinking in literate ways – are based in culturally appropriate ways specific to groups and societies. Langer's worked "envisionment-building classrooms," sometimes called "minds-on classrooms," in which activities and assignments are designed to invite students to become engaged with the material, raise questions and build understandings pertaining to their goals. Among her publications, Langer explained her theory of literature learning in her book Envisioning Literature (1995, 2011) and expanded her theories to explain strategies in the acquisition of knowledge more broadly in Envisioning Knowledge (2011). One practical application of Langer’s work came in her series of studies of how certain schools "beat the odds" in student achievement, a strand that has spawned much related research while being used to inform school improvement efforts, especially in low-performing schools. Beyond her academic publications, this work is covered in her book for parents and educators alike, Getting to Excellent: How to Create Better Schools (2010).

== Selected publications ==
- Langer, J.A. Children Reading and Writing: Structures and Strategies. Norwood, NJ: Ablex (1986).
- Langer, J.A. and Applebee, A. How Writing Shapes Thinking: Studies of Teaching and Learning. Research Monograph Series. Urbana, IL: National Council of Teachers of English (1987).
- Langer, J.A. Effective Literacy Instruction: Building Successful Reading and Writing Programs. Urbana, IL: National Council of Teachers of English (2002).
- Langer, J.A. Envisioning Knowledge: Building Literacy in the Academic Disciplines. NY: Teachers College Press (2011).
- Applebee, A.N. & Langer, J.A. Writing Instruction that Works: Proven Methods for Middle and High School Classrooms. NY: Teachers College Press (2013).

== Awards and honors ==
Langer was inducted into the International Reading Hall of Fame in 2002 and won the Albert J. Harris award from the International Literacy Association for research on teaching students with reading difficulties in 2003. She was awarded the David H. Russell Award for Distinguished Research in the Teaching of English from the National Council of Teachers of English for her 12th book, Envisioning Knowledge, in 2013. She was named a fellow of the American Educational Research Association in 2008, the first year the fellows were elected. In 2005 she received an honorary doctorate from the University of Uppsala.

== Personal life ==
Langer married fellow literacy researcher Arthur Applebee, and the two were the first wife and husband both to reach the rank of distinguished professor within the New York State universities.
