= Anchor paper =

Sample essay response to an assignment or test question

An anchor paper is a sample essay response to an assignment or test question requiring an essay, primarily in an educational effort. Unlike more traditional educational assessments such as multiple choice, essays cannot be graded with an answer key, as no strictly correct or incorrect solution exists. The anchor paper provides an example to the person reviewing or grading the assignment of a well-written response to the essay prompt. Sometimes examiners prepare a range of anchor papers, to provide examples of responses at different levels of merit.

== Purpose of Anchor Papers ==
Anchor papers are frequently used in standards based assessment, authentic assessment and holistic grading, where essay prompts are more common. They are especially used when grading essay responses on a mass scale, such as by graders working for the College Board.

Typically, any particular grading project only employs a few anchor papers. Educators have commented that matching the diversity of responses against one or two papers is often difficult, resulting in inconsistencies among graders working on the same project.

A report by experts from Arizona State University stated that guidelines for scoring are adopted for quality assessment of writing samples meant for the preparation of performance evaluation. Anchor papers stand for scoring points defined in the directions.

At Tennessee, the State's education department formulated writing policies for (2017-2018) coring student responses from the writing section of the TN Ready Assessment. The Department provided guidelines, so educators can train students for the Assessment's writing category even if these policies were not prepared for use as instructional resources. The marked anchor papers of students show how procedures are employed as individual papers representing multiple performance levels. Anchor papers facilitate better understanding of writing rules and guide discussions regarding modifications and adjustments.
