= Jean de La Gessée =

French poet, historian and genealogist

Jean Gesse, known as Jean de La Gessée (or Jessée), born in Mauvezin in Gascony around 1550 and died around 1600, was a French poet, historian and genealogist.

== Biography ==
La Gessée was secretary to the Duke of Alençon.

== Judgments ==
From the seventeenth to the nineteenth century, literary historians generally had little regard for La Gessée's poetic talent. Charles Lenient said of the ode-satire genre that La Gessée invented: “This rigmarole […] went to join […] the chimeras of which the 16th century was the cradle and the tomb.” Robert Sabatier judged La Gessée “prosaic and conventional” but conceded that, sometimes, he “surprisingly astonishes by the boldness of his finds.” Guy Demerson, in the Introduction to his reissue of La Gessée's Jeunesses, expressed the wish that these works be read "without the prejudices of a gaze obscured by the critical tradition".

== Publications ==
- Exécration sur les infracteurs de la paix, œuvre extrait du second livre des poëmes de l'auteur, 1572
- La Rochelléide, contenant un nouveau discours sur la ville de la Rochelle, suivant les choses plus mémorables avenues en icelle, et au camp du Roi, depuis le commancement du siège jusqu'à la fin du mois de mars dernier, avec une louange des princes, grands seigneurs, et chefs de l'armée, 1573
- Le Tombeau de très noble et très excellent prince Claude de Lorraine, duc d'Aumale et pair de France, occis devant la Rochelle en ce mois de mars 1573, plus l'Épitaphe du mesme en diverses formes de vers latins gesséiens nouvellement inventés par le même auteur, 1573, en ligne.
- Nouveau discours sur le siège de Sanserre, depuis le commencement qu'il fut planté devant la ville au mois de janvier 1573, jusques à présent, le camp du Roy estant encores aux environs d'icelle, plus une complainte de la France, en forme de chanson, 1573
- La Grasinde de Jean de La Gessée, précédé d'un sonnet dédié à Monsieur, d'un dialogue, et suivi d'une Remonstrance à Pierre de Ronsard, 1578, en ligne.
- Discours du temps, de fortune et de la mort, 1579, en ligne.
- Traicté sur les genealogies, alliances et faicts illustres de la maison de Montmorancy, 1579
- Les Odes-Satyres et quelques sonets de Jean de La Gessée. À la royne de Navarre, 1579, en ligne.
- Discours sur la venue et honorable réception de Monsieur, fils & frere de roy, duc de Brabant, marquis du S. Empire, duc d'Anjou, &c. és païs bas, 1582.
- La Flandre à Monseigneur, plus XIIII sonnetz françoys et quelques vers latins, 1582.
- Les Premieres Œuvres françoyses de Jean de la Jessée, 3 volumes, 1583 En ligne : 1. Les Jeunesses 2. Les Meslanges 3. Les Amours. La Sévère. La Grasinde. Les Discours poétiques.
- Larmes et regretz sur la maladie et trespas de Mgr François de France, filz et frère de roys, plus quelques lettres funèbres, 1584, en ligne.
- La Philosophie morale et civile du sieur de La Jessée, 1595, en ligne.
- Relations du siège de Sancerre en 1573, par Jean de La Gessée et Jean de Lery, conformes aux éditions originales; suivies de diverses pièces historiques relatives à la même ville, 1842

== Critical edition ==
- Jean de la Gessée, Les Jeunesses, édition critique publiée par Guy Demerson, avec une biographie et une bibliographie par J.-Ph. Labrousse; Paris, Société des Textes français modernes, 1991.
