= The Doubt of Future Foes =

16th century British poem by Elizabeth I of England

"The Doubt of Future Foes" is a poem written by Elizabeth I of England sometime between 1568 and 1571. It concerns her relationship with her cousin and enemy, Mary, Queen of Scots.

Elizabeth I rose to the throne of England in 1558 after the relatively rapid succession of three previous monarchs. There were many plots for her death or removal from the English throne, as is apt to occur in any monarchy. This poem was written in direct response to a certain conspirator, however. Mary Queen of Scots was living in England under custody of Elizabeth I since her forced abdication of the Scottish throne in 1567. After a Catholic uprising in Scotland with the aim to place Mary on the English throne, a papal bull, Regnans in Excelsis, was published in 1570 releasing all Catholics from allegiance to Elizabeth and threatening excommunication to any that continued in allegiance to Elizabeth. This gave way to a wave of anti-Elizabethan feelings among the Catholics. Mary became the focal point for many plots, even if she was unaware of them. She was complicit, however, in at least one, known as the Babington Plot. Several Catholic persons, including Sir Anthony Babington of Derbyshire, were plotting to place Mary on the throne, and a series of letters between Mary and the conspirators showed that she knew of the plot. The plot was discovered, and Mary, among others, was imprisoned. In 1587, she was executed for her part in the Babington Plot.
