= White habitus =

Pattern of socialization among white people

White habitus is a pattern of socialization among white people that excludes black people and their culture, created as a result of racial segregation.

Colorblind racism can be seen as a product of white habitus.

== See also ==
- Systemic racism
