= Arthur Applebee =

American education researcher (1946–2015)

- Born: April 20, 1946; Sherbrooke, Quebec, Canada
- Died: September 20, 2015 (aged 69)
- Spouse: Judith Langer
- Awards: David H. Russell Award for Distinguished Research in the Teaching of English, James R. Squire Award

Academic background
- Education: Yale, University of London

Arthur Noble Applebee (April 20, 1946 – September 20, 2015) was a researcher and professional leader in United States secondary education. He obtained his doctorate at the University of London in 1973 and held professorships at Stanford University (1980–1987) and the University at Albany, State University of New York (1987–2015). Active in national policy, he assisted in validating the Common Core State Standards and co-authored fourteen of the National Assessment of Educational Progress's "Reading Report Cards" documenting student achievement. He also documented the state of the teaching of writing in U.S. Secondary Schools in a number of studies. In addition to his scholarly work, he also was lead author/editor on numerous series of English textbooks for both primary and secondary schools, comprising at least 35 volumes. Applebee served as editor from 1984 to 1991 of Research in the Teaching of English (the official research journal of the National Council of Teachers of English), as president of the National Conference on Research in Language and Literacy and as a member of the Validation Committee for the Common Core State Standards.

The National Council of the Teachers of English in 1998 granted him the David H. Russell Award for Distinguished Research in the Teaching of English for his book Curriculum as Conversation and in 2016 (posthumously) the James R. Squire Award for transformative contribution to the profession. He was elected to the Reading Hall of Fame (2004) and appointed as a fellow of the American Educational Research Association in 2013. His life and accomplishments were honored by leading literacy scholars contributing 14 chapters to English Language Arts Research and Teaching: Revisiting and Extending Arthur Applebee's Contributions, a festschrift published by Routledge and by the collection of 22 memorials in Research in the Teaching of English. The Literacy Research Association has named The Arthur Applebee Award for Excellence in Research on Literacy in his honor.

== Life and education ==
Born in Sherbrooke, Quebec, Canada, he grew up in a rural area of upstate New York, where he attended school up until his senior year of high school when his family moved and he attended the University High School of the University of Illinois at Urbana-Champaign. He then attended and graduated from Yale with a BA in English in 1968. Even before his graduation he was publishing research articles based on the NCTE archives, where he worked part time. His undergraduate research became the basis of his still widely cited first book, Tradition and Reform in the Teaching of English. He then obtained a MAT at Harvard University in 1970.

As a conscientious objector during the Vietnam War, he did two years alternative service at the Child Development Laboratory at Massachusetts General Hospital. He completed his Doctorate in 1973 at the University of London, supervised by James N. Britton. His doctoral dissertation formed the basis of his most cited work, The Child's Concept of Story.

He married Judith A. Langer, also a researcher in literature and literacy. They published joint work and are also notable as the first husband and wife to each hold the position of distinguished professor at SUNY (the highest rank for faculty).

Applebee began his teaching career in England following a postdoctoral year as an evaluator on an OECD Research Unit at the University of Lancaster. He taught from 1974 to 1976 at Tarleton High School in Lancaster. He returned to the United States to work for the National Council of Teachers of English, and then took up an associate professorship at Stanford University from 1980 to 1987. At that point he moved to SUNY–Albany as a full professor (then distinguished professor in 2007) where he remained until his death. During his tenure there he was director of the National Research Center on English Learning and Achievement (until 1996 called the National Research Center on Literature Teaching and Learning).

Applebee died on September 20, 2015, due to complications of Lewy body dementia.

== Research ==
Arthur Applebee's first book, Tradition and Reform in the Teaching of English, documented and critically analyzed the history of secondary English instruction from colonial times until the 1960s, providing insights that have guided later progressive developments in the teaching of English. A number of his subsequent inquiries has continued to document the changing developments in curriculum and practice, including monographs for the National Assessment of Educational Progress, and numerous journal articles.

His second book The Child's Concept of Story, using a mix-methods design looks at developments of story concept in children from pre-school though adolescence across several dimensions, including symbolization, elaboration, role of spectator, narrative structure, awareness of fantasy, and personal response. Its citation history indicates how it has become a cornerstone work for studies of children's literary development. His later book Literature in the Secondary School pursues the implications and implementations of that work for contemporary classroom practices. He also applied the insights to his multiple textbook series for primary and secondary schools.

Over his career he gave increasing focus to curriculum and practices in the teaching of writing, resulting in numerous articles, NAEP reports, and the books Writing in the Secondary School, and Writing Instruction that Works. He also pursued the impact of learning to write on the thought and intellectual growth of the developing student. In this study he reached beyond the Language Arts Classrooms to schoolwork in the sciences, social studies, and practical arts, as presented in How Writing Shapes Thinking (with Judith Langer).

All these themes came together in his reconceptualization of the Language Arts curriculum as a conversation, most fully articulated in his book Curriculum as Conversation. In addition to his scholarly publication, Applebee was quoted in and contributed to popular and policy discussions about language and learning. For example, he published a 2012 article in The Atlantic arguing that "great writing comes out of great ideas."

== Selected book publications ==
- Tradition and Reform in the Teaching of English (1974). National Council of Teachers of English.
- The Child's Concept of Story (1978). University of Chicago Press. ISBN 978-0-226-02117-1
- Writing in the Secondary School (1981). National Council of Teachers of English.
- Contexts for Learning to Write: Studies of Secondary School Instruction (1984). ABLEX. ISBN 978-0-89391-225-3
- How Writing Shapes Thinking (with Judith Langer) (1987). National Council of Teachers of English.
- Literature in the Secondary School (1993). National Council of Teachers of English.
- Curriculum as Conversation (1996). University of Chicago Press.
- Writing Instruction that Works: Proven Methods for Middle and High School Classrooms (with Judith A. Langer, Kristen Campbell Wilcox, Marc Nachowitz, Michael P. Mastroiani, and Christine Dawson) (2013). Teachers College Press.

== Honors and awards ==
- Promising Researcher Award. The National Council of the Teachers of English, 1974
- Fellow, Rockefeller Foundation Study Center, Bellagio Italy, 1994
- David H. Russell Award for Distinguished Research in the Teaching of English. The National Council of the Teachers of English, 1998
- Chancellor's Award for Research Excellence, SUNY (systemwide), 2002
- Reading Hall of Fame, 2004
- American Educational Research Association, Fellow, 2013
- James R. Squire Award for transformative contribution to the profession The National Council of the Teachers of English, 2016 (posthumous)
