= 1599 in literature =

This article lists notable literary events and publications in 1599.

== Events ==
- January – English poet Edmund Spenser is buried near Geoffrey Chaucer at Westminster Abbey, beginning the tradition of Poets' Corner.
- Spring/Summer – The Globe Theatre is built in Southwark, at this time beyond the jurisdiction of the London city authorities, utilising material from The Theatre.
- June 4 – The Bishops' Ban of 1599: Middleton's Microcynicon: Six Snarling Satires and Marston's Scourge of Villainy are publicly burned as the English ecclesiastical authorities crack down on the craze for satire in the past year. Richard Bancroft, Bishop of London and John Whitgift, Archbishop of Canterbury tighten their enforcement of existing censorship. Earlier, minor works like pamphlets and plays were being published only with the approval of the Wardens of the Stationers Company and without ecclesiastical review; this arrangement is terminated.
- June 7 – John Day kills fellow playwright Henry Porter, allegedly in self-defence.
- September 21 – The first recorded performance of Shakespeare's Julius Caesar takes place at the Globe Theatre in London, according to the Swiss traveller Thomas Platter the Younger.
- Late – War of the Theatres: Satire, being prohibited in print, breaks out in the London theatres. In Histriomastix, Marston satirizes Jonson's pride through the character Chrisoganus; Jonson responds by satirizing Marstons's wordy style in Every Man out of His Humour, acted by the Lord Chamberlain's Men.
- The English comic actor Will Kempe leaves the Lord Chamberlain's Men earlier in the year, probably to be replaced by the end of it by Robert Armin.
- King James VI of Scotland arranges for a company of English players to erect a playhouse and perform in his country.
- The first printing in England of Richard de Bury's The Philobiblon (1345) is made by Oxford bibliophile Thomas James.

== New books ==
=== Prose ===
- George Abbot – A Brief Description of the Whole World
- Mateo Alemán – Guzmán de Alfarache
- John Bodenham – Wits' Theater
- Roger Fenton – An Answer to William Alabaster, His Motives
- Ferrante Imperato – Dell'Historia Naturale
- Richard Johnson - Tom a Lincoln
- Thomas Morley – The First Book of Consort Lessons
- John Rainolds – Th'Overthrow of Stage Plays

=== Drama ===
- Anonymous
  - A Larum for London (or c. 1602)
  - Sir Clyomon and Sir Clamydes published (written c. 1570)
  - A Warning for Fair Women published
- Thomas Dekker
  - Old Fortunatus
  - Patient Grissel (with Henry Chettle and William Haughton)
  - The Shoemaker's Holiday
- Michael Drayton, Richard Hathwaye, Anthony Munday, & Robert Wilson – Sir John Oldcastle
- Robert Greene
  - Alphonsus King of Aragon (published)
  - (attributed) George a Greene, the Pinner of Wakefield published
- Ben Jonson – Every Man out of His Humour
- Hermann Kirchner – Coriolanus tragicomica
- John Marston – Antonio and Mellida
  - Histriomastix
  - Jack Drum's Entertainment
- Henry Porter – The Two Angry Women of Abingdon published
- William Shakespeare – As You Like It, Much Ado About Nothing, Henry V, and Julius Caesar (approximate date)

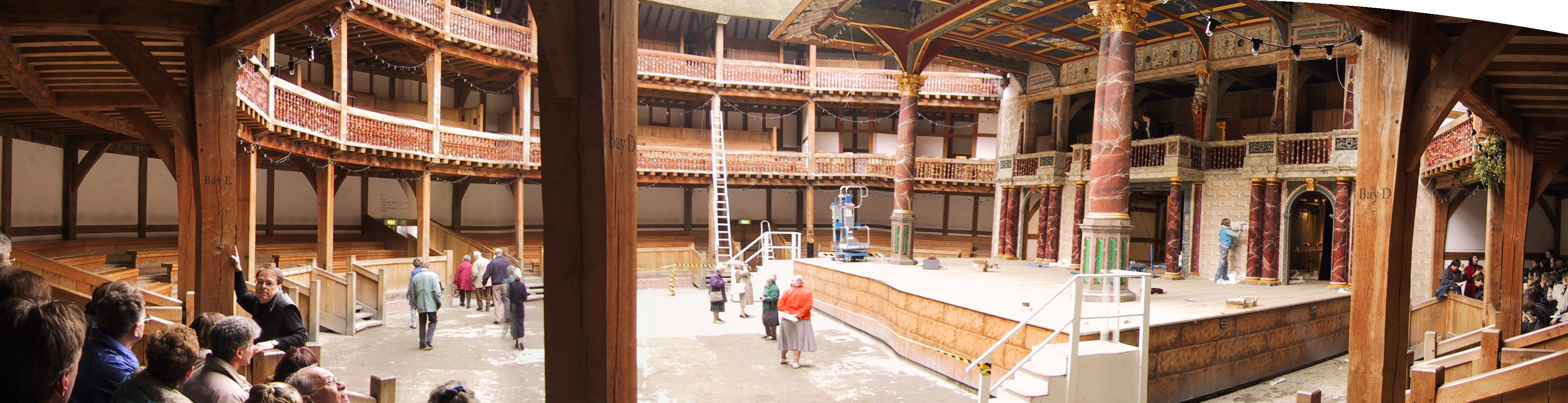
Shakespeare's Globe theatre (modern replica)

=== Poetry ===
- Samuel Daniel – Musophilus
- Sir John Davies
  - Hymnes of Astraea
  - Nosce Teipsum
- Thomas Middleton – Microcynicon: Six Snarling Satires
- George Peele – The Love of King David and Faire Bethsabe
- "W. Shakespeare" (and others unacknowledged) – The Passionate Pilgrime

== Births ==
- April 23 – Edward Sheldon, English translator of religious works (died 1687)
- May 30 – Samuel Bochart, French Biblical scholar (died 1667)
- July 23 – Stephanius, Danish royal historiographer (died 1650)
- August 14 – Méric Casaubon, English classicist (died 1671)
- October 31 – Denzil Holles, 1st Baron Holles, English statesman and writer (died 1680)
- unknown date
  - Madeleine de Souvré, marquise de Sablé, French writer of maxims (died 1678)
  - Zera Yacob, Ethiopian philosopher (died 1692)

== Deaths ==
- January 13 – Edmund Spenser, English poet (born 1552)
- June – Henry Porter, English dramatist
- October 9 – Reginald Scot, English writer on witchcraft (born c. 1538)
- October 18 – Daniel Adam z Veleslavína, Czech lexicographer (born 1546)
- November 29 – Christopher Barker, English printer to Queen Elizabeth I of England (born c. 1529)
- unknown dates
  - Jerónimo Bermúdez, Spanish dramatist (born 1530)
  - Dominicus Lampsonius, Flemish humanist poet (born 1532 in literature)
  - Philip Lonicer, German historian (unknown year of birth)
