= Elizabeth Hastings, Countess of Huntingdon =

English noblewoman and writer (1588–1633)

Elizabeth Stanley
- Countess of Huntingdon; Lady Hastings of Hungerford; Lady Botreaux
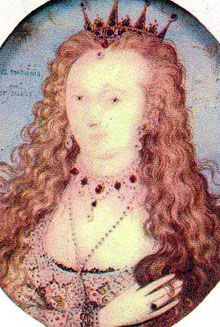
- Miniature portrait, c. 1601–1610
- Born: 6 January 1588; Knowsley Hall, Knowsley, England
- Died: 20 January 1633 (aged 45); Whitefriars, London, England
- Buried: Parish church of St. Helen, Ashby-de-la-Zouch, Leicestershire
- Noble family: Stanley
- Spouse: Henry Hastings, 5th Earl of Huntingdon
- Issue: Ferdinando Hastings, 6th Earl of Huntingdon; Lady Alice Hastings; Lady Elizabeth Hastings; Henry Hastings, 1st Baron Loughborough
- Father: Ferdinando Stanley, 5th Earl of Derby
- Mother: Alice Spencer
- Occupation: Writer

Elizabeth Hastings, Countess of Huntingdon (6 January 1588 – 20 January 1633), formerly Lady Elizabeth Stanley, was an English noblewoman and writer who was third in line of succession to the English throne. She was the wife of Henry Hastings, 5th Earl of Huntingdon. She was also styled Lady Hastings of Hungerford and Lady Botreaux as her husband held both of these titles in addition to the Earl of Huntingdon.

== In line to the English throne ==
Lady Elizabeth was born and baptised on 6 January 1588, in Knowsley, Lancashire, the third and youngest daughter, and co-heir of Ferdinando Stanley, 5th Earl of Derby, Lord of Mann, and Alice Spencer. As the great-great-granddaughter of Mary Tudor, Duchess of Suffolk, the younger sister of King Henry VIII, Elizabeth became, after the death of her grandmother, Lady Margaret Clifford in 1596, third in line of succession to the English throne. Upon the death of Queen Elizabeth I in 1603, Elizabeth and her older sisters, Anne Stanley, Countess of Castlehaven, heir presumptive, and Lady Frances Stanley, were passed over in favour of King James VI of Scotland, who was descended from King Henry's elder sister Margaret Tudor.

== Marriage and issue ==
On 15 January 1601, shortly after her 13th birthday, Lady Elizabeth married Henry Hastings, the only son of Francis Hastings, Baron Hastings, and Lady Sarah Harrington. As his father had died in 1595, Henry was heir to the earldom of Huntingdon. On 31 December 1604, upon the death of his grandfather George Hastings, 4th Earl of Huntingdon, he succeeded as the fifth earl. From that date onward, Lady Elizabeth was styled Countess of Huntingdon, as well as Lady Hastings of Hungerford and Lady Botreaux, since her husband also held those titles.

They made their principal home at Ashby de la Zouch Castle, Leicestershire, where the earls of Huntingdon had their family seat. Together Henry and Elizabeth had four children:

- Lady Elizabeth Hastings (born ca. 1605), married Sir Hugh Calverley; died childless.
- Lady Alice Hastings (1606–1667), married Sir Gervase Clifton, 1st Baronet, as his seventh wife; died childless.
- Ferdinando Hastings, 6th Earl of Huntingdon (18 January 1608 – 13 February 1655), married Lucy Davies, by whom he had issue.
- Lord Henry Hastings, 1st Baron Loughborough of Loughborough (28 September 1610 – 10 January 1667), died unmarried without issue.

== Writer and arts patron ==
Lady Elizabeth was a patron of the arts, as well as a writer. She was the author of five Huntington Library manuscripts: four copies of prayers, biblical extracts, and meditations, and one volume of sermon notes. Forty-six of her letters (written from 1605 until late 1632), which provide a keen insight into her life and personal sentiments, survive in the Hastings Collection of the Huntington Library. In one of these letters, she described a visit to the royal court where she watched the rehearsals and final production of a masque, at which she was kissed by both King James and Queen Anne. Elizabeth danced in The Masque of Queens which was performed at Whitehall Palace on 2 February 1609. A miniature portrait by Nicholas Hilliard was painted sometime between 1601 and 1610. She was also the subject of a portrait by Paul van Somer painted in about 1614.

== Masque at Ashby Castle ==
The countess employed John Marston to write an entertainment for her mother's visit to Ashby in August 1607. A triumphal arch was built in the park. A welcome speech was delivered by an actor dressed as a witch or "Inchantress" called Merimna. She claimed that Ashby was held by Melancholy and Desolation. Next Saturn, a god who represented melancholy, recognised the Countess of Derby. At the masque in the Great Chamber the moon goddess Cynthia was presented.

== Death ==
Elizabeth died on 20 January 1633, shortly after her 45th birthday, at Whitefriars, London, at the home of her brother-in-law, John Egerton, 1st Earl of Bridgewater. A procession took her body to the parish church of St. Helen in Ashby-de-la-Zouch where she was buried on 9 February. The minister praised her in conventional terms, but he also mentioned her literary activities. The four manuscripts of her religious writings represented her thoughts right up to her death; in three of her four manuscripts, her final meditation was Of Death. Her husband died 10 years later in 1643.

== Ancestry ==
Ancestors of Elizabeth Hastings, Countess of Huntingdon

Thomas Stanley, 2nd Earl of Derby
Edward Stanley, 3rd Earl of Derby
Anne Hastings
Henry Stanley, 4th Earl of Derby
Thomas Howard, 2nd Duke of Norfolk
Dorothy Howard
Agnes Tilney
Ferdinando Stanley, 5th Earl of Derby
Henry Clifford, 1st Earl of Cumberland
Henry Clifford, 2nd Earl of Cumberland
Margaret Percy
Lady Margaret Clifford
Charles Brandon, 1st Duke of Suffolk
Lady Eleanor Brandon
Mary Tudor, Queen of France
Lady Elizabeth Stanley
Sir John Spencer
Sir William Spencer
Isabel Grant
Sir John Spencer
Sir Richard Knightley
Susan Knightley
Jane Skenard
Alice Spencer
Robert Kytson
Sir Thomas Kitson
Katherine Kitson
