= Bishops' Ban of 1599 =

English church ban on a selection of literary works

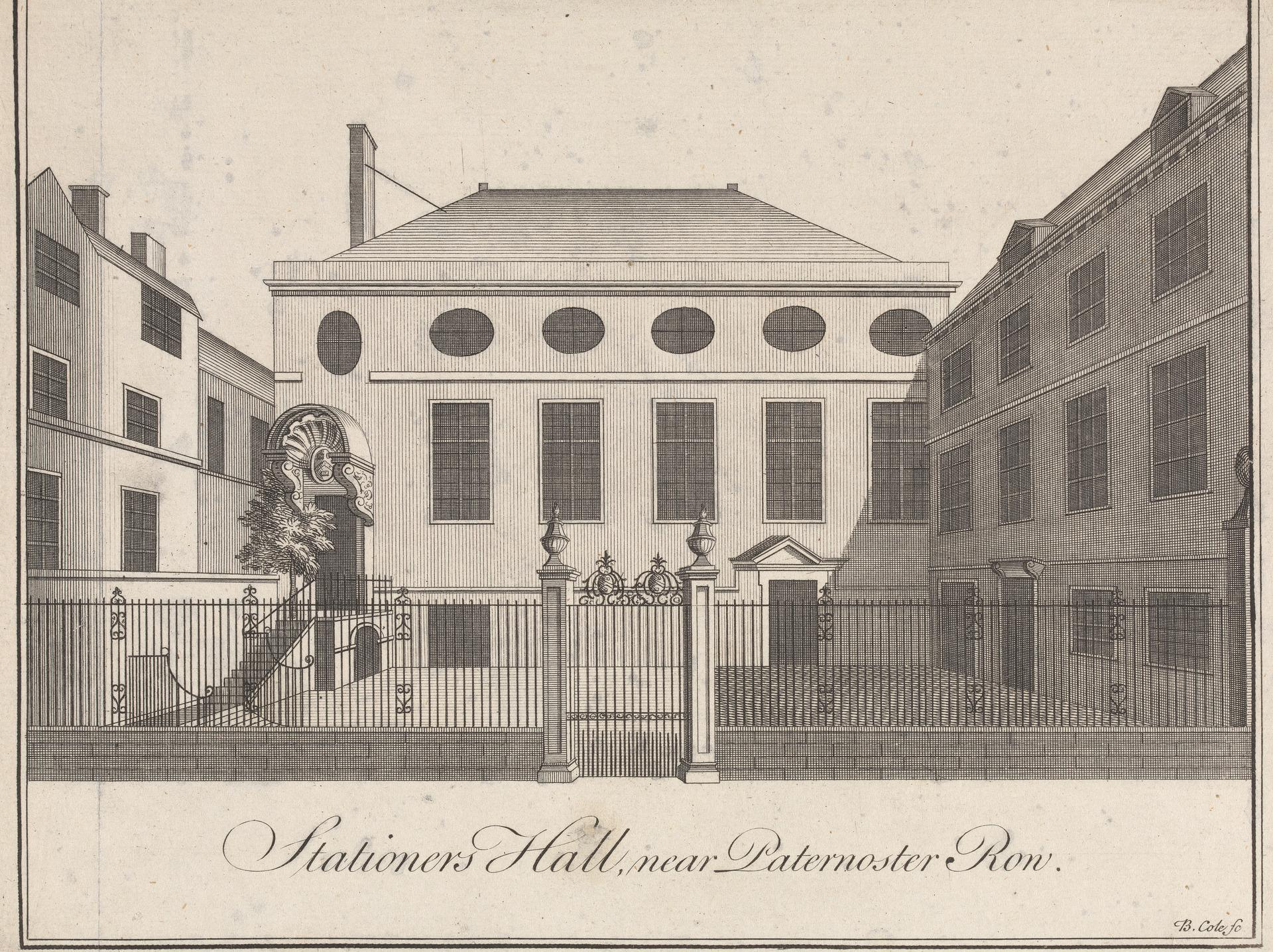
Stationer's Hall, off Paternoster Row, London, where the banned works were burned. (18th-century engraving by Benjamin Cole)

On 1 June 1599, Archbishop of Canterbury John Whitgift and Bishop of London Richard Bancroft ordered a ban on a selection of literary works. The works were brought to Stationer's Hall to be burned. This act of censorship has become known among scholars as the "Bishops' Ban" and is one of four such acts during the reign of Elizabeth I. Debora Shuger has called the order "the most sweeping and stringent instance of early modern censorship."

== Censored books ==
This "Bishops' Ban" has been documented in the surviving records of the Stationers' Company and can be observed in Edward Arber's transcription. It ordered the censorship of satires and epigrams, histories and dramatic works published without the approval of the Privy Council, and all the works by Thomas Nashe and Gabriel Harvey. Additionally, nine specific books were singled out for censorship:

- Joseph Hall, Vergidemiarum. 2 Vols. (1597–1598).
- John Marston, The Metamorphosis of Pigmalions Image and Certaine Satyres (1598)
- John Marston, The Scourge of Villanie (1598)
- Edward Guilpin, Skialetheia. or, A shadowe of Truth (1598)
- Thomas Middleton, Microcynicon: Six Snarling Satires (1599)
- T. Cutwode (pseud.), Caltha Poetarum: Or The Bumble Bee (1599)
- John Davies and Christopher Marlowe, Epigrammes and Elegies (1599)
- Ercole and Torquato Tasso, Of Mariage and Wiving, trans. Robert Tofte (1599)
- Anonymous, The xv ioyes of marriage (in modern English, The 15 joys of marriage)

The last work may be a translation from a French original, and is probably lost (although we know it was probably printed by Adam Islip, who was fined for printing the book on 5 February 1599). All the other books survive. Three days later, on 4 June, seven of the above titles were burned in Stationers' Hall. The two books that were "stai[e]d" (i.e. not burned) were Hall's Vergidemiarum and Caltha Poetarum.

The following year, poet John Weever published Faunus and Melliflora, which contains references to Joseph Hall, John Marston, and the Bishops' Ban. Weever is also the probable author of an anonymous pamphlet in 1601 entitled The Whippinge of the Satyre, which vindicates the decision of the bishops and attacks Edward Guilpin, John Marston, and Ben Jonson.

The list of books is worded as follows (from Arber's translation):

Satyres tearmed Halls Satyres, viz' Virgidemiarum, or his toothless or bitinge Satyres
Pigmalion with certaine other Satyres
The scourge of villanye
The Shadowe of truthe in Epigrams and Satyres
Snarlinge Satyres
Caltha Poetarum
Davyes Epigrams, with marlowes Elegyes
The booke againste woemen, viz'; of miarriage and wyvinge
The xv ioyes of marriage
That noe Satyres or Epigramms be printed hereafter
That noe English historyes bee printed excepte they bee allowed by somme of her maiesties privie Counsell
That noe playes bee printed excepte they bee allowed by such as have auctoritie
That all NASSHes bookes and Doctor HARVYes bookes be taken wheresouer they maye be found and that none of theire bookes bee euer printed hereafter
That thoughe any booke of the nature of theise heretofore expressed shalbe broughte unto yow under the hands of the Lord Archbisshop of Canterburye or the Lord Bishop of London yet the said booke shall not bee printed until the master or wardens have acquainted the said lord Archbishop, or the Lord Bishop with the same, to knowe whether it be theire hand or no
John cantuar
Richard London
Suche bookes as can be found or are already taken of the Argumentes aforesaid or any of the bookes above expressed lett them bee presentlye broughte to the Bishop of London to be burnte

== Theories about the Ban ==
It is not entirely clear what reason or reasons prompted the ban and the subsequent book burning. Nevertheless, there are three general theories that attempt to explain the controversy.

The first of these supposes that the ban was simply a response to satirical writing that was getting out of hand. Richard McCabe refers to the ban as an effort to target social critique that was "too close to the truth for comfort." More recently, William Jones contends that the bishops' primary concern was the satirists' harsh, Juvenalian approach to social commentary.

An alternative theory on the event supposes that Archbishop Whitgift engineered the ban specifically to protect his friend the Robert Devereux, favourite of Queen Elizabeth I, from political satire. This nuanced, political interpretation points out that Essex's failure during a military campaign in Ireland had recently captured the attention of the English public, and figures that the banned books seize upon this controversy. Because Robert Tofte's Of Mariage and Wiving and the anonymous xv ioyes of marriage are literary translations that do not directly relate to England's contemporary political climate, some scholars suppose that the anti-marriage rhetoric of these two books was perceived as sedition against Elizabeth I.

A third explanation for the ban reasons that the bishops were reacting specifically to the malicious and pornographic content in the books, as opposed to their generic or political implications. Charles Gillett argues that the seven books were burned "because of their offence against morality." Lynda Boose has claimed further that the bishops "attempted to cut off the hostile, malcontented political aggressions of the violently sexualized discourse they heard in these new hybrid literary constructions."
