= Henry Hastings, 5th Earl of Huntingdon =

English nobleman and literary patron (1586–1643)

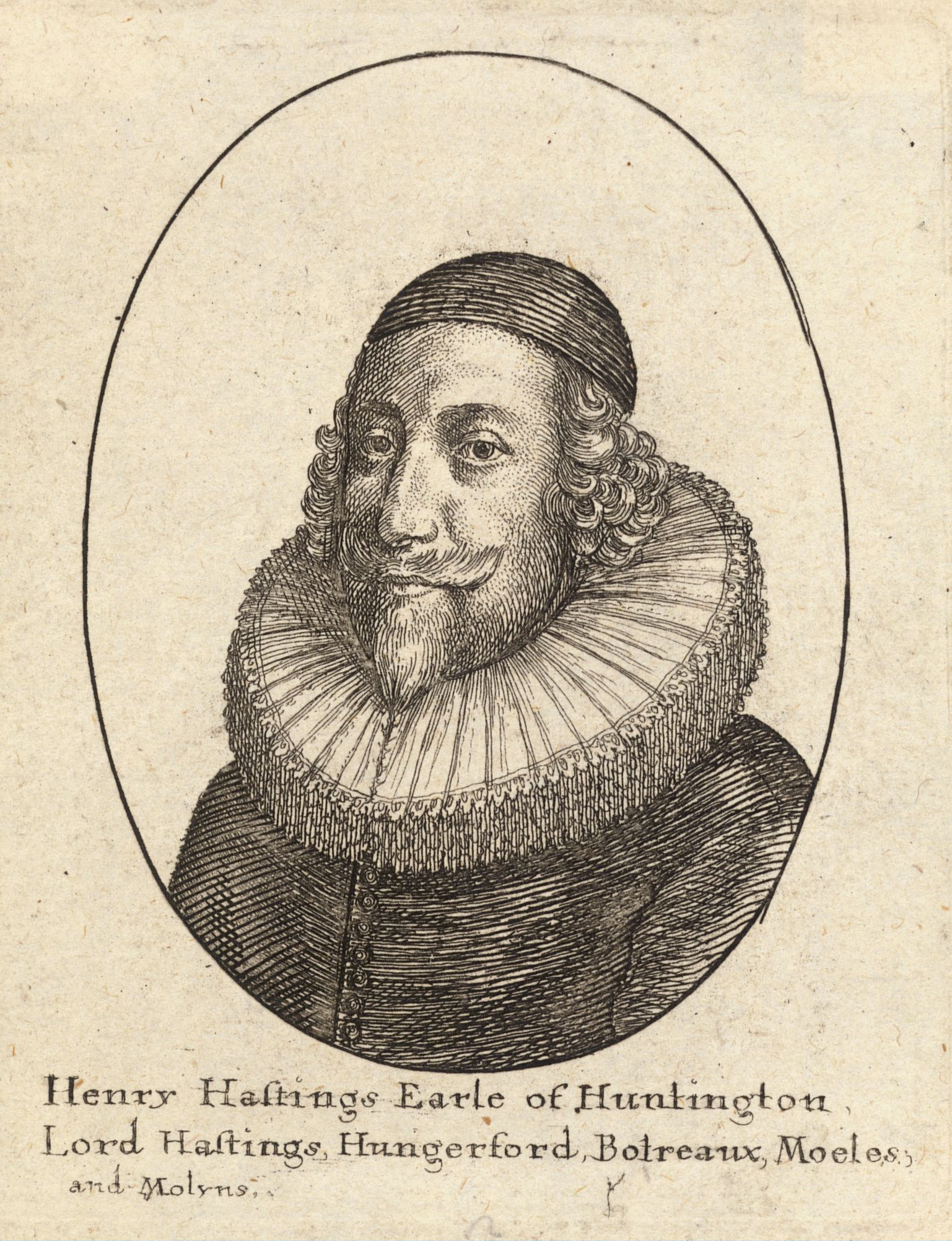
The Earl of Huntingdon.

Henry Hastings, 5th Earl of Huntingdon (24 April 1586 – 14 November 1643), was a prominent English nobleman and literary patron in England during the first half of the seventeenth century.

== Life ==
He was born at Ashby-de-la-Zouch, Leicestershire, the one of three sons of Francis Hastings, Baron Hastings, and Lady Sarah Harington. Henry was a great-great-great-grandson of Margaret Pole, Countess of Salisbury.

Henry Hastings was educated at Gray's Inn. In 1595, Henry's father, Francis, died, and Hastings was next to succeed his grandfather, George Hastings, 4th Earl of Huntingdon, which on 31 December 1604, he did. In 1607, at the age of 21, Hastings commanded forces in the suppression of the Midland Revolt. Throughout his maturity the 5th Earl served in a wide range of offices in the counties of Leicestershire, Lancashire, and Rutland, including Lord Lieutenant of Leicester and Rutland, 1614–42. He was also a member of the Virginia Company.

The Earls of Huntingdon were traditionally patrons of the town of Leicester and involved in its governance. However, Huntingdon became involved in a lawsuit and in 1606 the town did not send him a customary New Year's gift. The Earl was offended, and in 1607 the townspeople sent his wife a gift of a horse to try to patch things up. The Earl, still offended, asked the Countess to refuse the horse, and the rift continued for a year.

== Marriage ==
On 15 January 1601, he married Lady Elizabeth Stanley (1588–1633), the third and youngest daughter of Ferdinando Stanley, 5th Earl of Derby, and Lady Alice Spencer. His wife was a great-great-granddaughter of Mary Tudor, Duchess of Suffolk. She, at one time, was third-in-line to succeed to the throne of England. However, Mary pre-deceased her brother Henry VIII and her descendants were passed over for James VI of Scotland.

They maintained their country seat at Ashby-de-la-Zouch castle in Leicestershire and together had four children:

- Lady Alice Hastings (1606–1667), married Sir Gervase Clifton, 1st Baronet; died childless.
- Ferdinando Hastings, 6th Earl of Huntingdon (18 January 1609 – 13 February 1655), married Lucy Davies, by whom he had issue.
- Lord Henry Hastings, 1st Baron Loughborough, of Loughborough (28 September 1610 – 10 January 1667), had issue.
- Lady Elizabeth Hastings (born ca. 1605), married Sir Hugh Calverley; died childless.

== Patronage ==
Though a recognized leader of the Puritan movement and a critic of the policies of the House of Stuart, Hastings was also a patron of stage drama, comparable to his contemporaries the Earls of Pembroke—William Herbert, 3rd Earl, and Philip Herbert, 4th Earl. Hastings was known as the most important aristocratic patron of the playwrights Francis Beaumont and John Fletcher. (Hastings and Beaumont were distant cousins.) Hastings patronized other dramatists of the era as well, including John Marston, who wrote the masque at Ashby Castle performed in 1607.

Upon his death in 1643, Henry Hastings was succeeded by his eldest son, Ferdinando Hastings, as 6th Earl.

== Sources ==
- Doyle, James William Edmund. The Official Baronage of England. London, Longmans, Green, 1886.
- Finkelpearl, Philip J. Court and Country Politics in the Plays of Beaumont and Fletcher. Princeton, NJ, Princeton University Press, 1990.
- McMullan, Gordon. The Politics of Unease in the Plays of John Fletcher. Amherst, MA, University of Massachusetts Press, 1994.

Political offices
Vacant Title last held by The Earl of Huntingdon	Lord Lieutenant of Leicestershire jointly with Lord Hastings 1638–1643; 1607–1643	Succeeded by The Earl of Huntingdon (Royalist)
Preceded by Sir Henry Beaumont	Custos Rotulorum of Leicestershire c.1607–1643	Succeeded by The Earl of Huntingdon (Royalist)
Preceded by The Lord Harington of Exton	Lord Lieutenant of Rutland jointly with Lord Hastings 1638–1643; 1614–1643	Succeeded by The Earl of Huntingdon (Royalist)
Peerage of England
Preceded by George Hastings	Earl of Huntingdon; 1604–1643	Succeeded by Ferdinando Hastings
Preceded by George Hastings	Baron Hastings (descended by acceleration); 1604–1640	Succeeded by Ferdinando Hastings
