= John Weever =

English antiquary and poet (1576–1632)

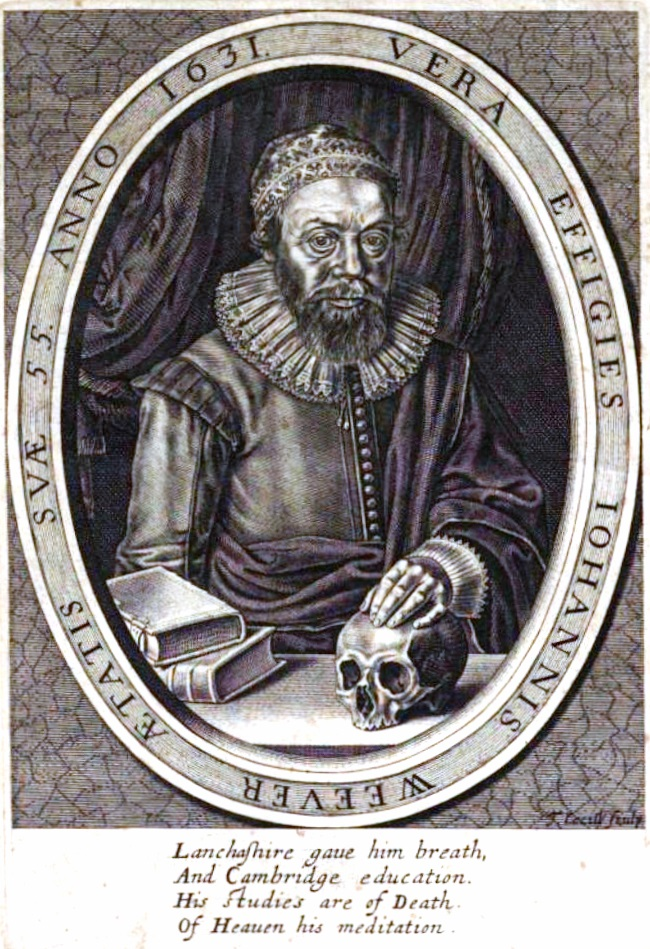
John Weever in 1631

John Weever (1576–1632) was an English antiquary and poet. He is best known for his Epigrammes in the Oldest Cut, and Newest Fashion (1599), containing epigrams on Shakespeare, Ben Jonson, and other poets of his day, and for his Ancient Funerall Monuments, the first full-length book to be dedicated to the topic of English church monuments and epitaphs, which was published in 1631, the year before his death.

== Life ==
Weever was a native of Preston, Lancashire. Little is known of his early life, and his parentage is not certain. He may be the son of the John Weever who in 1590 was one of thirteen followers of local landowner Thomas Langton put on trial for murder after a riot which took place at Lea Hall, Lancashire.

He was educated at Queens' College, Cambridge, where he was admitted as a sizar on 30 April 1594. Weever's first tutor at Cambridge was William Covell, himself a native of Lancashire and author of Polimanteia (1595) which contains one of the first printed notices of Shakespeare. Another of Weever's tutors was Robert Pearson, whom in later life he mentions with gratitude as a "reverend, learned divine". It is possible that Weever considered a career in the church himself but after receiving his degree on 16 April 1598 he appears to have left Cambridge and travelled to London, where he immersed himself in the literary scene.

He was in York in 1603 and later apparently in Lancashire. However, he eventually settled in London and married, buying a house in the parish of St. James, Clerkenwell.

== Works ==
In late 1599 Weever published Epigrammes in the Oldest Cut, and Newest Fashion, containing epigrams on Shakespeare, Samuel Daniel, Michael Drayton, Ben Jonson, Edmund Spenser, William Warner and Christopher Middleton, all of which are valuable to the literary historian. The epigram on Shakespeare is particularly interesting since it follows the typical Shakespearean sonnet form: this may indicate Weever had seen actual examples of Shakespeare's sonnets, which at that date circulated only in manuscript. Many other epigrams however relate to persons Weever knew at Cambridge and presumably were composed while he was still a student there. The book also has commendatory verses by some of Weever's Cambridge friends.

In 1600 he published Faunus and Melliflora, which begins as an erotic poem in the style of Shakespeare's Venus and Adonis and after a thousand lines in this vein abruptly veers toward satire, with a description of the mythological origins of the form and translations of satires by classical authors. It concludes with references to contemporary satirists Joseph Hall and John Marston, and also to the Bishops' Ban of 1599, which ordered the calling in and destruction of satirical works by Thomas Nashe and others.

In 1601 an anonymous pamphlet called The Whippinge of the Satyre was published, which attacks three figures referred to as the Epigrammatist, the Satirist and the Humorist. These three are taken to refer to the contemporary writers Everard Guilpin, author of Skialetheia. or, A shadowe of Truth (1598), his kinsman John Marston, and Ben Jonson. It has been convincingly argued that Weever was the author of this pamphlet, and that as a result he was attacked in his turn and lampooned onstage as the character Asinius Bubo in Thomas Dekker's Satiromastix, as Simplicius Faber in Marston's What You Will and as Shift in Jonson's Every Man Out of His Humour. All these three characters are represented as being very small in stature and great lovers of tobacco, two characteristics which Weever himself admits to in his later works.

In 1601 Weever also published two more serious works of a religious tone, The Mirror of Martyrs and An Agnus Dei. The Mirror of Martyrs or The Life and Death of ... Sir John Oldcastle may have been part of a backlash. In his preface Weever calls it the "first trew Oldcastle", perhaps because Shakespeare's character Falstaff first appeared as "Sir John Oldcastle". Weever's work is influenced by John Bale's 1544 biography of Oldcastle, which presents him as a proto-Protestant martyr. In the fourth stanza of this long poem, in which Sir John is his own panegyrist, occurs a reminiscence of Shakespeare's Julius Caesar which serves to fix the date of the play. Weever's other work of this year, An Agnus Dei, is the life of Christ told in verse form. It has little literary merit but went through several editions, perhaps because it was produced as a tiny book less than two inches square.

The Mirror of Martyrs was reprinted in 1872 for the Roxburghe Club.

== Ancient Funerall Monuments ==
As early as his first publication in 1599 Weever had demonstrated an interest in tomb monuments. Developing this, he spent the first three decades of the seventeenth century collecting monumental inscriptions. He travelled throughout England and to parts of Scotland, France, the Low Countries and Italy. Back in England he made friends among the chief antiquaries of his time, including Sir Robert Cotton and the herald Augustine Vincent. The result of his endeavours appeared as Ancient Funerall Monuments, a folio volume published in 1631.

The work included a lengthy introductory global overview of his subject, the "Discourse of Funerall Monuments"; and this was followed by a survey of over a thousand inscriptions in the four south-eastern dioceses of England: Canterbury, Rochester, London and Norwich. The book is particularly valuable on account of the subsequent loss of many of these inscriptions. However, Weever viewed the inscriptions primarily as literary survivals, and (unlike some of his contemporaries) took little interest in the genealogical evidence they provided, or in the heraldic elements of many monuments: Graham Parry comments, "[i]t is fair to say that he ignored half the value of a memorial." Nor was he concerned with their sculptural or architectural features, and he made no drawings on his travels. The published volume contains just eighteen illustrative woodcuts, all of which appear to have been added only at the production stage, and to have been based on drawings supplied by antiquarian friends.

The Society of Antiquaries holds two notebooks in Weever's own hand (MSS 127 and 128) which contain a partial early draft of Ancient Funerall Monuments, as well as other material not included in the published volume.

== Death and commemoration ==
Weever died between mid-February and late March 1632, and was buried at St James, Clerkenwell. He was commemorated by a marble tablet framed with a black border, and inscribed with a lengthy encomium in verse (afterwards published in the 1633 edition of John Stow's Survey of London). The monument was lost when the church was demolished for rebuilding in 1788, despite some ineffectual efforts by the Society of Antiquaries to preserve it.

The engraved frontispiece to Ancient Funerall Monuments includes a portrait of Weever, giving his age as 55; and also the following self-penned doggerel summary of his life:

Lanchashire gave him breath,
And Cambridge education.
His studies are of Death.
Of Heaven his meditation.

== Personal life ==
Weever's wife's first name was Anne, but it is unclear from the surviving records whether she was Anne Edwards, who married a man named John Weaver in St James Church, Clerkenwell, in 1614; Anne Panting, who married a John Weaver in the same church in 1617; or neither of these. She may have been the Anne Weaver of Clerkenwell who drew up her will in 1647, and whose maiden name may have been Onion.
