= Robert Tofte =

16th/17th-century English poet and translator

- Born: 1562
- Died: January 1620 (age 57); Holborn, London, England
- Resting place: St Andrew, Holborn
- Education: Oxford University
- Occupations: translator and poet
- Writing career
- Language: Early Modern English
- Period: Elizabethan era–Jacobean era
- Genre: verse
- Subjects: love, marriage, jealousy, The Woman Question

Robert Tofte (bap. 1562 – d. Jan. 1620) was an English translator and poet. He is known for his translations of Ariosto's Satires and his sonnet sequences Alba, The Months Minde of a Melancholy Lover (1598) and Laura, The Toyes of a Traveller: Or, The Feast of Fancie (1597). He also authored a partial translation of Boiardo's Orlando Innamorato and was possibly responsible for the popular and anonymous Batchelar's Banquet (1603) as well. Tofte is perhaps most famous for his incidental reference to Love's Labour's Lost in Alba, the first mention of that Shakespeare play in print.

== Life ==
Born the son of a fishmonger, Tofte eventually moved in aristocratic and literary circles and invariably presented himself as "R. T. Gentleman" on the title pages of his published works. He studied at Oxford beginning in 1582 and travelled in France and Italy between 1591 and 1594, where he perfected his Italian and French and possibly met Samuel Daniel and Giovanni Battista Guarini. His reference to Love's Labour's Lost demonstrates his familiarity with Shakespeare. Though no student of law, Tofte kept his lodgings in Holborn near London's Inns of Court, societies that included Edmund Spenser, John Harington, and John Marston as members.

He was known familiarly among his friends as "Robin Redbreast," and his works contain frequent allusions to this nickname. Tofte's work also reveals an interest in The Woman Question, and some critics have labelled him a misogynist on account of the works he chose to translate.

Tofte died in the house of a Mrs. Goodall in Holborn in January 1620, and was buried on 24 January in the church of St. Andrew, Holborn. In his lengthy will, one sees both a wealthy aristocrat and a penitent Protestant believer.

== Critical appraisal ==
Generations of critics have repeatedly characterised Tofte as a "minor Elizabethan," but he added productively to the cultures of literary translation and continental interest in Renaissance England.

Although Tofte's original poetry lacks the brilliance of his contemporaries, his translations are remarkable in their imagination, their sophistication, and their fidelity. Rather than literally conveying the content of the text or imposing a moralistic interpretation of his own, he often enhances and enriches it in a way that qualifies his misogynistic reputation. Tofte's efforts to "English" works from both French and Italian also demonstrate a critical and undervalued aspect of literary translation: exercise in language-learning.

== Works ==
=== Original works ===
- Laura. The Toyes of a Traueller. Or, The Feast of Fancie. London: Valentine Sims, 1597.

Dedicated Lady Lucy Percy, this book consists of a collection of short poems "most parte conceiued in Italie, and some of them brought foorth in England." It also contains more than thirty sonnets stated in "A Frends iust excuse" to be by another hand, though they are stylistically indistinguishable from the others. The collection borrows its title directly from the beloved lady of Petrarch. Laura was edited by Jeffrey Nelson and republished in his The Poetry of Robert Tofte 1597–1620 (1994).

- Alba. The Months Minde of a Melancholy Louer, divided into three parts. London: Felix Kingston for Matthew Lownes, 1598.

It is dedicated to Mistress Anne Herne, but the true "Laura" or "Alba" (Tofte's muse) appears to have been a lady of the name Caryll. This work includes the first reference to William Shakespeare's play Love's Labour's Lost in print: "LOVES LABOURS LOST, I once did see a Play, / Ycleped so, so called to my paine" (third part, stanza 81). Alba was edited and republished by Alexander Balloch Grosart in 1880. It is also included in Nelson's Poetry of Robert Tofte.

- "Three Elegies"

Appended to the 1611 edition of Ariosto's Satires. No such elegies by Ariosto exist, and the attribution may be a publisher's error. Though they could be based on Italian originals, these elegies are likely Tofte's compositions, and contain the "laments of three unsuccessful lovers."

- "The Fruits of Jealousie: or, A Loue (but not louing) Letter."

Appended to Tofte's translation of Benedetto Varchi's Blazon of Jealousie (1615). In the poem, the speaker complains about his ungrateful beloved's disdain for the many gifts, trinkets, and foods he offers her. He sings the refrain that he is forced to wear the "Willow Garland."

=== Translations ===
- Two Tales Translated out of Ariosto. The one in dispraise of Men, the other in disgrace of Women. London: Valentine Sims, 1597.

This was the first of Tofte's published translations from the Italian. Both episodes derive from Canto XLIII of Orlando Furioso (stanzas 11 and 73) and both were composed in Italy. Tofte supplies the first line of each passage in the Italian original. The book survives in a unique copy at the Folger Shakespeare Library in Washington, DC.

- Orlando Innamorato. The three first Bookes of that famous noble Gentleman and learned Poet Mathew Maria Boiardo. London: Valentine Sims, 1598.

The popularity of Orlando Furioso probably drew Tofte to the Boiardo poem that inspired Ariosto. Despite the title page, Tofte translates not the first three books of the Innamorato, but rather the first three cantos of the first book. Tofte maintains the centrality of the theme of love in the poem and even accentuates the eroticism in Boiardo's original. It was dedicated to Lady Margaret, wife of Sir John Morgan of Chilworth, Surrey.

- Of Mariage and Wiuing. An excellent, pleasant, and Philosophicall Controuersie, betweene the famous Tassi now liuing, the one Hercules the Philosopher, the other Torquato the Poet. London: Thomas Creede for John Smythicke, 1599.

In this work, "The Declamation ... against Marriage or wedding of a Wife" is by Ercole Tasso, and the "Defence" is by Torquato Tasso. Of all Tofte's books, this was the most controversial. Less than three months after it was entered into the Stationers' Register, it was burned by the Bishops of London and Canterbury on 4 June 1599 in an act now known as the Bishops' Ban of 1599. The bishops labelled the work as "the booke againste woemen," probably for the exaggerated misogyny in Ercole's declamation.

- Ariosto's Satyres, in seuen famous Discourses... London: Nicholas Okes for Roger Jackson, 1608.

Though the title page of this book indicates Gervase Markham as author, Tofte would later claim it three times in his translation of The Blazon of Jealousie. According to surviving evidence, these claims were never disputed, and moreover, the book was reissued by the same publisher in 1611 with Markham's name removed. The ascription to Markham could either be fraud on the part of the publisher Roger Jackson or could indicate a lost or stolen manuscript The fourth satire on the subject of marriage perhaps attracted Tofte's interest most; as a whole, the book delivers an autobiographical picture of an author who interested many English readers.

- Honours Academie. Or the Famous Pastorall of the faire Shepheardesse, Julietta. Translated from the French original by Nicolas de Montreux. London: Thomas Creede, 1610.

This work of over 350 folio pages was attributed to Gervase Markham in the Stationer's Register, but was properly assigned to Tofte in print. The book is dedicated to Lady Anne Herne, who had already received commendatory poems from the author in Alba. An interminable romance, it is nevertheless faithful to Montreux's original Cinquiesme et Dernier Liure des Bergeries de Iulliette (Paris, 1598). The verse is cumbersome. Lacking patience to read it in its entirety, Alexander B. Grosart declared, "it beat me." However, others have suggested it influenced Shakespeare's The Tempest.

- The Blazon of Jealousie. Translated from the Italian original by Benedetto Varchi. London: Thomas Snodham for John Busbie, 1615.

This last publication by Tofte is perhaps most interesting for its discursive annotations, which often dominate the text of Varchi's lecture on jealousy (Tofte used the Mantuan edition of 1545). They recall the extensive notes on the earlier Ariosto's Satyres, and may anticipate the modern footnote. Tofte's translation supplies full translations of ten sonnets and canzoni by Petrarch, and comments on George Turbervile and George Gascoigne. Robert Burton found Tofte's translation of the Blazon extremely useful for quotations as he composed The Anatomy of Melancholy

=== Unpublished and doubtful works ===
- A Discourse of the fiue laste Popes of Rome... Unpublished manuscript, 1598.

Tofte's unpublished manuscript contains a survey of the recent papacy and is based on an account by Bartolomeo Platina published in 1594. It also contains a history of "that famous Pilgrimage of our Ladie of Loreto" and a chronicle of all living cardinals. It is held in the collections at Lambeth Palace today, although Robert Melzi has completed a modern transcription of the work. Strangely, the manuscript was dedicated to Richard Bancroft, the church authority who would burn Tofte's Of Mariage and Wiuing a year later.

- The Batchelar's Banquet, or a Banquet for Batchelars. London: Thomas Creede for Thomas Pavier, 1603.

This book saw great demand, and was printed at least three more times before the end of the seventeenth century. Its lively speech, misogynistic content, and its black-letter typeface seem to recall Of Mariage and Wiuing. Indeed, F.P. Wilson suggested that this anonymous translation of the French Les Quinze Joyes de Mariage might belong among Tofte's works, though "the evidence is too slight to assign the work to his pen." It remains uncertain whether or not it belongs to Tofte.

== Bibliography ==
- Edward Arber, ed. A Transcript of the Registers of the Company of Stationers, 1554–1640. 1875–1894. 5 vols.
- C.A.O. Fox, Notes on William Shakespeare and Robert Tofte. 1957.
- Alexander Balloch Grosart, Introduction to his edition of Tofte's Alba, 1880.
- Robert Melzi, ed. Robert Tofte's "Discourse" to the Bishop of London. 1989.
- Jeffrey N. Nelson, The Poetry of Robert Tofte 1597–1620: A Critical Old-Spelling Edition, 1994.
- Selene Scarsi, Translating Women in Early Modern England, 2010.
- Franklin B. Williams, Jr., "Robert Tofte", Review of English Studies 13.51 (1937): 282–296; 404–24.
- Franklin B. Williams, Jr., "Robert Tofte an Oxford Man", Review of English Studies 6.22 (1950): 177–79.

Attribution

This article incorporates text from a publication now in the public domain: "Tofte, Robert". Dictionary of National Biography. London: Smith, Elder & Co. 1885–1900.
