= What You Will =

1601 play by John Marston

What You Will is a late Elizabethan comedy by John Marston, written in 1601 and probably performed by the Children of Paul's, one of the companies of boy actors popular in that period.

The play was entered into the Stationers' Register on 6 August 1607, and was published later that year in a quarto printed by George Eld for the bookseller Thomas Thorpe. Inconsistencies in the names of the characters suggest that the play was revised between its stage premier in 1601 and its publication in 1607. The Induction that precedes the text mentions a small sized stage and candles for illumination, details that verify that the play was acted in a smaller "private" theatre rather than a large "public" one like the Globe or the Fortune.

The play focuses on the relationship between two rival poets: the bitter, misanthropic satirist Lampatho Doria and the generous, lighthearted epicurean Quadratus. The play itself hardly has a plot, being more a series of comic vignettes and debates between characters. It criticizes the satirist as a mean-spirited, envious man, and celebrates good humor, merriment and "play." The subplot involves the tricking and humiliation of various fools by a group of boy pages.

What You Will was one of the plays involved in the War of the Theatres in 1599–1601. The character Lampatho Doria is generally thought to represent Ben Jonson, Marston's opponent in the controversy, while Quadratus may stand in for Marston himself.
