= Henry Hastings, 1st Baron Loughborough =

English Royalist army commander

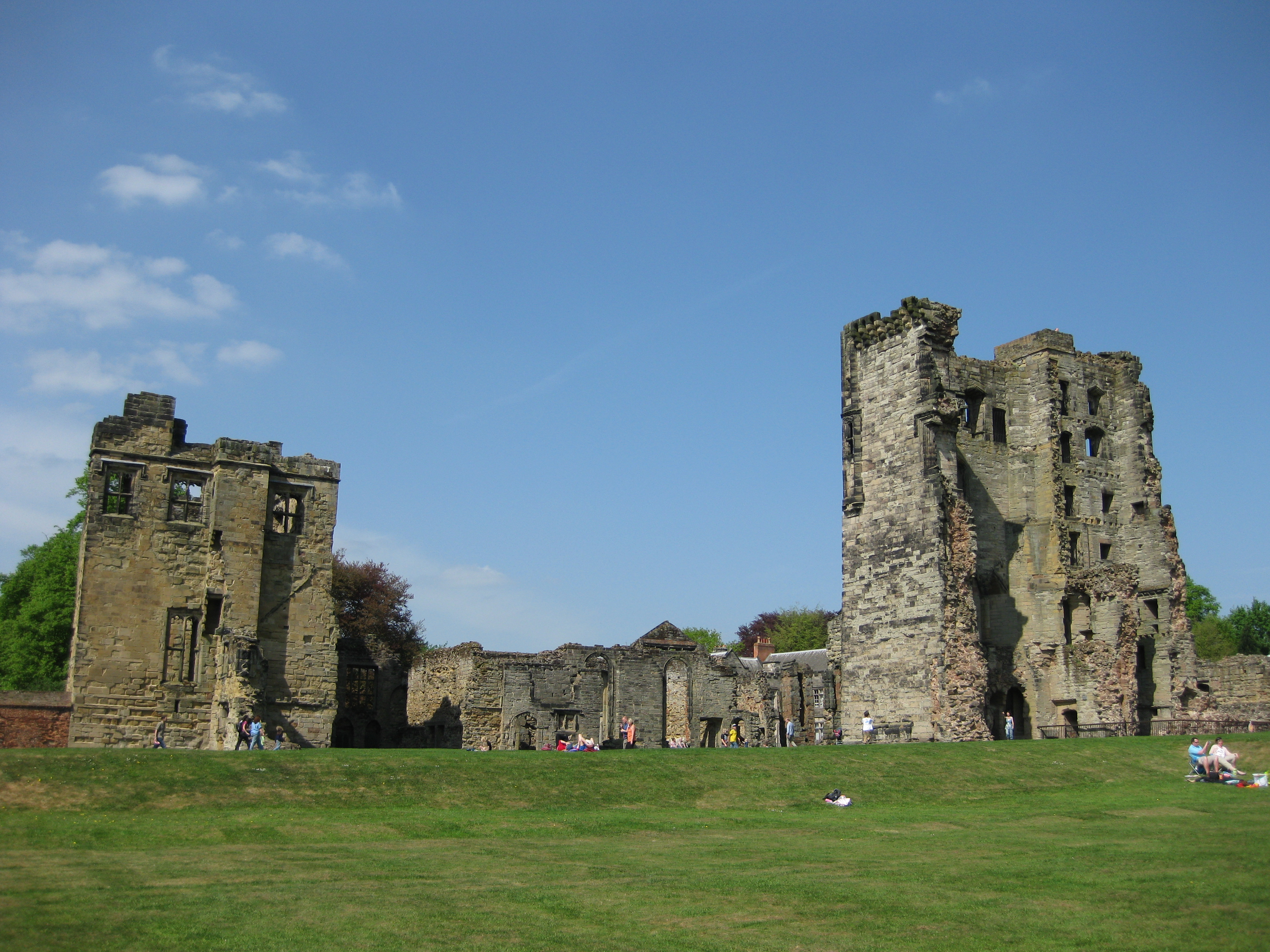
- Ashby de la Zouch Castle; the family home which Hastings held for Charles I during the First English Civil War

Custos Rotulorum & Lord Lieutenant of Leicestershire
- In office 1661 – 1667 †

Royalist High Sheriff of Leicestershire
- In office 1642–1643

Personal details
- Born: 28 September 1610 Ashby de la Zouch Castle
- Died: 10 January 1667 (aged 56) Lambeth, London
- Resting place: St George's Chapel, Windsor Castle
- Education: Queens' College, Cambridge

Military service
- Rank: Colonel
- Commands: Royalist military commander, Leicestershire, Nottinghamshire, and Derbyshire
- Battles/wars: Wars of the Three Kingdoms; Powick Bridge; Edgehill; Hopton Heath; Siege of Lichfield; Cotes Bridge; Relief of Newark; Storming of Leicester; Stow-on-the-Wold; Siege of Colchester

Henry Hastings, 1st Baron Loughborough (28 September 1610 – 10 January 1667), was the younger son of Henry Hastings, 5th Earl of Huntingdon, one of the most powerful landowners in Leicestershire. He fought with the Royalist army in the Wars of the Three Kingdoms, and narrowly escaped execution after being captured at Colchester in 1648. He spent the next twelve years with the Stuart court in exile, and became a leading member of the Sealed Knot, a body set up to co-ordinate Royalist plots against The Protectorate. Hastings returned home after the 1660 Stuart Restoration, and was appointed Lord Lieutenant of Leicestershire in 1661, a position he retained until his death in January 1667.

== Personal details ==
Henry Hastings was born 28 September 1610 at Ashby de la Zouch Castle, the family home in Leicestershire, fifth child and second son of Henry Hastings, 5th Earl of Huntingdon (1586–1643), and his wife Elizabeth (1588–1633). His siblings included, Lady Alice Hastings, Ferdinando Hastings, 6th Earl of Huntingdon (b. 1608), Lady Elizabeth Hastings and Lady Mary Hastings (b. 1612). His mother, at one time, was fourth-in-line to inherit England's throne. She was a great-great-granddaughter of Mary Tudor, Duchess of Suffolk.

He was educated at Queens' College, Cambridge. Upon the outbreak of the Civil War in 1642, Hastings declared himself a supporter of King Charles I and the family home, Ashby-de-la-Zouch castle, became a vital link between the Royalist south-west and the north – particularly as much of the rest of Leicestershire supported the Parliamentary cause. Hastings was made High Sheriff of Leicestershire that same year (1642) by King Charles.

Hastings, therefore, as Colonel Hastings, became engaged in various skirmishes between the opposing forces, seeing action at the Battle of Hopton Heath, fighting a small battle at Cotes Bridge near Loughborough and later losing an eye to a pistol shot after an exchange near Bagworth, all in 1643. He was thereafter known as Blind Henry Hastings by the Parliamentarians, who refused to recognise his new title. Later that year, his forces captured and lost the town of Burton upon Trent.

In May 1645 Hastings supported Prince Rupert in the siege and the storming of Leicester and was subsequently appointed the governor of Leicester by the King on 2 June. Following the Royalist defeat at the Battle of Naseby the Royalist garrison at Leicester was itself besieged by the parliamentarian general Sir Thomas Fairfax. After a brief siege Hastings negotiated articles of surrender and the garrison marched out of Leicester on 18 June.

As the war progressed and Royalist fortunes waned, Ashby—already the target of action in 1644—was subject to a prolonged siege between September 1645 and its surrender in March 1646. Hastings, ennobled as the first Baron Loughborough on 23 October 1643, for his services to Charles I, marched out with the honours of war. The castle was later partly demolished, with the remaining Hastings family moving to Donington Hall near Derby.

In the Second Civil War he and Arthur, Lord Capell in raising troops for the Royalists, joined the Earl of Norwich, Sir Charles Lucas and Sir George Lisle in Essex and took part in the Siege of Colchester. He surrendered with the others on 28 August 1648 and was exiled by Parliament (he fled to Holland) on 18 November 1648. In this he was fortunate as Capell, Lucas and Lisle were all executed for their part in the rebellion.

Upon the Restoration (for which he had worked secretly as a founder member of The Sealed Knot), Hastings was able to return to England and was appointed Lord Lieutenant of Leicestershire in 1661 although he only ever lived in London from then on, in a Manor House in Lambeth Wick he renamed Loughborough House. He died in 1667.

Several streets and a railway station in the Brixton area of London perpetuate his name.

Honorary titles
English Interregnum	Lord Lieutenant of Leicestershire; 1661–1667	Succeeded by The Earl of Rutland
English Interregnum	Custos Rotulorum of Leicestershire; 1661–1667	Succeeded by The Earl of Denbigh
Peerage of England
New creation	Baron Loughborough; 1643–1667	Extinct
