= Histriomastix (play) =

1599 play by John Marston

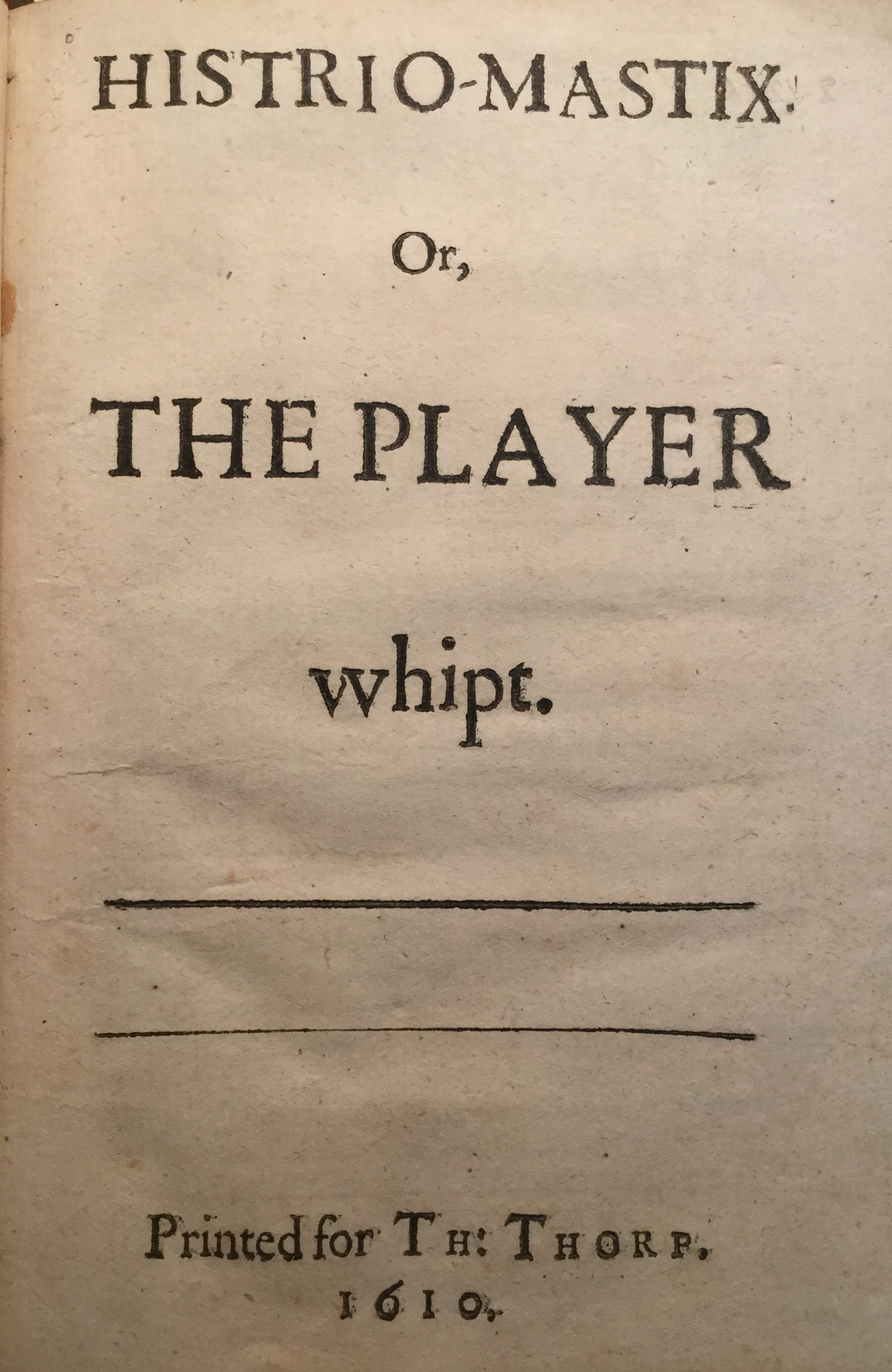
Title page of Histrio-mastix (1610)

Histriomastix or The Player Whipped is a late Elizabethan play, written by the satirist John Marston and acted in 1599. It was previously thought that the play was likely acted by the Children of Paul's, one of the companies of boy actors active at the time; but more recent research suggests that Histriomastix was performed at the 1598–9 Christmas revels of the Middle Temple. (Plays acted at the Inns of Court could take an approach opposite to that of the professionals, maximizing rather than minimizing the number of roles to make room for enthusiastic amateurs. Without doubling, a production of Histriomastix could accommodate as many as 120 performers. The play's rich texture of legal humor also suggests an Inns of Court performance.)

The play was entered into the Stationers' Register on 31 October 1610 and printed anonymously in the same year by George Eld for the publisher Thomas Thorpe. Marston's connection with the play is accepted unanimously, though scholars and critics have disputed the extent of Marston's authorship, some holding that Marston revised an older play that originated around 1589.

The play is a moral allegory about human nature that shows through a series of symbolic scenes how society is led into war and destruction through pride, greed, and sloth. Among other specific targets of satire (such as women), the play targets professional actors (as the subtitle indicates) — which is consistent with the view that it was acted by nonprofessionals. The earlier version of the play, if indeed it existed, may have been a work performed at one of the Universities or Inns of Court.

The play was the opening installment in the War of the Theatres of 1599–1601. Ben Jonson, Marston's rival in that controversy, is lampooned as the character Chrisoganus.
