= Masque at Ashby Castle =

1607 play by John Marston

The Masque at Ashby Castle or Entertainment at Ashby was written by John Marston for Henry Hastings, 5th Earl of Huntingdon and Elizabeth Hastings, Countess of Huntingdon performed at Ashby de la Zouch Castle for Alice Spencer, Countess of Derby in August 1607.

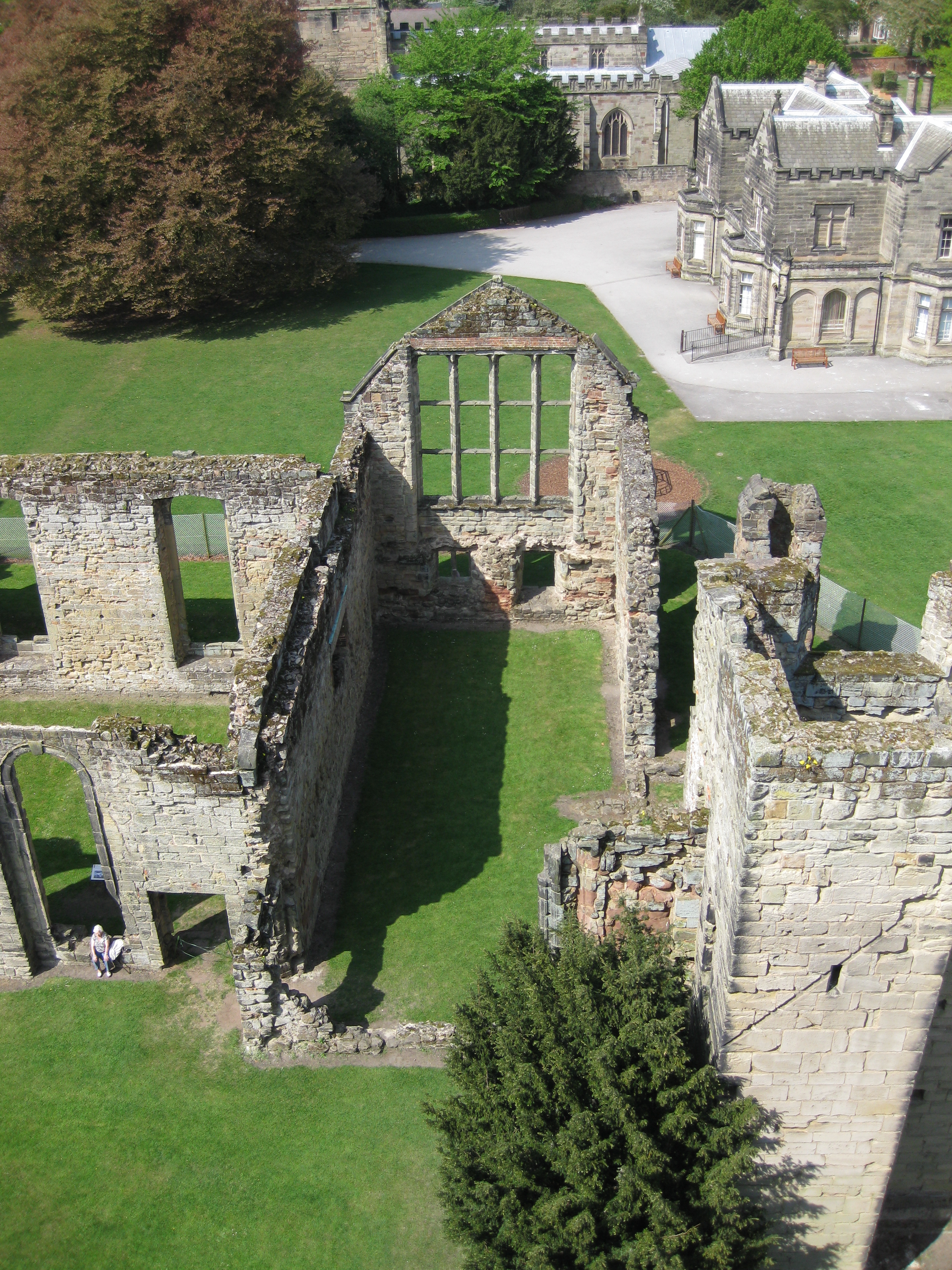
Cynthia and her chariot appeared in the Great Chamber of Ashby de la Zouch Castle

Elements of the masque and entertainment at Ashby can be related to Alice, Countess of Derby's own Harefield Entertainment for Elizabeth I in 1602. At Ashby the masque celebrated the alleged transformative powers of the patron's mother-in-law.

== Welcome ==
The entertainment consisted of a welcome for the Countess of Derby, followed by a masque. The castle was decorated with flags and the appearance of the gatehouse was enhanced. The countess was met at the gate by Merimna, an old enchantress dressed in crimson velvet, with a pale face and black hair, who declared she should not pass where Saturn, Lord of Sadness, held court. Saturn came out of the castle, and banished Mirimna, as the countess' "fair presence" forced him relent. The "all happy-making dame" was allowed to enter the castle.

As the party entered the castle the enchantress Merimna reappeared in white at top of the stairs, saying how she and her company had been transformed by the countess' eyes. She presented the Countess with an embroidered waistcoat.

== Masque ==
Next there was a masque of four knights and four gentlemen. Cynthia, the moon, riding in her chariot on a cloud was revealed in the Great Chamber, and there was a dialogue between her and Ariadne, who was seated on a cloud. The clouds moved up and down the height of great chamber, as Ariadne ascended to speak to Cynthia. After a song, a curtain was drawn to reveal the eight male masquers in a woodland setting. Their costumes resembled classical armour, like Roman Mercury.

There was a song, Audacious Night inviting the audience to dance.

Audacious night make bold the lip
Now all court chaster pleasure
Whilst to Apollo's harp you trip
And tread the gracious measure
Now meet, now break, then feign a warlike sally
So Cynthia sports, and so the gods may dally

During this song, the male masquers presented their shields, and took ladies from the audience to dance with them. The eight masquers at Hampton Court in The Masque of Indian and China Knights had similarly presented shields before inviting ladies to dance.

At some point in the festivities, verses by William Skipwith were addressed to, or recited by 14 women; Lady Derby; Lady Huntingdon; Lady Hunsdon; Elizabeth, Jane, Lady Berkeley; Margaret, Lady Stanhope; Lady Compton; Bridget, Lady Feilding; Mrs Gresley; Susanna, Mrs Gresley; Dorothy, Mrs Pakington; Mrs K. Fisher; Mrs Sacheverell; Mrs M. Fisher; Mrs Davers; Mrs Egerton. The verses are part of lottery, a gift giving ceremony, like that at Harefield in 1602.

As the Countess of Derby left Ashby, there was an eclogue between a nymph and shepherd, and Niobe met her in the park and gave her a cabinet.
