= Microcynicon: Six Snarling Satires =

16th-century satirical work

Microcynicon: Six Snarling Satires is a work of poetic satire written by English playwright Thomas Middleton in 1597 and 1598. The print version (STC 17154) was published in 1599 by Thomas Creede for Thomas Bushell and was burned publicly as part of the Archbishop of Canterbury's attack on verse satire; it was not reprinted again in the seventeenth century. Although a minor work, the poems included prefigure the interests of Middleton's mature work in sin, hypocrisy, and lust. The poem was influenced by works by John Marston and Joseph Hall, and has been described as one of Middleton's "masterpieces".
