= The Metamorphosis of Pigmalions Image =

Volume of poems by John Marston

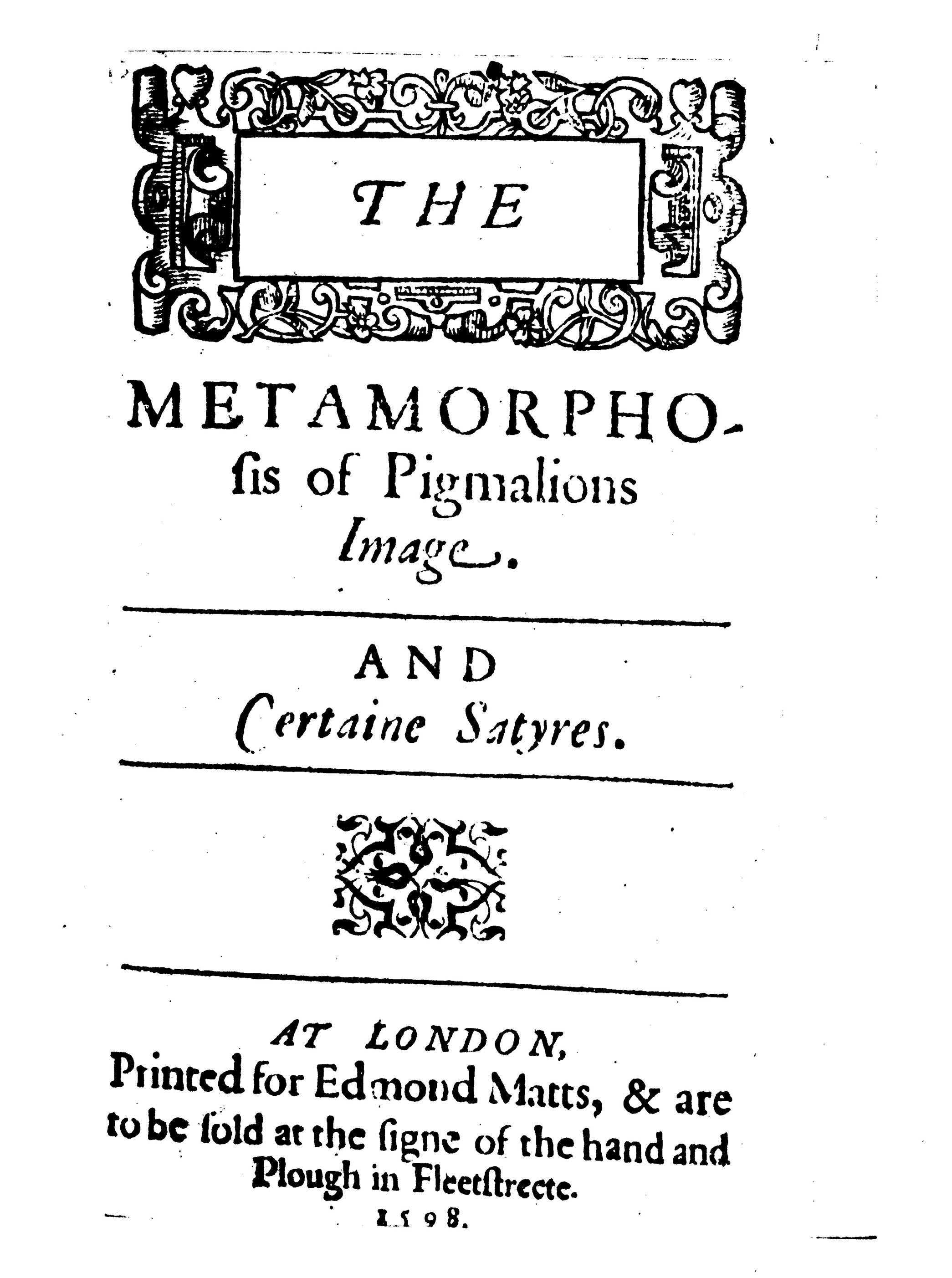
Title page of The Metamorphosis of Pigmalion's Image, 1598

The Metamorphosis of Pigmalions Image and Certaine Satyres is an octavo volume of poems by John Marston, printed in 1598.
