= William Barksted =

17th-century English actor and poet

William Barksted (fl. 1611) was an English actor and poet.

== Biography ==
William Barksted in 1609 performed in Ben Jonson's Epicene, and in 1613 in Beaumont and Fletcher's Coxcomb. When he performed in Epicene he was of the company "provided and kept" by Kirkham, Hawkins, Kendall, and Payne, and in Jonson's folio of 1616 he is associated with "Nat. Field, Gil. Carie, Hugh Attawel, Joh. Smith, Will Pen, Ric. Allen, and Joh. Blaney." This company of actors, in the reign of Elizabeth the "children of the chapel", under James I was the "children of the queen's revels"; but on the title-page of Hiren it is "his Maiesties", not the "queen's" revels, so that the designation may have varied. Certain documents (a bond and articles of agreement in connection with Philip Henslowe and Edward Alleyn) introduce Barksted's name in 1611 and 1615–16, as belonging to this company of actors referred.

Nothing later concerning him has been discovered, except an anecdote worked into the Wit and Mirth of John Taylor, the Water Poet, in 1629. In some copies also of the Insatiate Countess, dated 1631, the name of John Marston is displaced by that of William Barksted. It was possibly as actor that he became acquainted with Henry, earl of Oxford, and Elizabeth, countess of Derby. The former he calls, in the verse-dedication of Hiren, "the Heroicke Heroes". The Countess of Derby is addressed as "Your honor's from youth oblig'd".’

== Works ==
Barksted was the author of the poems Mirrha, the Mother of Adonis; or Lustes Prodegies (1607); and Hiren, or the Faire Greeke (1611). On the title-page of the latter, he describes himself as "one of the servants of his Maiesties Revels". There is a "Prologue to a playe to the cuntry people" in Ashmole MS. 38 (art. 198), which William Carew Hazlitt attributed to Barksted, that is signed "William Buckstead, Comedian". Such unhappily is the little personal fact that research has yielded.

Barksted has been identified by some with W. B., the author of a rough verse-translation of a "Satire of Juvenal", entitled That which seems Best is Worst, exprest in a paraphrastical transcript of Iuvenal's tenth Satyre. Together with the Tragicall Narration of Virginius's Death interserted, London, 1617. This is a paraphrase resembling in method Barksted's Mirrha, which is paraphrased from the tenth book of Ovid's Metamorphoses.

Both Mirrha and Hiren owe much to "Venus and Adonis", and their author pays the following tribute to Shakespeare at the close of Mirrha:—

But stay my Muse in thine owne confines keepe,
And wage not warre with so deere lou'd a neighbor,
But hauing sung thy day song, rest and sleepe,
Preserue thy small fame and his greater fauor:
His song was worthie merrit (Shakspeare hee)
Sung the faire blossome, thou the withered tree:
Lawrell is due to him, his art and wit
Hath purchas'd it, Cypres thy brow will fit.
