= Ashby de la Zouch Castle =

15th-century fortification in England

- Ashby-de-la-Zouch, Leicestershire, England
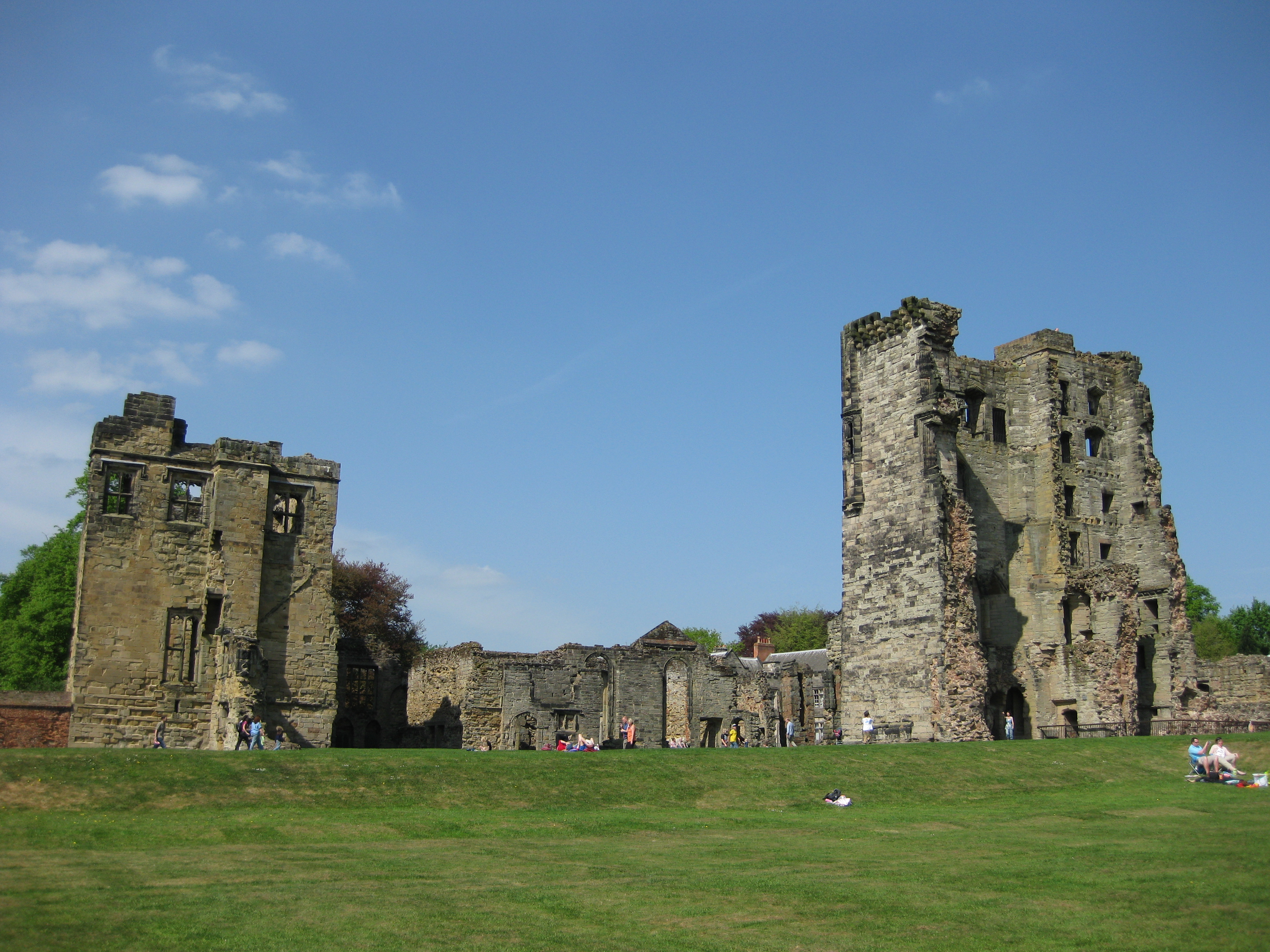
- The castle seen from the south-west, showing the Kitchen Tower (left) and the Great Tower (right)

Site information
- Controlled by: English Heritage
- Open to the public: Yes
- Condition: Ruined

Location
- Coordinates: 52°44′46″N 1°27′59″W

Site history
- Materials: Sandstone

Ashby de la Zouch Castle is a ruined fortification in the town of Ashby-de-la-Zouch, Leicestershire, England. The castle was built by William, Lord Hastings, a favourite of Edward IV, after 1473, accompanied by the creation of a 3,000-acre (1,200 ha) park. Constructed on the site of an older manor house, two large towers and various smaller buildings had been constructed by 1483, when Hastings was executed by Richard, Duke of Gloucester. The Hastings family used the castle as their seat for several generations, improving the gardens and hosting royal visitors.

During the English Civil War of the 1640s, Henry, a younger son in the Hastings family, became a Royalist commander in the Midlands. He based himself at the castle until he was forced to surrender it after a long siege. A fresh rebellion occurred in 1648, leading Parliament to slight the castle in order to prevent it being used militarily: the two towers were badly damaged with gunpowder and undermining. Parts of the remaining castle were turned into a new house and continued to be used by members of the Hastings family for many years, although they moved their main residence to Donington Hall.

The castle became famous after it featured in Sir Walter Scott's novel Ivanhoe in 1819, and its owner, Francis Rawdon, opened the ruins to visitors. Restoration work was carried out over the course of the next century, but by 1932 the Rawdon family could no longer afford to maintain the castle. It passed into the guardianship of the Ministry of Works, who carried out extensive repairs and opened the castle gardens. In the 21st century, the castle is managed by English Heritage as a tourist attraction, receiving 15,164 visitors in 2015. The historian John Goodall considers the site to be an "outstanding example of a late medieval castle", with its grounds forming "one of the best-preserved and most important" examples of an early Tudor garden.

== History ==
=== 11th–15th centuries ===
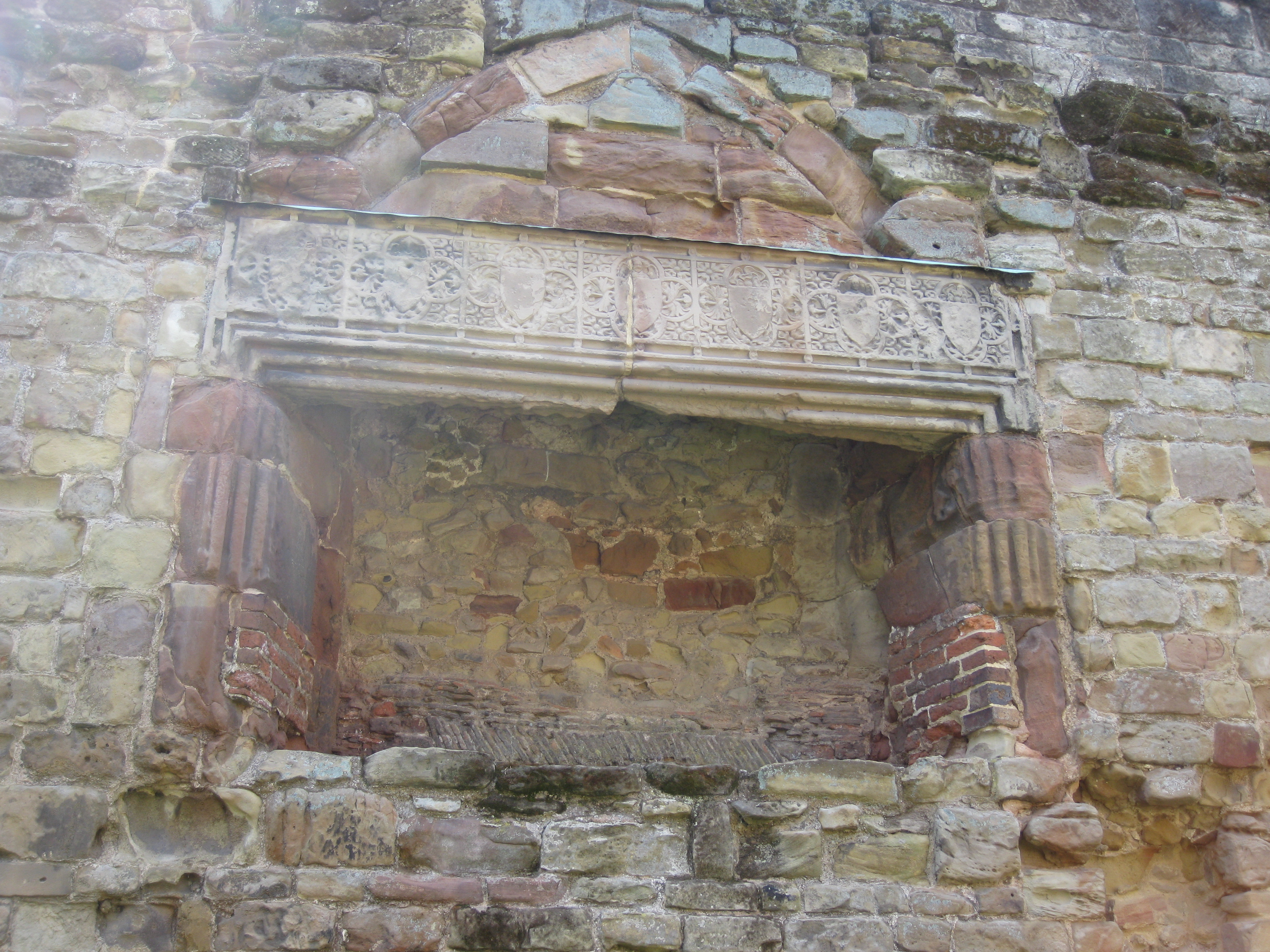
Carved fireplace in the Great Hall, decorated with images of angels and shields

A manor had existed at Ashby-de-la-Zouch from at least 1086, when the location was known as Ascebi. The lands were acquired by Robert de Beaumont, the Count of Meulan and later Earl of Leicester, in 1100. He established the Belmeis family there as his tenants and, after the Belmeis family line died out in 1160, the earls of Leicester reassigned the estate to the La Zouche family, from whom the manor took its later name.

At some point during this period, a manor house was constructed on the same site as the later castle, with a hall and a solar. A settlement grew up alongside the house and, by 1334, the town was probably the sixth-largest in the county. By the mid-1300s, the manor house reportedly included a hall, a chamber, a long house containing service facilities, and was surrounded by a dovecote, orchard and a rabbit warren, accompanied by a 60-acre (24 ha) deer park. The hall and solar were rebuilt by the le Zouches during the second half of the 14th century, but the building remained what the historian Norman Pounds has called a "rather modest manor house".

The le Zouch line died out in 1399, leaving the inheritance of the family estates uncertain. The manor probably passed to Sir Hugh Burnell, which was married to one of the co-heiresses. He arranged its sale to Joan Beauchamp, Baroness Bergavenny, who from around 1420 increasingly lived there in preference to her previous residence at Harvington in Worcestershire. Joan's daughter married James Butler, 4th Earl of Ormond, and through this connection must have passed into possession of James Butler, the Earl of Ormond and Wiltshire. The Wars of the Roses broke out in England during 1455 between the rival supporters of the Lancastrian and Yorkist factions. James, a Lancastrian, was captured at the Battle of Towton by the Yorkist leader Edward IV in 1461 and executed; the Crown seized his estates, including the manor of Ashby de la Zouch.

Ashby de la Zouch was converted into a castle by William, Lord Hastings, a favourite of Edward IV; as a minor nobleman he had fought alongside Edward at Towton, but was then knighted and later became the chamberlain of the royal household and the Lieutenant of Calais. William acquired extensive estates across the Midlands during the wars, much of them confiscated from his enemies. Amongst these was Ashby de la Zouch, which was given to William in 1462. His father, Sir Leonard, had maintained the family seat at nearby Kirby Muxloe, but after 1471 William began to use Ashby de la Zouch as his primary residence.

In 1474, Edward granted William the right to crenellate, or fortify, four of his manors and to build deer parks around them. William set about developing the old manorial complex at Ashby de la Zouch with new buildings, and was authorised to create a huge 3,000-acre (1,200 ha) park around it. His intent appears to have been to construct a substantial castle, similar to the royal fortifications at Tutbury and Nottingham, with four huge towers. Work appears to have already started on the site the year before permission was formally given, although it is uncertain whether this referred to the construction of the castle's chapel, or if William had already begun work on the first tower, gambling that the King would subsequently approve it.

Edward IV died in 1483, leaving the kingdom to his young son, Edward V, but his uncle, Richard, Duke of Gloucester, had his own ambitions for the throne. Lord Hastings was unwilling to support the deposition of Edward V and, as a consequence, Richard summarily executed him that June, ahead of his own coronation. Ashby de la Zouch Castle, only partially completed, and Lord Hastings' other estates were then restored to his widow, Katherine.

=== 16th–17th centuries ===
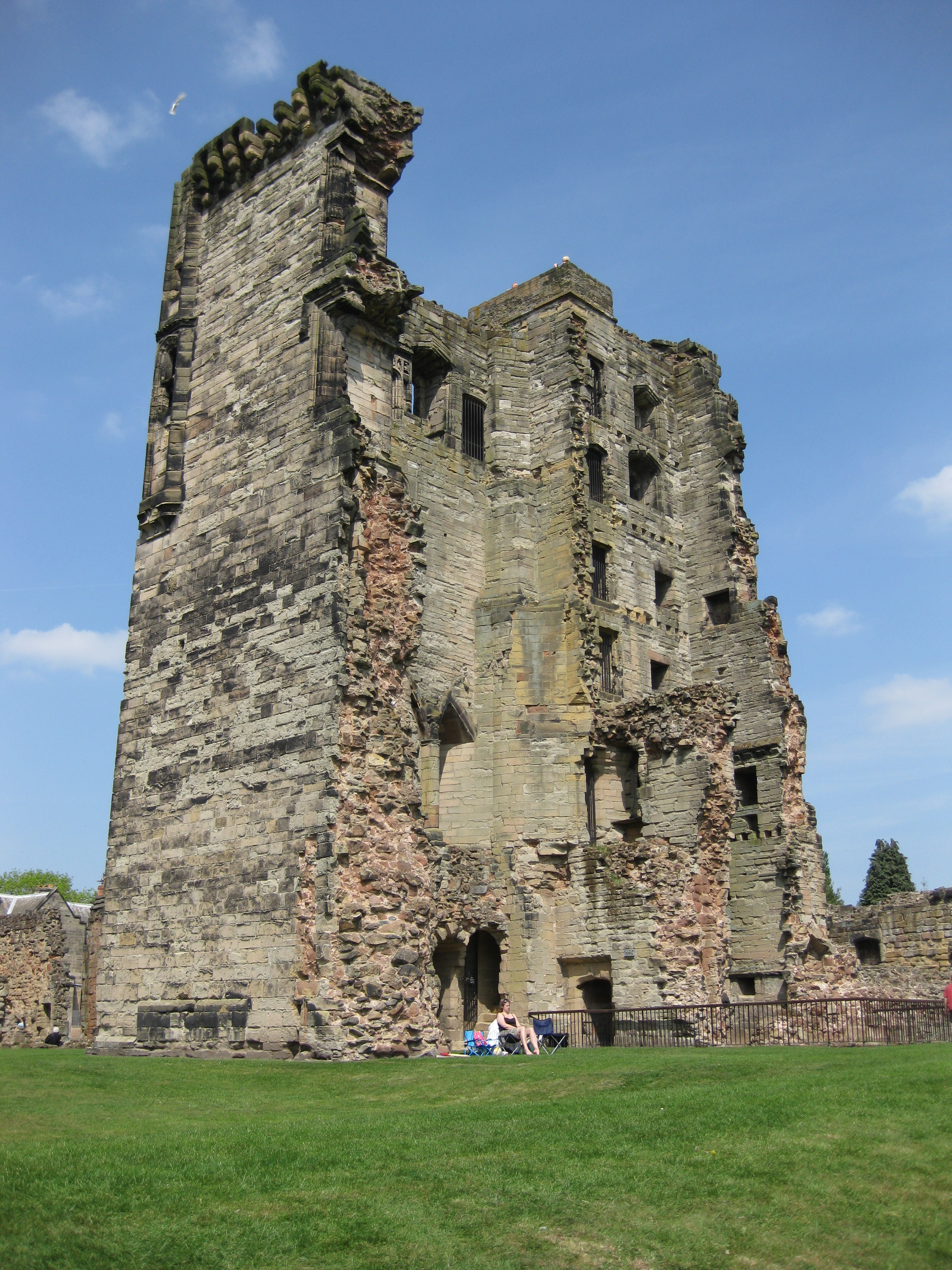
The Great Tower, slighted after the English Civil War

The castle passed to William's son, Edward Hastings, who appears to have spent little time at the property, although he hosted a visit from Henry VIII in 1503. It was then inherited by his son, George, who was a royal favourite of Henry VIII and made the Earl of Huntington in 1529, which led to him rebuilding parts of the castle in brick and redesigning the gardens. Henry Hastings inherited the castle in 1560, where he maintained a household of 77 servants. Henry Hastings used it to imprison Mary Queen of Scots in 1569 after she was accused of plotting against Elizabeth I, although he spent most of his time at York, where he led the Council of the North.

It passed onto his younger brother, George, who entertained Queen Anne, Princess Elizabeth, and Prince Henry there on 22 June 1603. The Countess of Derby was welcomed in August 1607 with the Masque at Ashby Castle. His grandson, Henry hosted James I three times between 1612 and 1617, and Charles I in 1634. The gardens were redeveloped, probably to provide a suitable venue for these royal visits. By now, however, several generations of excessive expenditure meant that the family estates had been much diminished, and the family was having trouble maintaining their lavish lifestyle and former prominence in the region.

In 1642, the English Civil War broke out between the supporters of Charles I and Parliament. Henry Hasting briefly joined the royalist cause before his death in 1643, but his eldest son Ferdinando, who inherited the family earldom, remained neutral during the conflict. Ferdinando's younger brother Henry, however, became a key Royalist commander in the Midlands. The castle was strategically well-placed, linking the Royalist territories in the north and the west of England, and giving easy access to the River Trent. Henry used the castle as his base of operations across the region, protecting it by establishing smaller outposts near Donnington and Shardlow. Buildings in the town of Ashby de la Zouch were pulled down to provide materiel to refortify the castle and town, tunnels were dug and an "Irish fort" constructed to help protect the castle. (Note: It is unclear from the evidence what the "Irish fort" was, or exactly where it was constructed.)

In early 1643, Parliament placed Newark under siege, and the garrison at Ashby was sent to relieve it. As part of a larger force under Prince Rupert, they forced the surrender of the Parliamentary force. By late 1644, the war turned against the King, and the Parliamentary forces based at nearby Coleorton had contained the garrison in the castle. King Charles passed through the castle in May 1645 on his way to besiege Leicester, but the following month his forces were defeated at the Battle of Naseby; the King briefly stayed at the castle once again as he retreated west. By now, the Royalist cause was largely lost.

Henry returned to the castle from Leicester in September, where another 600 Royalist soldiers soon joined him and its 60-man garrison, carrying out raids on Parliamentary convoys and the garrison at Coleorton. Plague broke out at the end of the year, forcing the besiegers to retreat to Leicester, while the garrison temporarily abandoned the castle buildings and occupied the neighbouring park. Once the epidemic passed, Parliament began to raid the town and Henry worked through Ferdinando to agree the surrender of the castle on good terms: this was achieved in February 1646, and allowed for the release of himself, the garrison and their weapons.

In May 1648, a Royalist rebellion broke out in Kent. There were fresh Parliamentary concerns about Henry Hastings and fears grew that he might reoccupy Ashby de la Zouch Castle. Lord Grey – a rival of the Hastings family in Leicestershire – was put in charge of the castle in August, which was used to hold Royalist prisoners, including James Hamilton, the Duke of Hamilton. Parliamentary worries about the security of the castle persisted and, possibly because of Henry's involvement in the recent rebellion, William Bainbrigg was ordered in November to slight the castle to put it beyond military use. He carried out his orders immediately, demolishing one side of the Great Tower and the Kitchen Tower, undermining the foundations and deploying gunpowder charges.

The Hastings family suffered financially as a result of the war, and Ferdinando was imprisoned for debt in 1653. The family moved to Donington Hall, although some of the remains of the castle were repaired to form a house called Ashby Place, which lay on the north side of the site in the old outer court. Selina Hastings, the Countess of Huntingdon, lived there after 1746. With the deterioration of the castle and the departure of the Hastings, the neighbouring town also fell into decline. With the death of Francis Hastings in 1789, the castle was inherited by Francis Rawdon, who later became the Earl of Moira.

=== 18th–21st centuries ===
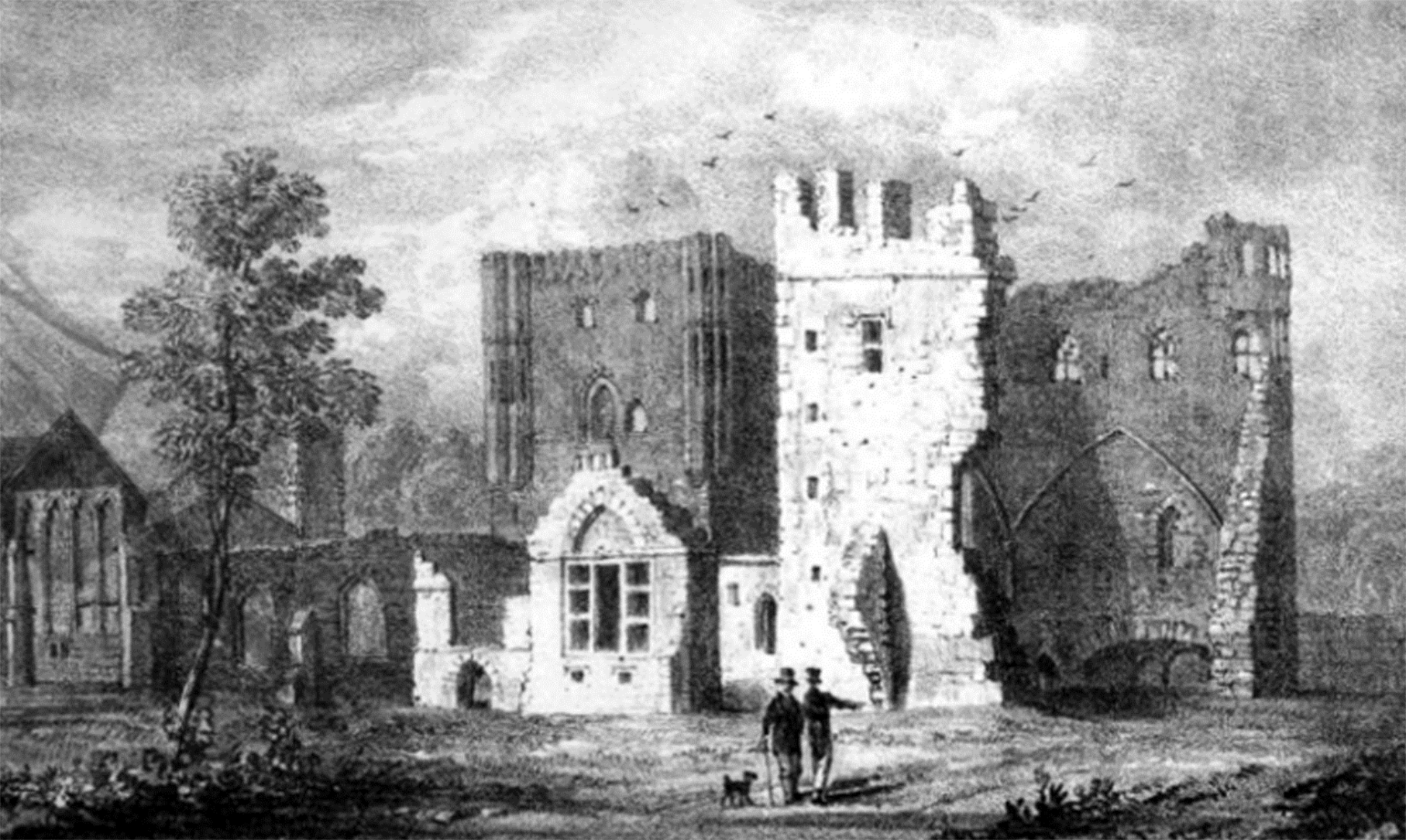
Engraving of the castle in 1831

In 1819, Sir Walter Scott's novel Ivanhoe featured a scene involving a tournament at Ashby de la Zouch Castle; the novel was immensely popular and made the location famous. Edward Mammatt, Francis Rawdon's agent, repaired the castle ruins and opened them to visitors, whom Rawdon hoped to attract to the Ivanhoe Baths which he opened nearby. Ashby Place, which had become used as a House of Industry, was pulled down in 1830 and a new house, Ashby Manor, was built in its place. Work continued throughout the 19th century to repair the castle ruins, although they remained mostly covered in ivy.

A local architect, Thomas Fosbrooke, carried out the first archaeological investigation of the site in 1900, and extensive restoration work took place the following years. The Rawdon family were given a government grant for further repairs in 1912 and they began to start charging visitors for entry. The family found themselves unable to afford to maintain the castle, and by the early 1930s the walls had become unstable and dangerous. The castle was placed into the guardianship of the Ministry of Works in 1932, who carried out repairs, replacing some stonework and opening up the surrounding grounds to visitors.

In the 21st century, the castle is managed by English Heritage as a tourist attraction, receiving 15,164 visitors in 2015. An archaeological investigation of the castle gardens was carried out in 2006. The site is protected under UK law as a Grade I listed building and a scheduled monument.

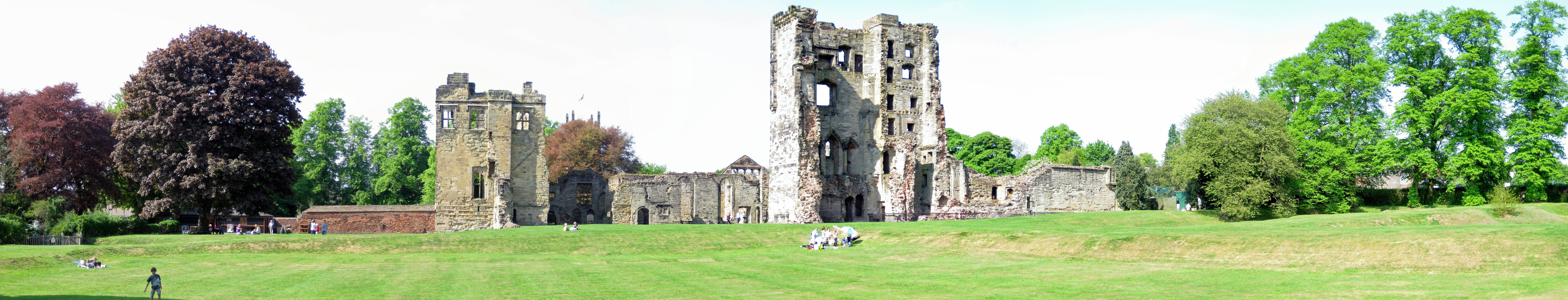
The castle and the sunken gardens

== Architecture and landscape ==
=== Architecture ===
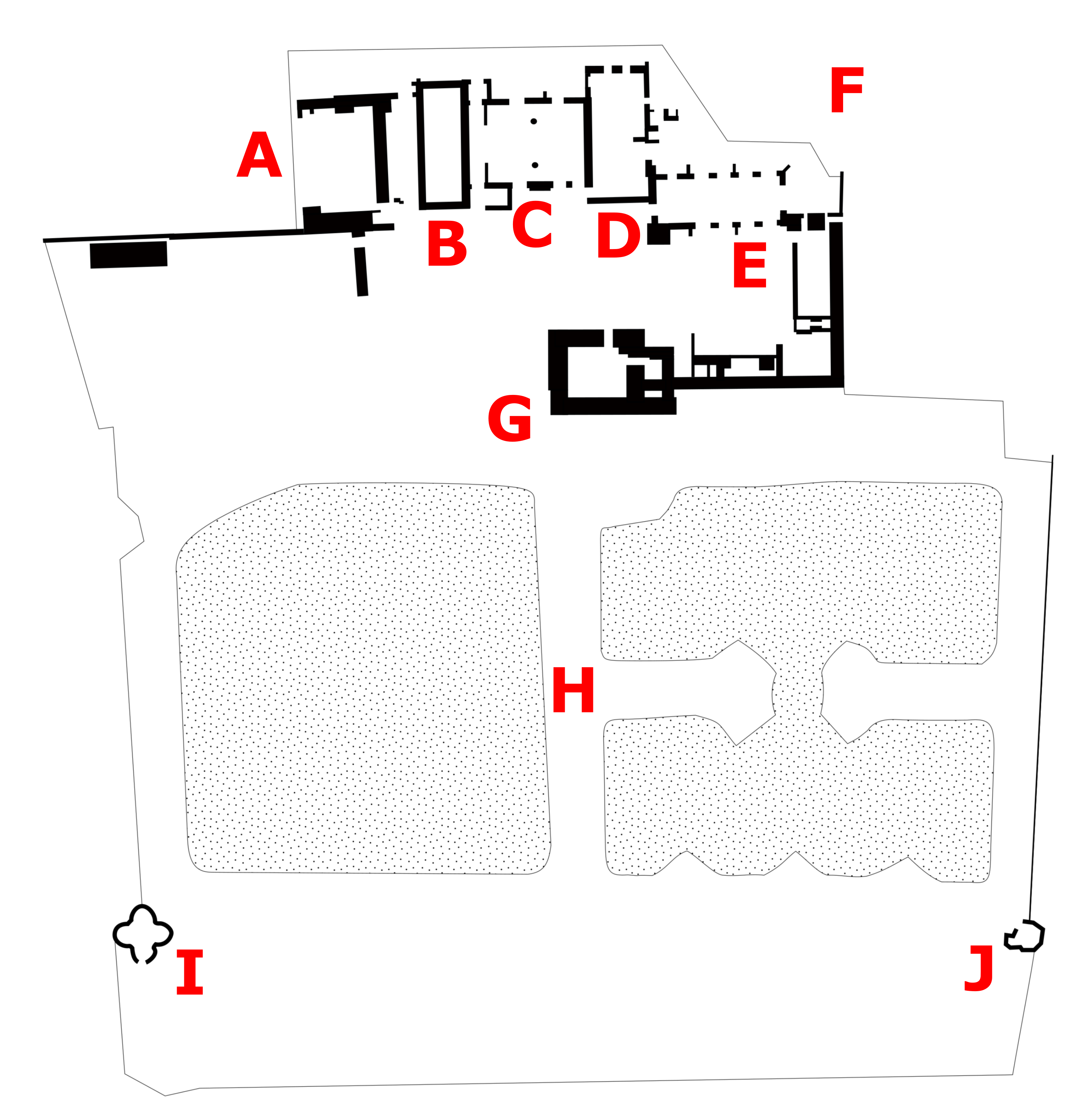
Map of the castle: A – Kitchen Tower; B – buttery and pantry; C – Great Hall; D – Great Chamber; E – chapel and inner court; F – site of northern court; G – Great Tower; H – sunken gardens; I – south-west garden tower; J – south-east garden tower

The ruins of Ashby de la Zouch Castle are located close to the centre of the modern town, and comprise two large towers and associated buildings arranged around a court, with formal gardens to the south. Lord Hastings probably intended his castle to ultimately have four large towers, enclosing the interior buildings with a curtain wall to a regular design, but only half of these towers were completed by the time of his death. The outer court that lay to the north of the surviving complex has been lost; having been converted into first Ashby Place, and then Ashby Manor, it is now occupied by the Manor House Preparatory School. The historian John Goodall considers Ashby de la Zouch to form an "outstanding example of a late medieval castle".

The Kitchen Tower stands on the north-west corner of the castle and was intended to supply Lord Hasting's large household. The tower only had two storeys, as the ground floor kitchen had a very high, 34 feet (10 m) high vaulted ceiling, and its walls were 9 feet (2.7 m) thick and made of yellow sandstone. The well-lit kitchen had several hearths and an oven for cooking, a well and a cellar for storage. Above the kitchen was a large room, probably used as a winter parlour. One wall of the tower was slighted in 1648. An underground passage, probably dating from the English Civil War, links the Great Tower with the Kitchen Tower.

Alongside the tower, separated for fire safety by a roofed passageway, was a two-storey service range, including a buttery and pantry. The castle's Great Hall was adapted from the medieval original, and would originally have been subdivided by a line of arches. It was heated by a central heath and the lord and his guests would have eaten on a raised dais at the far end of the hall. The building was raised in height, given new windows and reroofed in the second half of the 17th century. The Great Chamber was a two-storey building, originally with a parlour on the ground level, with a chamber above it used for entertaining guests. Running north from the Great Chamber was a range of buildings used by the senior household staff.

The large chapel, 60 by 21 feet (18.3 by 6.4 m) and built of grey sandstone, lies alongside the Great Chamber, and would originally had an altar on a dais at the north end. One corner of the chapel remains in use as a burial site by the modern Hastings family. An inner, or chapel, court would have been formed by a range of buildings, since lost, stretching between the chapel and the Great Tower. The historian Anthony Emery notes that the castle would have formed a "palace fortress", with the sizeable chapel and adjacent towers constituting symbols of Hastings' power and authority.

The Great Tower was a large structure of grey sandstone, 75 feet (23 m) tall, formed of a four-storey tower, 30 by 25 feet (9.1 by 7.6 m) internally, linked to a smaller seven-storey tower or turret, 10 by 9 feet (3.0 by 2.7 m) across. The ground floor contained the basement and the entrance-way, protected by a portcullis. The first floor held the kitchen, and had a fire-proof stone-vaulted roof. The upper floors consisted of a parlour and a separate great chamber for the lord, with a withdrawing chamber to one side, all with grander windows than the lower levels, with excellent views of the gardens and the parkland beyond. A treasure chamber, accessible only from the upper storeys using a ladder, was built into the first floor. Emery considers the "richness of the upper rooms and the tower's planning and design qualities" to be outstanding, and likens it to the Yellow Tower of Gwent at Raglan Castle.

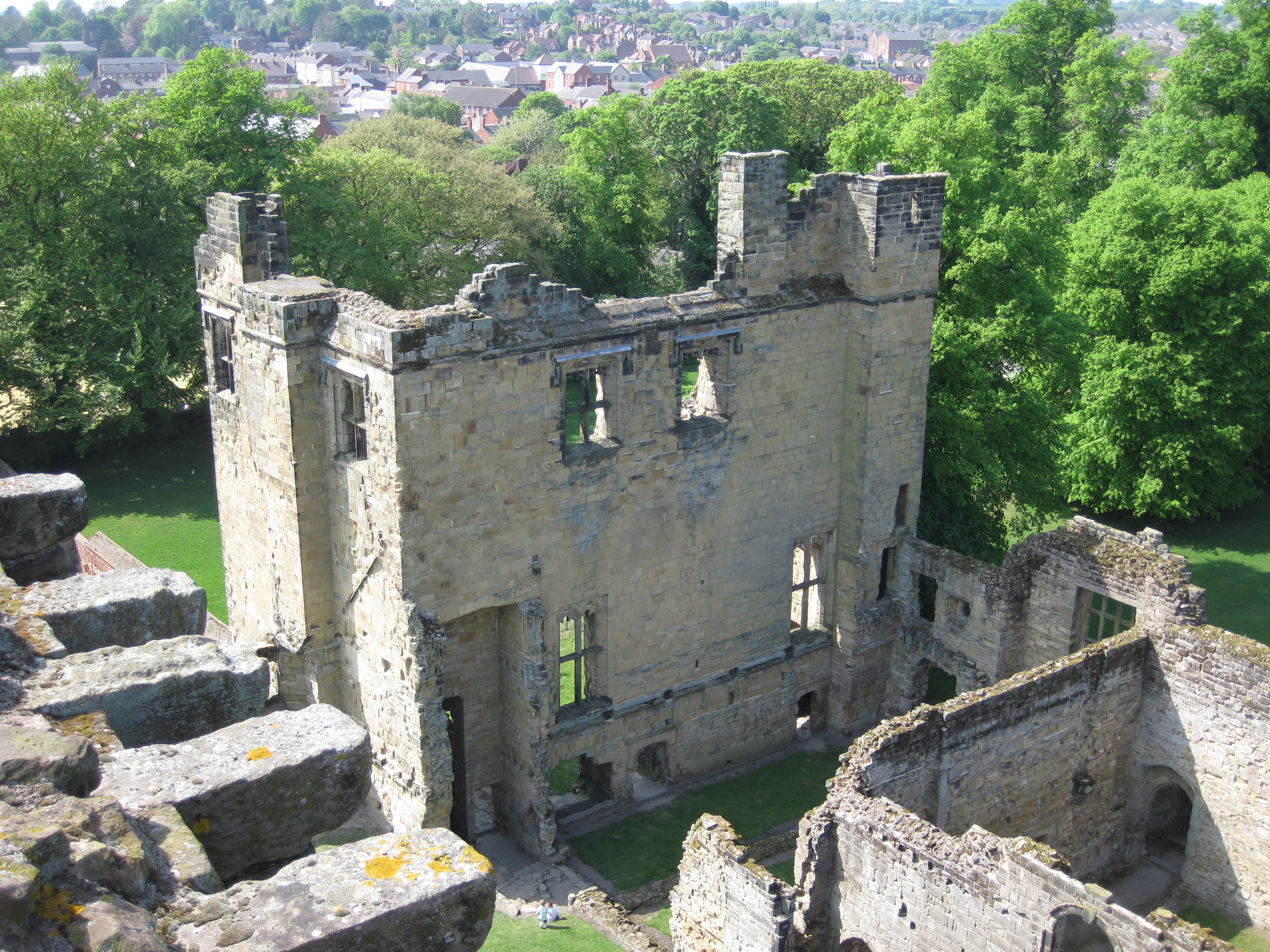
The Kitchen Tower

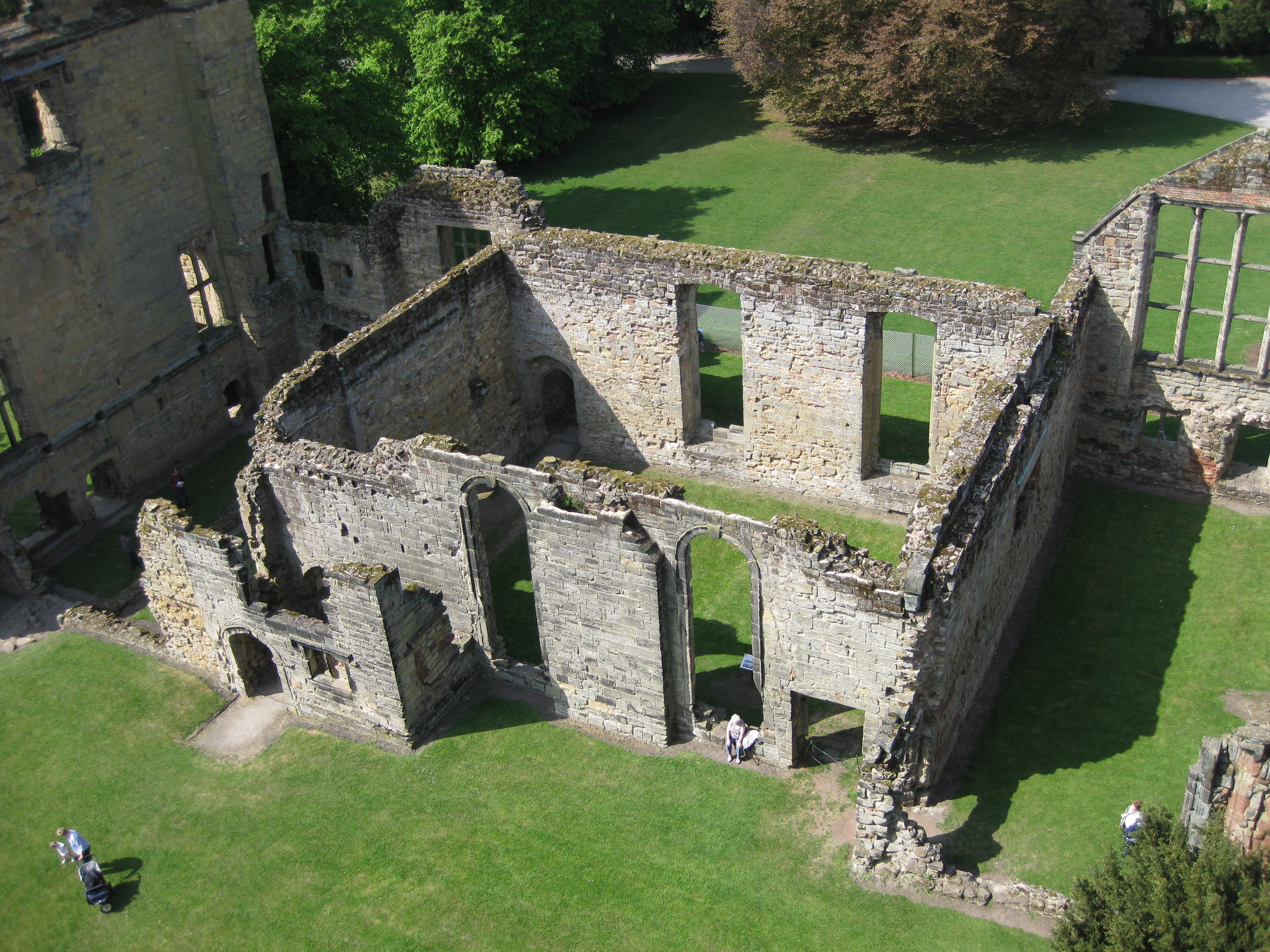
Great Hall

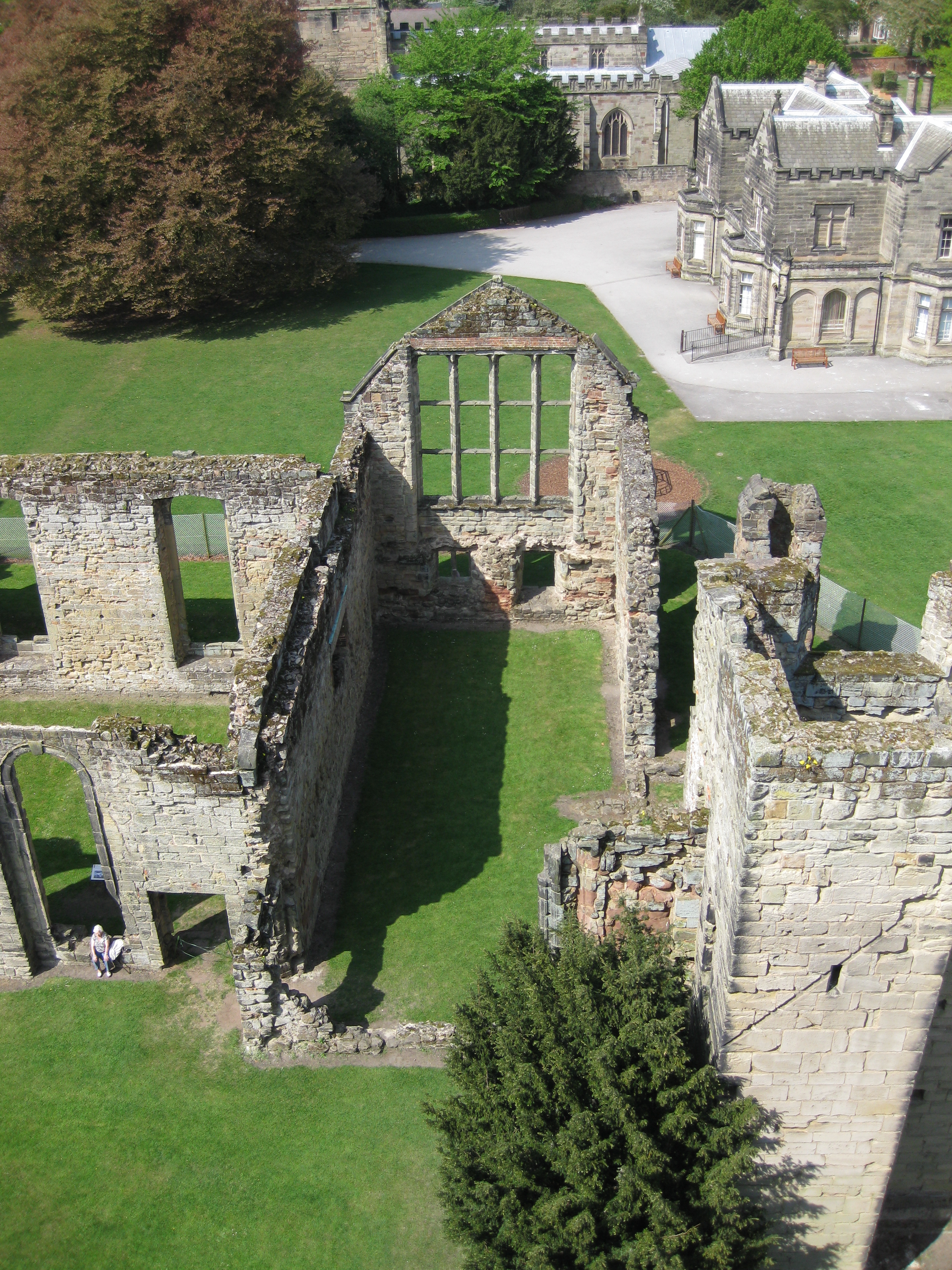
Great Chamber

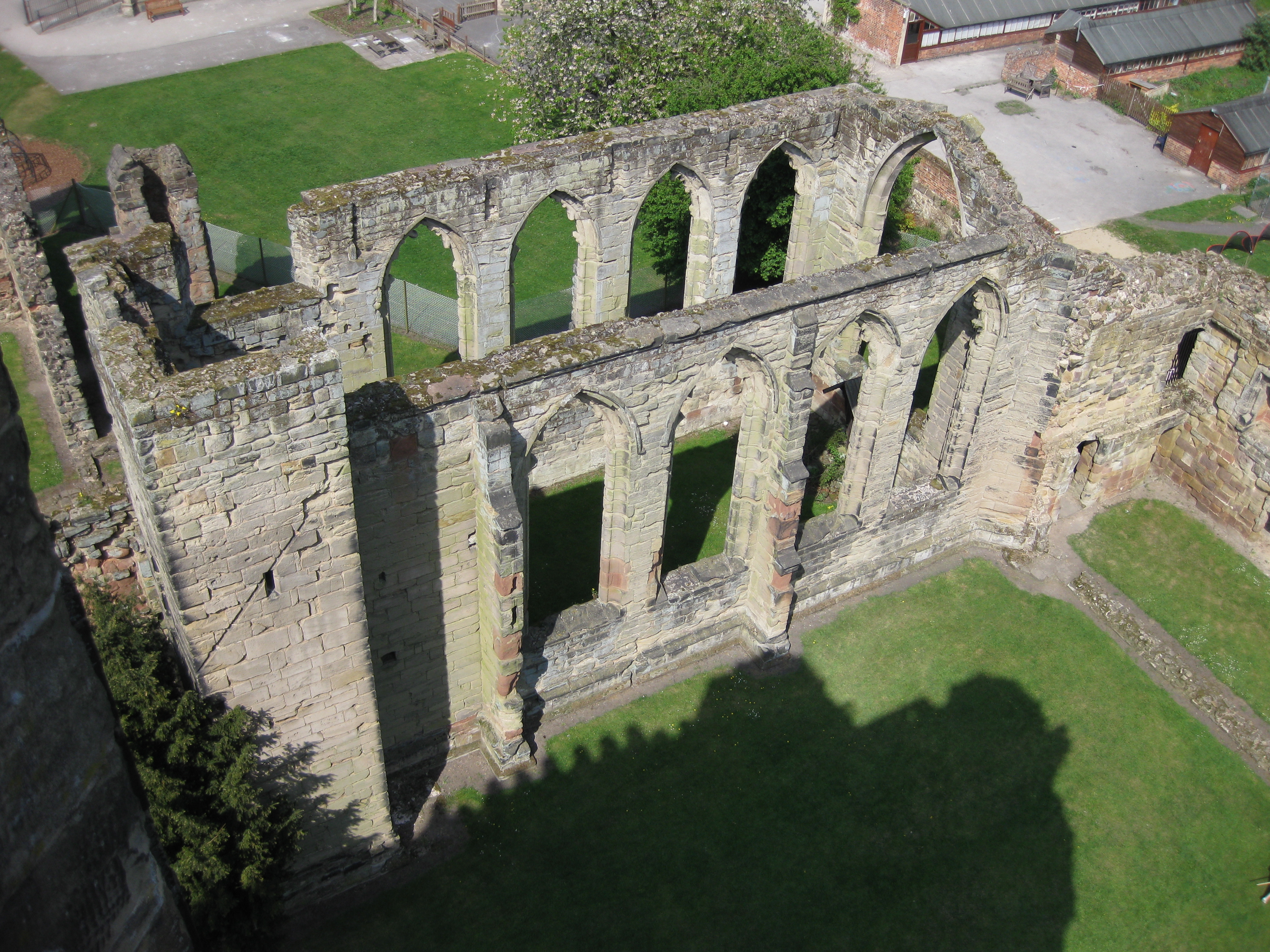
and chapel, as seen from the top of the Great Tower

=== Gardens and parkland ===
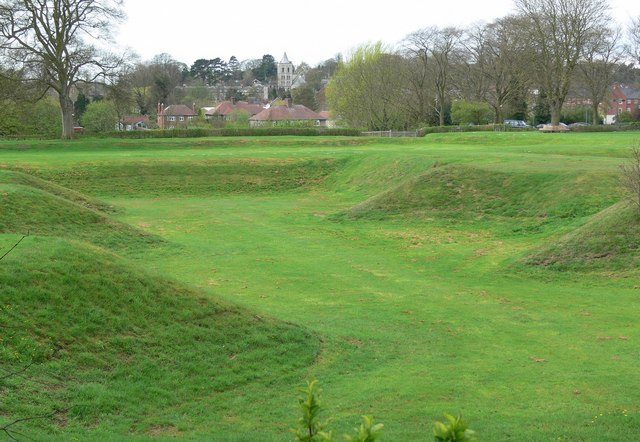
Earthworks in the eastern part of the garden, probably intended to resemble bastions

The current gardens to the south of the castle date from around 1530; they occupy 2.0 acres (0.8 ha), and include two sunken areas, separated by a walkway. The eastern area may have been intended to imitate defensive bastion works, and it originally featured a circular brick tower in the middle of it. The site would originally have had a brick wall running all the way around it, of which only the south-east edge survives. Two brick towers survive at the southern corners, one resembling a clover-leaf, the other with an octagonal design, and would have originally been used as banqueting houses. Beyond the gardens would have been an area planted with trees, called "the wilderness", and smaller compartmented garden and ponds. A triangular building called "the Mount" was built in the wilderness in the early 17th century, and is now a private house. John Goodall considers them to be "one of the best-preserved and most important early Tudor gardens in England".

The original 60 acres (24 ha) park probably lay just to the south of the castle, incorporating the current gardens; it was probably expanded to around 340 acres (140 ha) by William Hastings, and was later named the "Little Park". The original boundaries of the other two parks associated with castle to the north and west, Great Park and Prestop Park, are uncertain.

== See also ==
- Castles in Great Britain and Ireland
- List of castles in Leicestershire

== Bibliography ==
- Ashby-de-la-Zouch (1831). A Descriptive and Historical Guide to Ashby-de-la-Zouch and the Neighbourhood. Ashby de la Zouch, UK: T. Wayte. OCLC 557025588.
- Bennett, M. (1980). "Henry Hastings and the Flying Army of Ashby-de-la-Zouch". Transactions of the Leicestershire Archaeological and Historical Society. 56: 62–70.
- Creighton, Oliver H. (2013) [2009]. Designs Upon the Land: Elite Landscapes of the Middle Ages. Cambridge, UK: Woodbridge Press. ISBN 978-1-84383-825-8.
- Emery, Anthony (2000). Greater Medieval Houses of England and Wales, 1300–1500, Volume 2: East Anglia, Central England and Wales. Cambridge, UK: Cambridge University Press. ISBN 978-0-521-58131-8.
- Fry, Sebastian (2014). "A History of the National Heritage Collection: Volume Five: 1931–1945". Research Report Series. London, UK: English Heritage. ISSN 2046-9799.
- Goodall, John (2011). Ashby de la Zouch Castle and Kirby Muxloe Castle (2nd ed.). London, UK: English Heritage. ISBN 978-1-84802-109-9.
- Moxon, Chris (2013). Ashby-de-la-Zouch: Seventeenth Century Life in a Small Market Town. Farnworth, UK: Chris Moxon. ISBN 978-1-291-51228-1.
- Newsome, Sarah; Canti, Matt; Leary, Jim; Martin, Louise; Pattison, Paul (2008). "Ashby de la Zouch Castle, Leicestershire: A Multidisciplinary Investigation of the Castle Garden". Research Department Report Series. London, UK: English Heritage. ISSN 1749-8775.
- Pounds, Norman John Greville (1990). The Medieval Castle in England and Wales: A Social and Political History. Cambridge, UK: Cambridge University Press. ISBN 978-0-521-45828-3.
- Thompson, M. W. (1994) [1987]. The Decline of the Castle. Leicester, UK: Magna Books. ISBN 1-85422-608-8.
