= John Marston (playwright) =

English poet, playwright, and satirist (1576-1634)

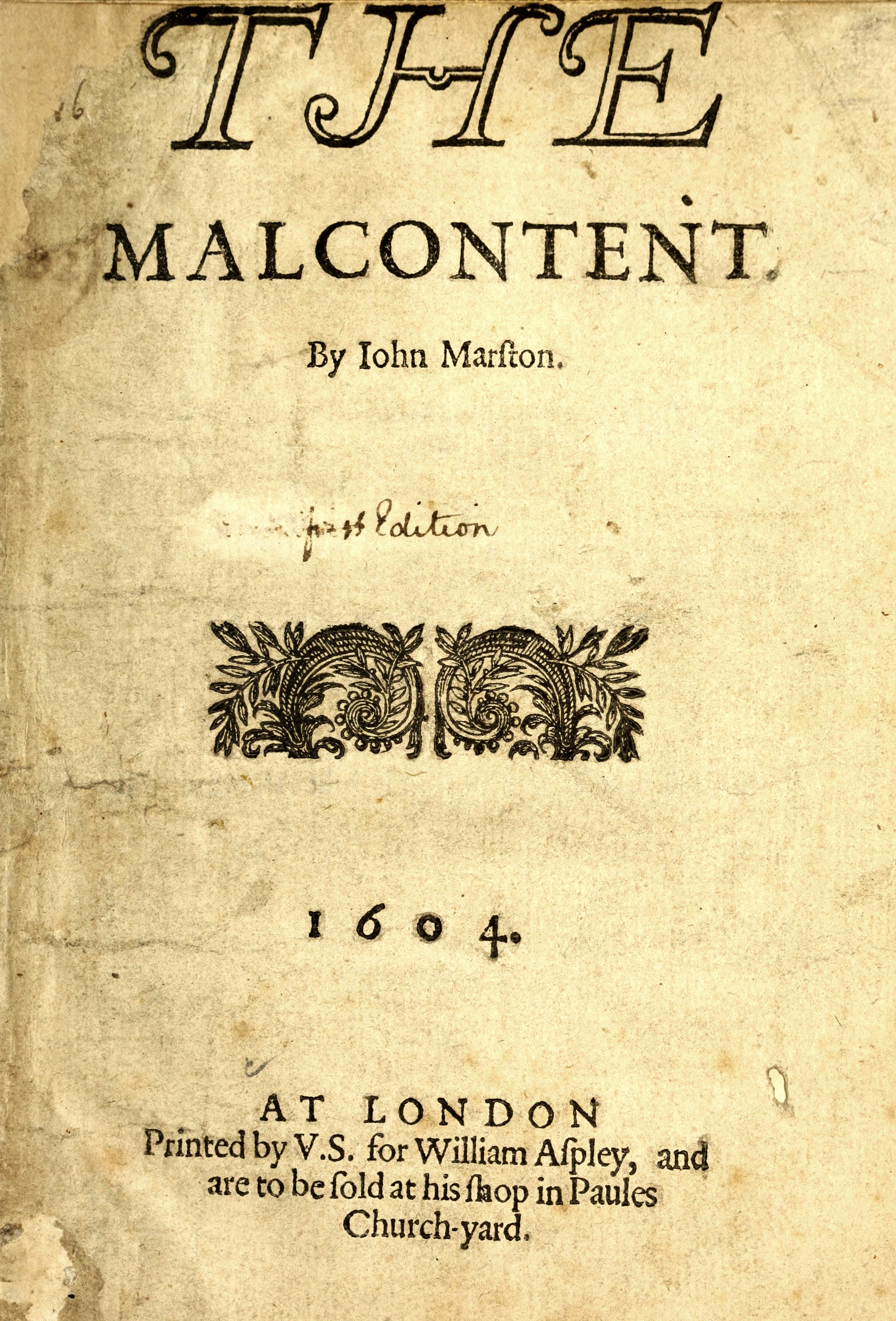
Title page of 1604 printing of The Malcontent, Marston’s most well-known play

John Marston (baptised 7 October 1576 – 25 June 1634) was an English playwright, poet and satirist during the late Elizabethan and early Jacobean periods. His career as a writer lasted only a decade. His work is remembered for its energetic and often obscure style, its contributions to the development of a distinctively Jacobean style in poetry, and its idiosyncratic vocabulary.

== Life ==
Marston was born to John and Maria Marston née Guarsi, and baptised 7 October 1576, at Wardington, Oxfordshire. His father was an eminent lawyer of the Middle Temple who first argued in London and then became the counsel to Coventry and ultimately its steward. John Marston entered Brasenose College, Oxford, in 1592 and received his BA in 1594. By 1595, he was in London, living in the Middle Temple, where he had been admitted a member three years previously. He had an interest in poetry and play writing, although his father's will of 1599 expresses the hope that he would give up such vanities. He married Mary Wilkes in 1605, daughter of the Reverend William Wilkes, one of King James's chaplains.

=== Early career ===
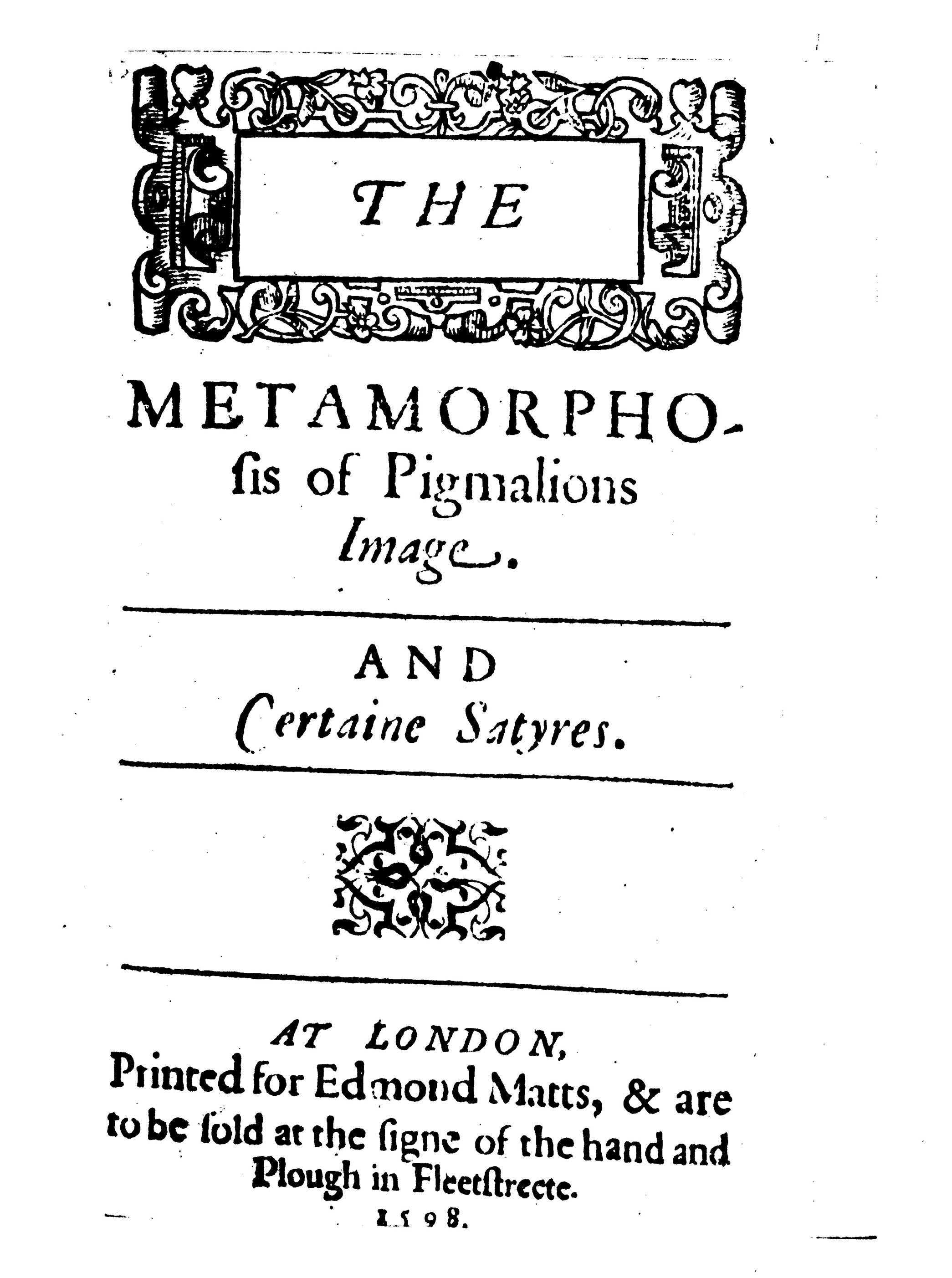
Title page of 1598 printing of Marston’s The Metamorphosis of Pigmalions Image

Marston's brief career in literature began with a foray into the then-fashionable genres of erotic epyllion and satire. In 1598, he published The Metamorphosis of Pigmalion's Image and Certaine Satyres, a book of poetry in imitation of, on the one hand, Ovid, and, on the other, the Satires of Juvenal. He also published another book of satires, The Scourge of Villanie, in 1598. (Marston issued these satires under the pseudonym "W. Kinsayder.") The satire in these books is even more savage and misanthropic than was typical for the decade's satirists. Marston's style is, moreover, in places contorted to the point of unintelligibility: he believed that satire should be rough and obscure, perhaps because he thought (as did many other writers of the time) that the term 'satire' was derived from the Greek 'satyr plays'. Marston seems to have been enraged by Joseph Hall's claim to be the first satirist in English; Hall comes in for some indirect flyting in at least one of the satires. Some see William Shakespeare's Thersites and Iago, as well as the mad speeches of King Lear as influenced by The Scourge of Villanie. Marston had, however, arrived on the literary scene as the fad for verse satire was to be checked by censors. The Archbishop of Canterbury John Whitgift and the Bishop of London Richard Bancroft banned the Scourge and had it publicly burned, along with copies of works by other satirists, on 4 June 1599.

=== Playwriting with Henslowe ===
In September 1599, John Marston began to work for Philip Henslowe as a playwright. Following the work of O. J. Campbell, it has commonly been thought that Marston turned to the theatre in response to the Bishops' Ban of 1599; more recent scholars have noted that the ban was not enforced with great rigour and might not have intimidated prospective satirists at all. At any rate, Marston proved a good match for the stage—not the public stage of Henslowe, but the "private" playhouses where boy players performed racy dramas for an audience of city gallants and young members of the Inns of Court. Traditionally, though without strong external attribution, Histriomastix has been regarded as his first play; performed by either the Children of Paul's or the students of the Middle Temple in around 1599, it appears to have sparked the War of the Theatres, the literary feud between Marston, Jonson and Dekker that took place between around 1599 and 1602. In c. 1600, Marston wrote Jack Drum's Entertainment and Antonio and Mellida, and in 1601 he wrote Antonio's Revenge, a sequel to the latter play; all three were performed by the company at Paul's. In 1601, he contributed poems to Robert Chester's Love's Martyr. For Henslowe, he may have collaborated with Dekker, Day, and Haughton on Lust's Dominion.

=== Feud with Jonson ===
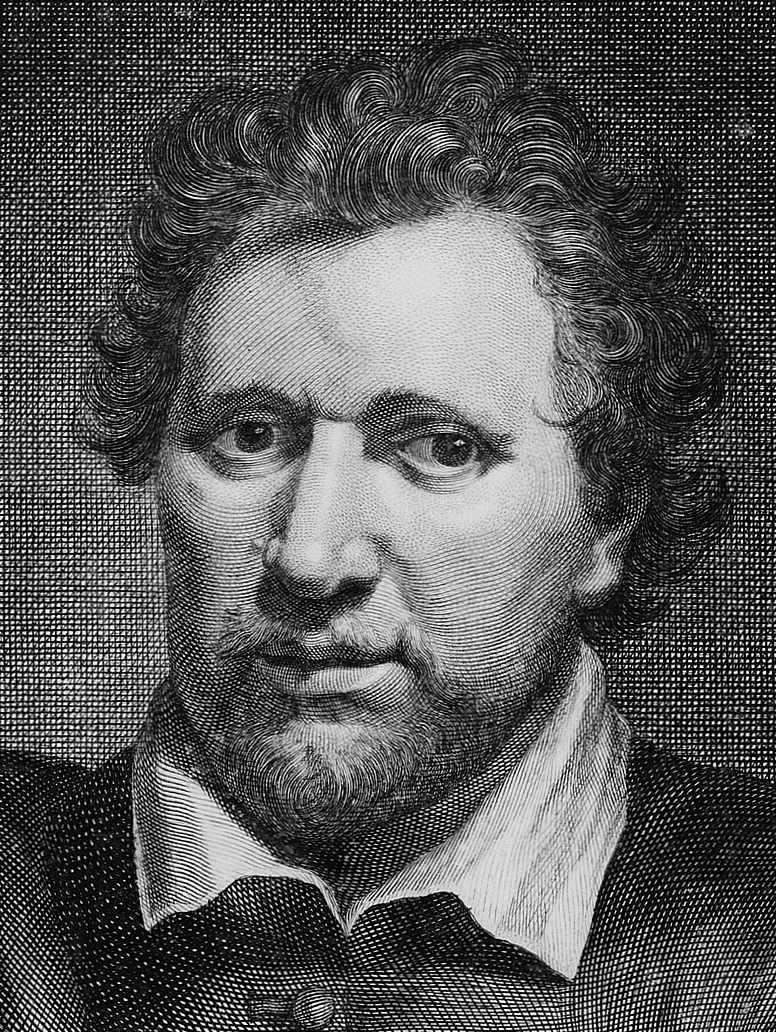
Ben Jonson: rival, co-author, frenemy

By 1601, he was well known in London literary circles, particularly in his role as enemy to the equally pugnacious Ben Jonson. Jonson, who reported to Drummond that Marston had accused him of sexual profligacy, satirised Marston as Clove in Every Man Out of His Humour, as Crispinus in Poetaster, and as Hedon in Cynthia's Revels. Jonson criticised Marston for being a false poet, a vain, careless writer who plagiarised the works of others and whose own works were marked by bizarre diction and ugly neologisms. For his part, Marston may have satirised Jonson as the complacent, arrogant critic Brabant Senior in Jack Drum's Entertainment and as the envious, misanthropic playwright and satirist Lampatho Doria in What You Will.

The Return from Parnassus (II), a satirical play performed at St. John's College, Cambridge in 1601 and 1602, characterised Marston as a poet whose writings see him "pissing against the world".

If Jonson can be trusted, the animosity between himself and Marston went beyond the literary. He claimed to have beaten Marston and taken his pistol. However, the two playwrights were reconciled soon after the so-called War; Marston wrote a prefatory poem for Jonson's Sejanus in 1605 and dedicated The Malcontent to Jonson. Yet in 1607, he criticised Jonson for being too pedantic to make allowances for his audience or the needs of aesthetics.

=== Blackfriars ===
Outside of these tensions, Marston's career continued to prosper. In 1603, he became a shareholder in the Children of Blackfriars company, at that time known for steadily pushing the allowable limits of personal satire, violence, and lewdness on stage. He wrote and produced two plays with the company. The first was The Malcontent in 1603; this satiric tragicomedy is Marston's most famous play. This work was originally written for the children at Blackfriars, and was later taken over (perhaps stolen) by the Kings' Men at the Globe, with additions by John Webster and (perhaps) Marston himself.

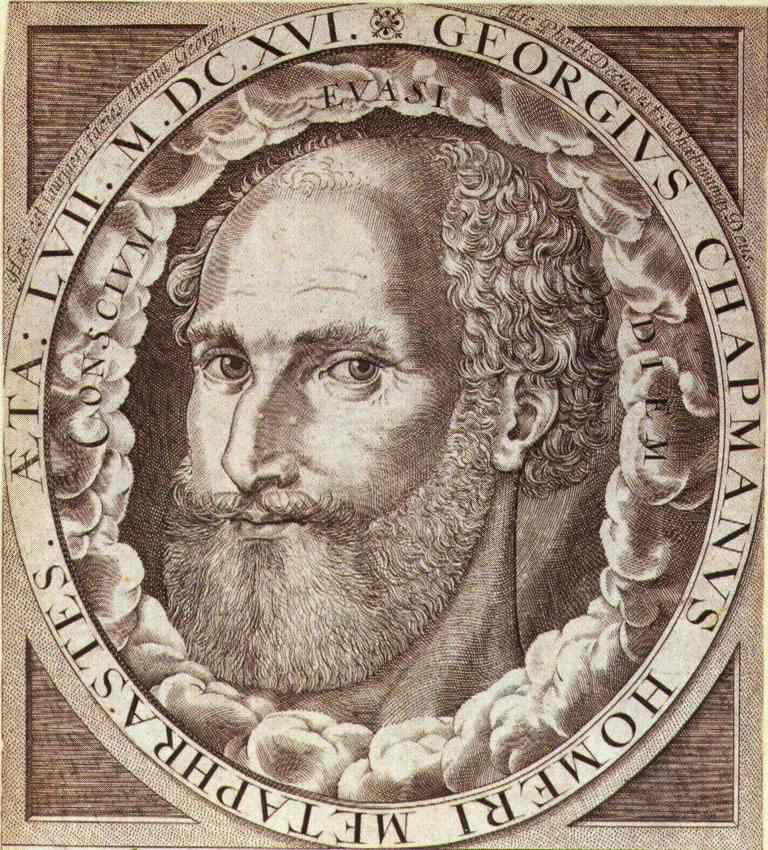
George Chapman: co-author (with Marston and Jonson) of Eastward Ho!

Marston's second play for the Blackfriars children was The Dutch Courtesan, a satire on lust and hypocrisy, in 1604–5. In 1605, he worked with George Chapman and Ben Jonson on Eastward Ho, a satire of popular taste and the vain imaginings of wealth to be found in Virginia. Chapman and Jonson were arrested for, according to Jonson, a few clauses that offended the Scots, but Marston escaped any imprisonment. The actual cause of arrest and details of the brief detainment are not certainly known; in the event, charges were dropped.

In 1606, Marston seems to have offended and then soothed King James. First, in Parasitaster, or, The Fawn, he satirised the king specifically. However, in the summer of that year, he put on a production of The Dutch Courtesan for the King of Denmark's visit, with a Latin verse on King James that was presented by hand to the king. Finally, in 1607, he wrote The Entertainment at Ashby, a masque for the Earl of Huntingdon. At that point, he stopped his dramatic career altogether, selling his shares in the company of Blackfriars. His departure from the literary scene may have been because of another play, now lost, which offended the king. It seems that the French ambassador complained to King James about the disrespectful treatment of the French court in plays by Chapman performed at Blackfriars. To strengthen his case he added that another play had been performed in which James himself was depicted drunk. Incensed, James suspended performances at Blackfriars and had Marston imprisoned. This suggests that he was the author of the offending play.

=== Later life ===
After the end of his literary career, he moved into his father-in-law's house and began studying philosophy. In 1609, he became a reader at the Bodleian Library at Oxford, was made a deacon on 24 September and a priest on 24 December 1609. Contemporary authors were bemused or surprised by Marston's change of career, with several of them commenting on its seeming abruptness. In October 1616, Marston was assigned the living of Christchurch, Hampshire. He died on 24 June 1634, aged 57, in London and was buried in the Middle Temple Church.

Tombs at that time often started with the formulaic "Memoriae Sacrum" ("Sacred to the memory") followed by the name of the tomb's occupant and an account of their achievements even though such words are hubristic and a contradiction to the Christian virtues of modesty. According to Anthony à Wood John Marston's tomb stone bore the legend "Oblivioni Sacrum" ("Sacred to Oblivion"), which was probably composed by Marston, and, according to Joshua Scodel, the short "epitaph is thus both self-abasing and witty in its novel inversion of tradition".

== Reception and criticism ==
Marston's reputation has varied widely, like that of most of the minor Renaissance dramatists. Both The Malcontent and The Dutch Courtesan remained on stage in altered forms through the Restoration. The subplot of the latter was converted to a droll during the Commonwealth; after the Stuart Restoration, either Aphra Behn or Thomas Betterton updated the main plot for The Revenge, or The Match in Newgate, although this adaptation makes the play both more sentimental and less morally complex. Gerard Langbaine makes a laudatory but superficial comment about Marston in his survey of English dramatic poets.

After the Restoration, Marston's works were largely reduced to the status of a curiosity of literary history. The general resemblance of Antonio's Revenge to Hamlet and Marston's role in the war of the poets ensured that his plays would receive some scholarly attention, but they were not performed and were not even widely read. Thomas Warton preferred Marston's satires to Bishop Hall's; in the next century, however, Henry Hallam reversed this judgment. William Gifford, perhaps the eighteenth century's most devoted reader of Jonson, called Marston "the most scurrilous, filthy and obscene writer of his time".

The Romantic movement in English literature resuscitated Marston's reputation, albeit unevenly. In his lectures, William Hazlitt praised Marston's genius for satire; however, if the romantic critics and their successors were willing to grant Marston's best work a place among the great accomplishments of the period, they remained aware of his inconsistency, what Swinburne in a later generation called his "uneven and irregular demesne".

In the twentieth century, however, a few critics were willing to consider Marston as a writer who was very much in control of the world he creates. T. S. Eliot saw that this "irregular demesne" was a part of Marston's world and declared that "It is … by giving us the sense of something behind, more real than any of the personages and their action, that Marston establishes himself among the writers of genius". Marston's tragic style is Senecan and although his characters may appear, on Eliot's own admission, "lifeless", they are instead used as types to convey their "theoretical implications". Eliot in particular admired Sophonisba and saw how Marston's plays, with their apparently stylised characters and bitter portrayal of a world where virtue and honour only arouse "dangerous envy" (Sophonisba; Act 1, scene 1, line 45) in those around them, actually bring to life "a pattern behind the pattern into which the characters deliberately involve themselves: the kind of pattern which we perceive in our own lives only at rare moments of inattention and detachment".

== Works ==
Plays and production dates

- Histriomastix, 1599
- Antonio and Mellida, London, Paul's theatre, 1599–1600.
- Jack Drum's Entertainment, London, Paul's theatre, 1599/1600.
- Antonio's Revenge, London, Paul's theatre, 1600.
- What You Will, London, Paul's theatre, 1601.
- The Malcontent, London, Blackfriars Theatre, 1603–1604; Globe Theatre, 1604.
- Parasitaster, or The Fawn, London, Blackfriars theatre, 1604.
- Eastward Ho, by Marston, George Chapman, and Ben Jonson, London, Blackfriars theatre, 1604–1605.
- The Dutch Courtesan, London, Blackfriars theatre, 1605.
- The Wonder of Women, or The Tragedy of Sophonisba, London, Blackfriars theatre, 1606.
- The Spectacle Presented to the Sacred Majesties of Great Britain, and Denmark as They Passed through London, London, 31 July 1606.
- The Entertainment of the Dowager-Countess of Darby, Ashby-de-la-Zouch in Leicestershire, 1607.
- The Insatiate Countess, by Marston and William Barksted, London, Whitefriars Theatre, 1608?.

Books

- The Metamorphosis of Pigmalions Image. And Certaine Satyres (London: Printed by J. Roberts for E. Matts, 1598).
- The Scourge of Villanie. Three Bookes of Satyres (London: Printed by J. Roberts & sold by J. Buzbie, 1598; revised and enlarged edition, London: J. Roberts, 1599).
- Jacke Drums Entertainment: Or, The Comedie of Pasquill and Katherine (London: Printed by T. Creede for R. Olive, 1601).
- Loves Martyr: or, Rosalins Complaint, by Marston, Ben Jonson, William Shakespeare, and George Chapman (London: Printed for E. B., 1601).
- The History of Antonio and Mellida (London: Printed by R. Bradock for M. Lownes & T. Fisher, 1602).
- Antonios Revenge (London: Printed by R. Bradock for T. Fisher, 1602).
- The Malcontent (London: Printed by V. Simmes for W. Aspley, 1604).
- Eastward Hoe, by Marston, Chapman, and Jonson (London: Printed by G. Eld for W. Aspley, 1605).
- The Dutch Courtezan (London: Printed by T. Purfoote for J. Hodgets, 1605).
- Parasitaster, or The Fawne (London: Printed by T. Purfoote for W. Cotton, 1606).
- The Wonder of Women, or The Tragedie of Sophonisba (London: Printed by J. Windet, 1606).
- What You Will (London: Printed by G. Eld for T. Thorppe, 1607).
- Histriomastix: Or, The Player Whipt (London: Printed by G. Eld for T. Thorp, 1610).
- The Insatiate Countesse, by Marston and William Barksted (London: Printed by T. Snodham for T. Archer, 1613).
- The Workes of Mr. J. Marston (London: Printed by A. Mathewes for W. Sheares, 1633); republished as Tragedies and Comedies (London: Printed by A. Mathewes for W. Sheares, 1633).
- Comedies, Tragi-comedies; & Tragedies, Nonce Collection (London, 1652).
- Lust's Dominion, or The Lascivious Queen (presumably the same play as The Spanish Moor's Tragedy, by Marston, Thomas Dekker, John Day, and William Haughton (London: Printed for F. K. & sold by Robert Pollard, 1657).
