= A Woman Is a Weathercock =

A Woman is a Weathercock
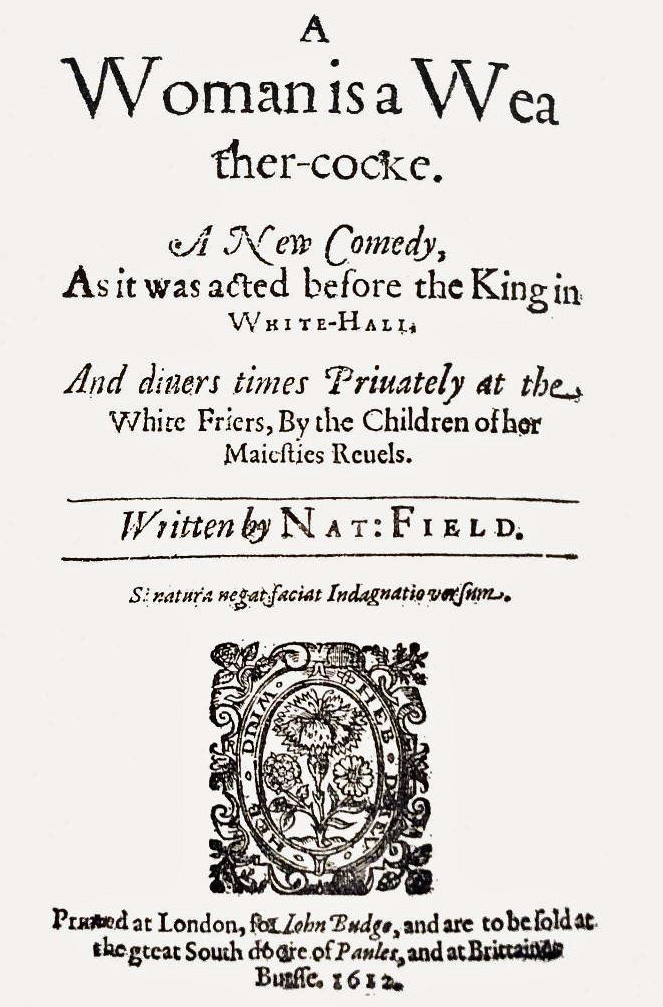
- Title-page from the quarto published in 1612
- Original language: English
- Written by: Nathan Field
- Characters: Count Frederick Sir John Wordly; Nevill; Scudmore; Strange; Pendant; Captain Powts; Sir Innocent Ninny; Sir Abraham Ninny; Bellafront; Katherine; Lucida; Lady Ninny; Mistress Wagtail A Parson; A Page; Servants; A Tailor
- Genre: Comedy
- Setting: The Neighbourhood of London

Premiere
- Date: c. 1609/10
- Place: England

A Woman is a Weathercock is a comedy by the English actor and dramatist Nathan Field, first performed c1609/1610 by the Children of the Queen's Revels at the Whitefriars indoor playhouse in London. It was the first play written by Field, who was aged around 22 at the time and for nearly a decade previously had been the star player of the company of boy actors.

Though the title of the play might suggest the misogyny that was popular as a theatrical topic at the time, in fact the main female characters are found to be innocent of the accusation of inconstancy, and the play attacks the iniquity of arranged marriages. A happy ending is brought about against the will of the central characters' father – and Field portrays most of the male characters in a far worse light than the women.

== Synopsis ==
The action of the play takes place over the course of one day when a double wedding is being held in "the Neighbourhood of London".

Scudmore is in love with Sir John Worldly's eldest daughter Bellafront but, as he is reading a love letter from her, his friend Nevill arrives to tell him Sir John has arranged for Bellafront to be married to rich Count Frederick that very day. Frederick's friend, Captain Powts, hoped to marry Sir John's second daughter Kate, but she is going to be wed to the rich young merchant Strange – Sir John favours him because of his wealth. Sir John's third daughter Lucida is in love with Count Frederick and vows she will marry no one else. The newly knighted and foolish Sir Abraham Ninny – son of Sir Innocent Ninny and his constantly-inebriated wife Lady Ninny – tries to win Lucida's love through terrible poetry ... and fails.

Nevill disguises himself as a parson – unbeknown to anyone except the audience – to perform the double wedding of Bellafront to Count Frederick and Kate to Strange, thereby nullifying the marriages, and giving his friend Scudmore time still to win Bellafront.

After the "weddings", the angry Captain Powts arrives and tells everyone he has slept with Kate "often". Kate demands that Strange rescues her honour by killing Powts and is furious when Strange refuses – he says it's not blood that's required; it's her "good name" that must be redeemed.

Later in the day Strange, disguised as a soldier, takes a letter to Captain Powts that tells him Strange has been killed at Kate's command and she is waiting for her Captain Powts to return. The Captain is fooled by this and says he regrets lying about her. On hearing confirmation that Kate has been slandered, the disguised Strange challenges Powts to a duel. He helps the injured Powts away after the fight.

Meanwhile, Lady Ninny's "gentlewoman" Mistress Wagtail, who is pregnant, has been seeking a husband. She tries to woo Count Frederick's obsequious assistant Pendant – much to his horror – but he persuades her instead that Sir Abraham will be stupid enough to fall for her and accept the baby as his.

At a wedding masque in the evening Scudmore, disguised as Nevill, dances with Bellafront and they run off together to be married by a real priest. Nevill appears and reveals that the two marriages earlier in the day were shams. The wounded Powts is carried in by Strange and admits he had lied about sleeping with Kate. Kate is relieved she is not married, and Nevill offers her his hand, saying: "Mistress Kate, I kept you for myself". Count Frederick says "I have so ruminated on a wife that I must have one this night" – and proposes marriage to Lucida, who loved him all along. And the gulled Sir Abraham gets his parents' approval to marry the pregnant Mistress Wagtail.

== First performances and publication ==
The Children of the Queen's Revels moved from their home at Blackfriars to the nearby Whitefriars when the London theatres reopened in winter 1609-10 after a long period of closure because of the plague.

A Woman Is A Weathercock was one of the first plays the company performed at Whitefriars, most probably in December 1609 before being presented at Court over Christmas 1609–10, one of five plays the boys performed before the King and Prince Henry at Whitehall.

Field himself is believed to have played the role of Nevill, the "puppet-master" of the play, in these performances. Though there are no contemporary records of the play's original reception, the fact that it was selected for Court performance alongside works by established playwrights suggests it must have been a success.

The play was published in quarto in 1612 with the title page reading: "A Woman is a Weather-cocke. A New Comedy, As it was acted before the King in White-hall. And divers times Privately at the White-friars, By the Children of her Majesty's Revels".

The printed edition included a commendatory verse by the dramatist George Chapman, headed "To his Loved son, Nat. Field, and his Weather-cocke Woman". Field had performed in many of Chapman's plays including Bussy D'Ambois, All Fools, The Gentleman Usher, May Day, Monsieur D'Olive, Sir Giles Goosecap, The Widow's Tears and Eastward Ho!

The printed quarto begins with an address by Field "To any Woman that hath beene no Weathercocke" in which he says that any woman who has been "constant" will see "what amendes I have made to her and all her sex" when "my next Play be printed". Field's second play Amends to Ladies – his only other solo creation – had already been staged by the time A Woman is a Weathercock was printed, probably by October 1611.

== Critical and performance history ==
A Woman is a Weathercock was among the Jacobean plays revived by the Duke's Company at Lincoln's Inn Fields in 1667 when the London theatres reopened 18 years after their closure at the start of the English Civil War.

There are few records of professional performances since, though several editions of the play have been published, first by John Payne Collier in 1829. An edition based on a copy of the first quarto in the Folger Shakespeare Library was published in 1950, edited by William Peery.

Commentators like Peery have called A Woman is a Weathercock a remarkable achievement for a first-time dramatist who was not yet 22 – and ascribed this to the practical experience Field had amassed performing on the stage since the age of 11 or 12.

Collier said: "A Woman is a Weathercock and its sequel Amends for Ladies are the productions of no ordinary poet: in comic scenes Field excels Massinger ... and in those of a serious character he may be frequently placed on a footing of equality."

Excerpt from a review of A Woman Is a Weathercock in The Times, 28 April 1914

R.F. Brinkley said Field knew instinctively how to cater to the taste of the audiences at the indoor theatres with a satire that featured much music, a masque, rowdy scenes, bawdiness, and quick-witted comic repartee – the type of play he had taken part in so many times as a boy actor.

In 1914 the play was revived by the Royal Shakespeare Company at the Shakespeare Memorial Theatre, Stratford-upon-Avon, in a production by Patrick Kirwan with Basil Sydney playing the role of Nevill, Stanley Howlitt as Scudmore and Lydia Hayward as Bellafront. A review in The Times on 28 April 1914 said the most effective scenes "were those in which the comedians – Pendant, the Ninny family, and the others – figured prominently". It noted that the role of Mistress Wagtail "was considered too Elizabethan altogether and had been bodily removed from the cast, but Mr Harry Gribble as Sir Abraham Ninny, who ought to have married her, found his way into his audience's heart". The review ends by saying: "The whole production was a piece of work well worth seeing."

In 1992 a production of A Woman is a Weathercock was staged by professional theatre company Trampoline at the Pentameters Theatre in Hampstead, London, from 18 February to 15 March. Jeremy Kingston, reviewing the play for The Times, said it was clear Field "knew how to shape a drama and weave three or four plots in a whole". Suzi Feay, writing in Time Out, said "It is an enthralling portrait of a society both savage and tender, a poke in the eye to the pompous and well-to-do, and a vindication of love", and Irving Wardle, writing in the Independent on Sunday, said the play was "more than a collector's piece" and led "into unexpected and human directions, entirely belying the author's misogynistic reputation".

In 2013 A Woman is a Weathercock was performed by an all-boys company from Pocklington School at the Merchant Adventurers' Hall, York, on 27 and 28 November in a production described as the first staged since the 17th century "in the style of the original players, with a cast the same age as the originals, with the actors making lots of decisions, with the audience on three sides, with live music and song and without special lighting or any technology".
