= The Gentleman Usher =

Play written by George Chapman

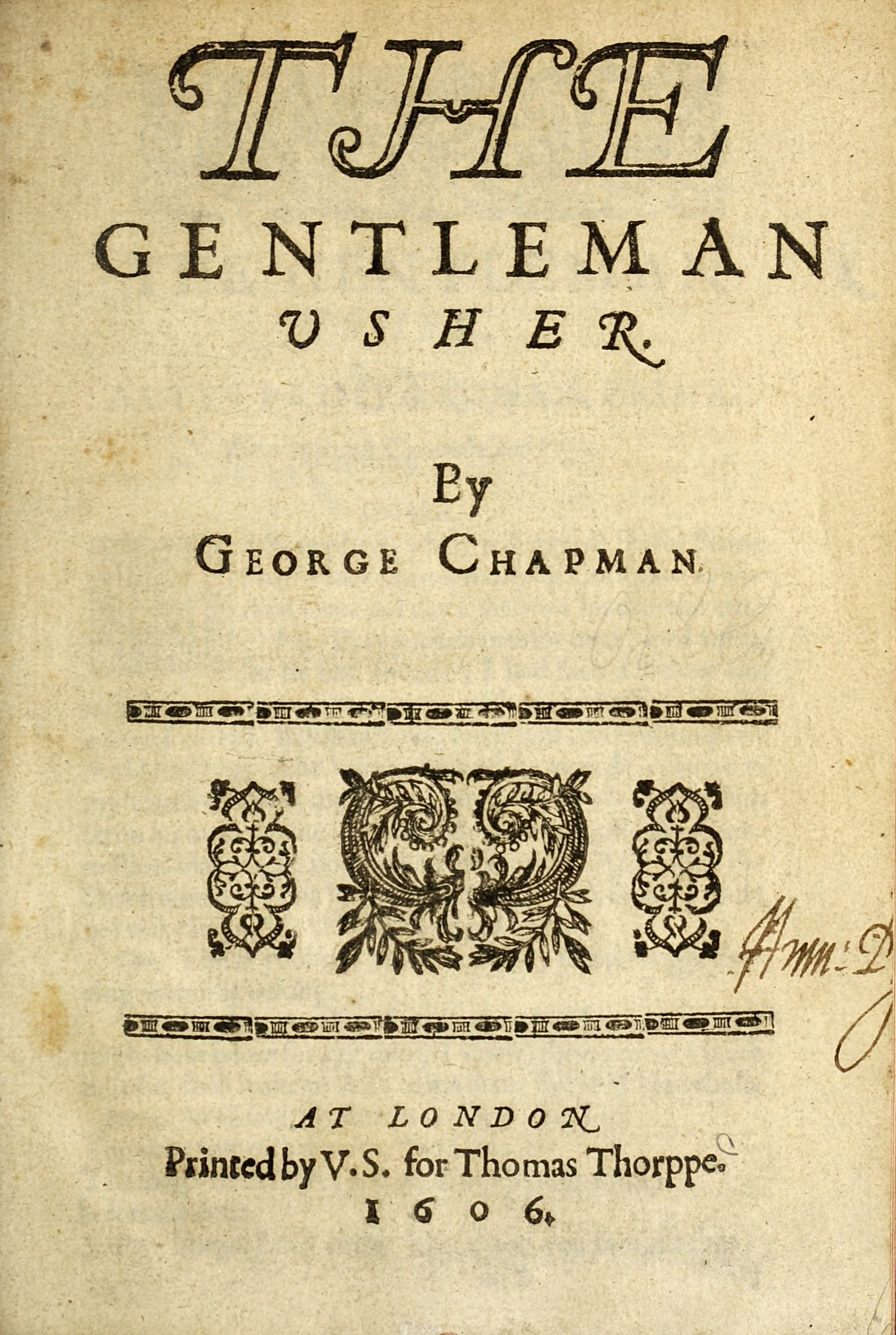
Title page of the first edition of The Gentleman Usher (1606)

The Gentleman Usher is an early 17th-century stage play, a comedy written by George Chapman that was first published in 1606.

== Date and publication ==
The Gentleman Usher was entered into the Stationers' Register on 26 November 1605, under the alternative title Vincentio and Margaret (the names of its hero and heroine). The first edition appeared the next year, in a quarto printed by Valentine Simmes for the publisher Thomas Thorpe. The title page identifies Chapman as the author, but does not mention the playing company that staged the work. The style of the play, with its two masques and its use of music, suggests that one of the two children's companies, the Children of Paul's or the Children of the Queen's Revels, acted the play. Since other Chapman comedies of the early 17th century, All Fools, Monsieur D'Olive, Sir Giles Goosecap, May Day, and The Widow's Tears, were performed by the Queen's Revels Children, it is not unlikely that The Gentleman Usher was as well. The play refers to Goosecap, and so must post-date it; 1602–1604 is a probable dating range for its composition and original performance.

== The source question ==
No specific source for the story in The Gentleman Usher has ever been identified by scholars and critics. Chapman scholar T. M. Parrott, in the Introduction to his edition of the play, makes an interesting argument about the source question: he notes that Chapman is an effective adapter of other writers' works, but not particularly good at creating new stories of his own. In The Gentleman Usher, the first two Acts are unfocused and rambling, and the story does not truly get going until the third — a defect that suggests the story is a Chapman original.

Parrott does note links between The Gentleman Usher and other contemporaneous plays. The plot element of a ruler and his son falling in love with the same woman in found in The Wisdom of Doctor Dodypoll (printed 1600); John Marston employs the same idea in his Parasitaster (1604). And the conclusion of Chapman's play, with a woman's beauty marred but then repaired, seems to have been lifted from The Trial of Chivalry (c. 1600; printed 1605); similar material can be found in Jack Drum's Entertainment (c. 1600).

Chapman took the medical material included in his play from a book written by the 15th-century Florentine physician Antonio Benivieni, though he reworks that material "with striking images and with fine poetry that have no counterpart in Benivieni."

== Synopsis ==
The story is set in an otherwise-unnamed duchy in Italy, ruled by Duke Alphonso. As the story opens, the Duke and his son and heir Prince Vincentio are both in love with the beautiful Margaret, the daughter of Earl Lasso. Alphonso's plan to marry the girl (though he is much too old for her) is supported by his court favourite Medice, a figure roundly disliked by the other characters. Medice is considered a poseur and vulgarian; though he masquerades as a great lord, he admits that he is illiterate.

Vincentio's plan to marry Margaret himself is seconded by his close friend Lord Strozza, and Strozza's wife Cynanche. The two have a foolish nephew called Pogio who is the play's main clown.

Alphonso, Medice, and the court party travel to Earl Lasso's country house; Lasso stages a welcoming masque for the guests, under the guidance of Bassiolo, the usher who supervises Lasso's household. The courtiers stage their own masque in return, with the purpose of courting Margaret and preparing her for her marriage and elevation to duchess. Vincentio and Strozza view the goings-on critically, and interfere when they can, principally by trying to embarrass Medice.

Searching for a go-between to advance his suit with Margaret, Vincentio tries to earn the good graces of Bassiolo the usher — who reveals himself to be a silly and pompous fellow. The prince succeeds so well that soon Bassiolo is calling him "Vince" and pledging his loyalty. Bassiolo carries a love letter to Margaret, and cajoles her into accepting it and replying; Margaret meanwhile displays her disdain for the usher's verbosity and pretensions. Eventually the two young people meet, and pledge their love and faith in a spiritual marriage.

While the Duke and his party are out hunting, Vincentio's friend Strozza is "accidentally" struck in the chest by an arrow; he is brought back to Lasso's house wounded. As he suffers from his wound, Strozza enters into a mental state of "inspired rapture" in which he foretells coming events; he warns Vincentio of his coming troubles and trials, though he also indicates that Vincentio can win out through patience and fortitude. The hostile and suspicious Medice recognises Vincentio's love for Margaret, and provokes Margaret's aunt Corteza to search for evidence of a clandestine romance. Vincentio's love letter to Margaret is discovered; spying on the two young people, Alphonso and his party discover the young couple's mutual affection. Bassiolo is comically caught up in his divided loyalties and his incriminating statements. Vincentio flees; Alphonso orders a pursuit, though he specifies that his son be apprehended but not harmed.

Medice, however, ignores the Duke's instructions, and wounds the prince severely once he's captured. Vincentio is brought back to Lasso's estate in a litter. Margaret is so desperate to avoid a forced marriage that she contemplates suicide, but lacks the will to go through with the deed; but she disfigures herself with a depilatory cream that leaves her face blistered. The Duke is now stricken with remorse and turns against Medice; he hands his erstwhile favourite over to Strozza for execution. Strozza wants, or says he wants, to kill Medice instantly without a chance for absolution — which provokes Medice into a confession of his faults. He admits that Strozza was shot and injured not by accident, but deliberately, because he is Vincentio's friend. He also admits that his true name is not Medice (like "the Medici"), but Mendice (as in "mendicant"); and that, far from being an aristocrat, he started out as a beggar and worked his way up to be king of the Gypsies.

Benivemus, the doctor who treated Strozza, is able to heal both Vincentio's wounds and Margaret's damaged complexion. The two are happily united at the end of the play. Bassiolo the usher is promoted to the Duke's household; Medice/Mendice is beaten and driven out by Pogio and the earl's pages.

In the play's final scene, Strozza delivers a speech that bears upon Chapman's attitude toward personal virtue and political authority:

...what's a prince? Had all been virtuous men,

There never had been prince upon the earth,
And so no subject; all men had been princes:
A virtuous man is subject to no prince,
But to his soul and honour, which are laws
That carry fire and sword within themselves,
Never corrupted, never out of rule....

Chapman's preoccupation with this concept, of the virtuous man who is his own moral authority, connects with his deep commitment to Homer, whose works he translated over many years; and it helps to explain why Chapman would soon abandon comedy, to devote himself to the tragedies in which he explored his concepts of "Homeric Idealism" more deeply.
