= Caesar and Pompey =

Jacobean play by George Chapman

Caesar and Pompey is a Jacobean era stage play, a classical tragedy written by George Chapman. Arguably Chapman's most obscure play, it is also one of the more problematic works of English Renaissance Drama.

== Date ==
Nothing is known with certainty about the play's origin or its early stage history (if it had one). Relying on general considerations of style and artistic development, Chapman scholar T. M. Parrott postulated a date of authorship c. 1612–13; E. K. Chambers judged that Parrott's date "will do as well as another." Chapman's earliest works are comedies, actable and effective on the stage; his later tragedies move away from stageworthiness toward closet drama. If Bussy D'Ambois (printed 1607) is compared with its sequel, The Revenge of Bussy D'Ambois (printed 1613), the move away from stage action and toward talkiness is readily apparent. For Parrott and like-minded critics, Caesar and Pompey falls toward the end of this trajectory. Others, however, have placed Caesar and Pompey in the 1599–1607 period, partly on perceived contemporary allusions, and partly on a view that the play's limitations indicate an early work.

(Some scholars argue that in Northward Ho, by Thomas Dekker and John Webster – a play performed in 1605 and printed in 1607 – the character Bellamont is intended to represent Chapman. In IV, i of that play, Bellamont talks of writing about Caesar and Pompey.)

== Publication ==
The play was entered into the Stationers' Register on 18 May 1631, and was published later that year, in a quarto printed by Thomas Harper for the booksellers Godfrey Edmondson and Thomas Alchorne. This first quarto, printed in two states, contains an Epistle to the Earl of Middlesex, signed "Geo. Chapman." The play was reprinted in 1653; the title page of Q2 states that the play was performed at the Blackfriars Theatre, necessarily by the King's Men – though there is no confirmation of this from another source. It has been argued that the work was never staged – and conversely that it was, "possibly with Shakespeare in the cast," and perhaps influenced Julius Caesar and Antony and Cleopatra.

== Sources ==
As the title indicates, Chapman's play deals with the conflict between Julius Caesar and Pompey the Great that ended the First Triumvirate of ancient Rome in the 1st century BC. In the play, Chapman depicts the antagonism between the two title characters, but also the pupil/master relationship between Pompey and Cato the Younger in Stoic philosophy. Chapman's sources were Thomas North's translation of the Parallel Lives of Plutarch, and the Pharsalia of Lucan, and, among more abstruse works, the Contra Celsum of Origen.

== Critical responses ==
According to one critic, Caesar and Pompey "could have been the most interesting" of Chapman's late plays, given the author's deep and long-standing interest in Stoicism; yet the play never gels as a dramatic work. "Its historical hurly-burly never achieves full form or meaning; it is ill-related to the three major characters and allows them little room and not much life." Other critics have also been harsh, calling the play "a series of dull moralistic speeches" and "a dull piece of work." A minority view is that the play is "an introspective play with integrity and clarity of meaning." Commentators have also noted that the play has a relationship with the traditional morality plays of the Middle Ages; it even includes a devil.
