= The Blind Beggar of Alexandria =

Play written by George Chapman

The Blind Beggar of Alexandria is an Elizabethan era stage play, a comedy written by George Chapman. It was the first of Chapman's plays to be produced on the stage; its success inaugurated his career as a dramatist.

== Performance and publication ==
The play was acted by the Admiral's Men at the Rose Theatre; the records of theatre impresario Philip Henslowe show that it premiered on 12 February 1596. A popular hit, Blind Beggar was staged 22 times throughout April 1597. (Performances of Blind Beggar on 15 April, 26 April and 13 May 1596 paid 40 shillings per day, a better and more consistent return than provided by most of the company's offerings that season.) The play was revived in 1601 and 1602. The work was published after its initial run: it was entered into the Stationers' Register on 15 August 1598 and appeared in print later that year, in a quarto issued by the bookseller William Jones. (The play was less popular in print than on stage: the quarto was never reprinted. This set a pattern for Chapman's remaining dramatic career; with the exception of his masterpiece Bussy D'Ambois, Chapman's plays rarely went through more than a single edition.) One extant printed version, unfortunately, is mangled, incomplete, and unusually short; it likely represents a version cut down for an abbreviated stage presentation, which emphasizes the farcical comedy at the expense of the romantic main plot.

== Plot ==
Chapman's comedy derives from the commedia dell'arte tradition of Italy – perhaps more directly than most English plays so influenced: Chapman may have based Blind Beggar on a commedia that he witnessed first-hand during a trip to Italy. Not atypically for a play so influenced, the plot of Blind Beggar depends heavily on the comedic effects of disguise. Cleanthes, a swindler and pretended duke, has wooed the imperious Queen Aegiale, who rewards his temerity by banishing him. Cleanthes returns to Alexandria in the guise of the blind beggar and fortune-teller Irus. In that disguise and others – Leon the usurer, and the "mad-brain" aristocrat Count Hermes – Cleanthes manipulates people and events to turn in his favor (and for the sheer egotistical fun of it). He seduces Aegiale; he marries a pair of sisters in his different personas – and then tempts both of them to engage in adultery, though only with himself in other guises. He ends up king of Egypt, and disposes of his two sibling wives (now pregnant) as the mates of two captured kings.

Critics have recognized Cleanthes, a shepherd by birth who becomes a king, as a comic parody of Christopher Marlowe's Tamburlaine. Even in a relatively light and slight project like Blind Beggar, a hint of Chapman's classical learning and inclination shows through. The pretend-beggar Irus is named after the bragging beggar who foolishly challenges Odysseus to a fight in The Odyssey. Some of the farcical comedy elements in Blind Beggar may be the work of an unknown play doctor rather than Chapman himself; the dedication printed in the first edition of his later comedy All Fools (published 1605) indicates that Chapman supervised the publication of that text himself, to prevent the appearance of a play "patch'd with others' wit." This may imply that earlier Chapman comedies, Blind Beggar and perhaps An Humorous Day's Mirth, had been "patch'd" in just this way.

== Influence ==
The Blind Beggar of Alexandria was hardly the first disguise play to appear on the Elizabethan stage; the anonymous The Knack to Know an Honest Man (1594), another Admiral's play, is one prior instance, and others can be noted. Yet the popularity of Chapman's play gave an impetus to the comic device; disguise plays were produced frequently in its aftermath. The anonymous Look About You (printed 1600), The Blind Beggar of Bethnal Green (1600) by Henry Chettle and John Day, Westward Ho and Northward Ho (c. 1604–5) by Thomas Dekker and John Webster, and Ben Jonson's Every Man in His Humour (1598), Volpone (1606) and The Alchemist (1610) are among the various examples that can be cited.
