= The Tragedy of Chabot, Admiral of France =

Play written by George Chapman

The Tragedy of Chabot, Admiral of France is an early seventeenth-century play, generally judged to be a work of George Chapman, later revised by James Shirley. The play is the last in Chapman's series of plays on contemporary French politics and history, which started with Bussy D'Ambois and continued through The Conspiracy and Tragedy of Charles, Duke of Byron, and The Revenge of Bussy D'Ambois.

As usual in Chapman's French histories, the characters and plot are based on actual historical personages and events – which in this case occurred in the early sixteenth century in the reign of Francis I of France, revolving around Philippe de Chabot.

== Date and source ==
Scholars have disputed the date of authorship of Chapman's original version; it had to be later than 1611, when Chapman's primary historical source, Pasquier's Les Recherches de la France, was published. Some scholars have dated the original play as late as 1622.

== Publication ==
The play entered the documentary record on 29 April 1635, when Sir Henry Herbert, the Master of the Revels, listed it in his accounts as a work by Shirley. The play was entered into the Stationers' Register on 24 October 1638, again as a work by Shirley, and was first published in the following year, 1639, in a quarto printed by Thomas Cotes for the booksellers Andrew Crooke and William Cooke. The quarto's title page attributes the play to Chapman and Shirley, and states that the play was acted by Queen Henrietta's Men at the Cockpit Theatre, as were most of Shirley's plays of the 1630s.

== Revision ==
It is thought that Shirley's revision of Chapman's original most likely took place in 1634–35, between Chapman's death in the earlier year and Herbert's record. T. M. Parrott, a leading Chapman scholar, provided a breakdown of the two writers' shares:

Chapman – Act I, scene i; Act II, scene iii; Act v, scene ii;
Chapman and Shirley – Act II, scene ii; Act III, scene ii; Act IV; Act V, scene i;
Shirley – Act II, scene i; Act III, scene i.

According to Parrott, Shirley "has cut down long epic speeches, expunged sententious moralization, filled in with lively dialogue, and has strengthened the figures of the wife and Queen for a feminine interest."

== Synopsis ==
Chapman's Chabot resembles his Clermont D'Ambois in The Revenge of Bussy D'Ambois, in that both are men of high principle, rather than flawed creatures like Bussy or Byron. Yet the Admiral operates in a corrupt and ruthless royal court; when he refuses to implement an unjust law even after the King has signed it, he leaves himself open to malice and manipulation. A jealous minister persuades the King to investigate the Admiral, on the grounds that a man with such a sterling reputation must be hiding something. The investigation turns up nothing – yet the judges are bullied and manipulated into rendering an adverse verdict nonetheless. No harm will be done, since the King offers Chabot a pardon. The King and Court are shocked when the innocent Chabot refuses the pardon offered him – for he has committed no crime. Chabot, his honor wounded to the quick, dies, as though he has received a physical wound.

Chabot has been judged as unusual among Chapman's French histories in its emotional effectiveness; where Chapman's "plays normally develop rather ponderously," Chabot shows the beneficial effect of Shirley's lighter touch.

It has been argued that Chabot is a "topical allegory on the career of Robert Carr, 1st Earl of Somerset."
