= The Conspiracy and Tragedy of Charles, Duke of Byron =

Play written by George Chapman

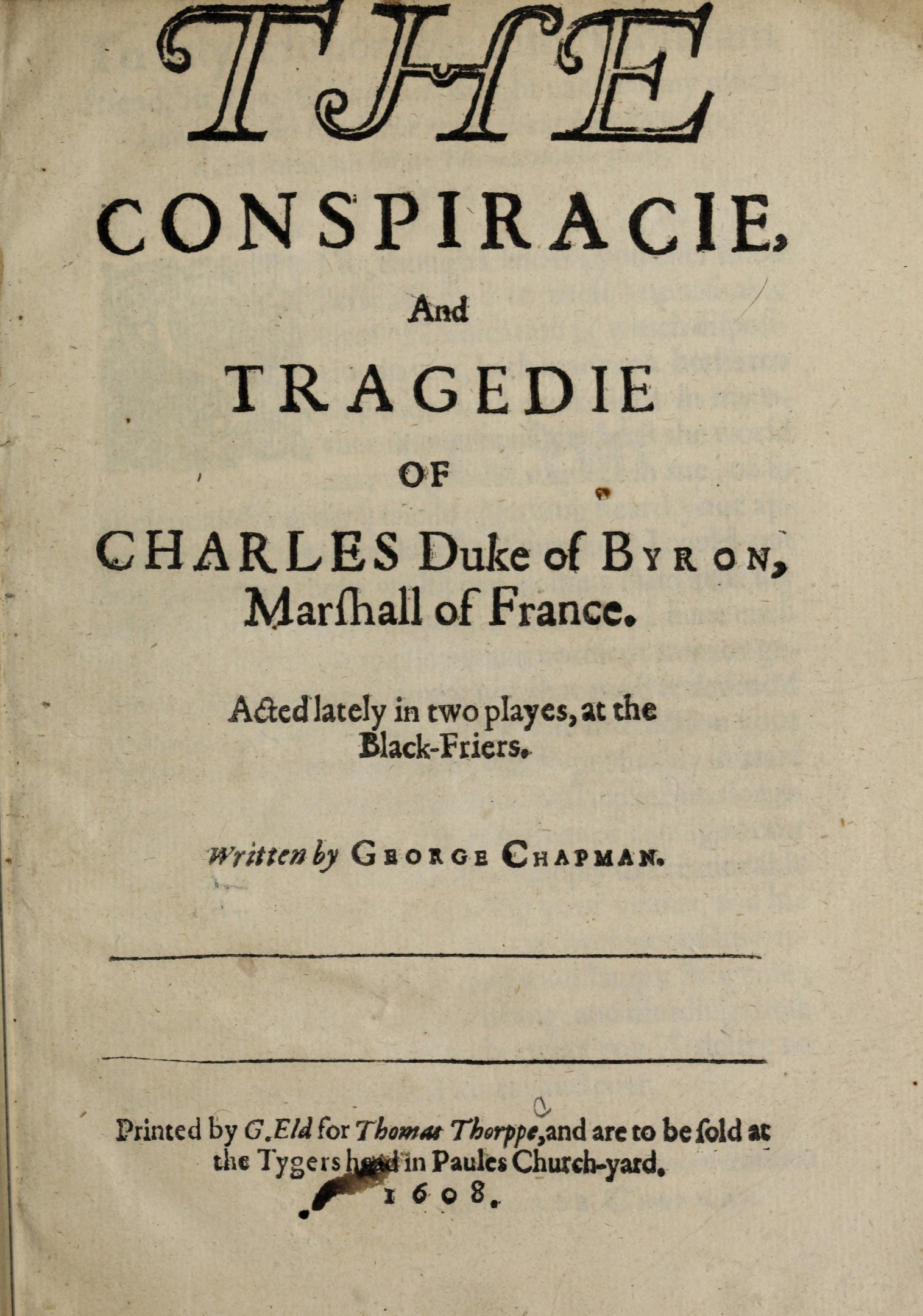
Title page of the first quarto, printed by George Eld (1608)

The Conspiracy and Tragedy of Charles, Duke of Byron, Marshall of France is a Jacobean tragedy by George Chapman, a two-part play or double play first performed and published in 1608. It tells the story of Charles de Gontaut, duc de Biron, executed for treason in 1602.

== Genre ==
The two plays that comprise the larger work, The Conspiracy of Byron and The Tragedy of Byron, can also be described as "contemporary history"; they form the second and third installments in a series of dramas that Chapman wrote on French politics and history in his time, from Bussy D'Ambois through The Tragedy of Chabot, Admiral of France.

== Date and performance ==
In all likelihood, Chapman composed both parts of Byron in 1607–8; his primary source on the political events portrayed in the plays, Edward Grimeston's A General Inventory of the History of France, was first published in 1607. The plays were first acted by the Children of the Chapel (by 1608 known as the Children of the Blackfriars), one of the troupes of boy actors popular in the first decade of the 17th century.

== Suppression ==
The original production offended the French Ambassador to the Court of King James I, Antoine Lefèvre de la Boderie, who complained to the King. The Ambassador was particularly irritated by a scene in which the French Queen slapped the face of her husband's mistress (a scene that was censored out of the printed texts of the plays).

The plays were duly suppressed; but when the Court left London in the summer, the boys performed the plays again, in their original versions with the offending material included. James was incensed when he learned of this, and swore that he would punish the players severely. He stopped all dramatic performances in London for a time; three of the Children of the Blackfriars were sent to prison, and the troupe was ejected from the Blackfriars Theatre. (In a surviving letter to George Buc, the Master of the Revels, Chapman blames the actors for playing a scene that Buc himself had previously censored from the plays.) Fortunately, James's passion for drama got the better of his anger; the boys were eventually forgiven, and even performed at Court in the ensuing Christmas season.

== Publication ==
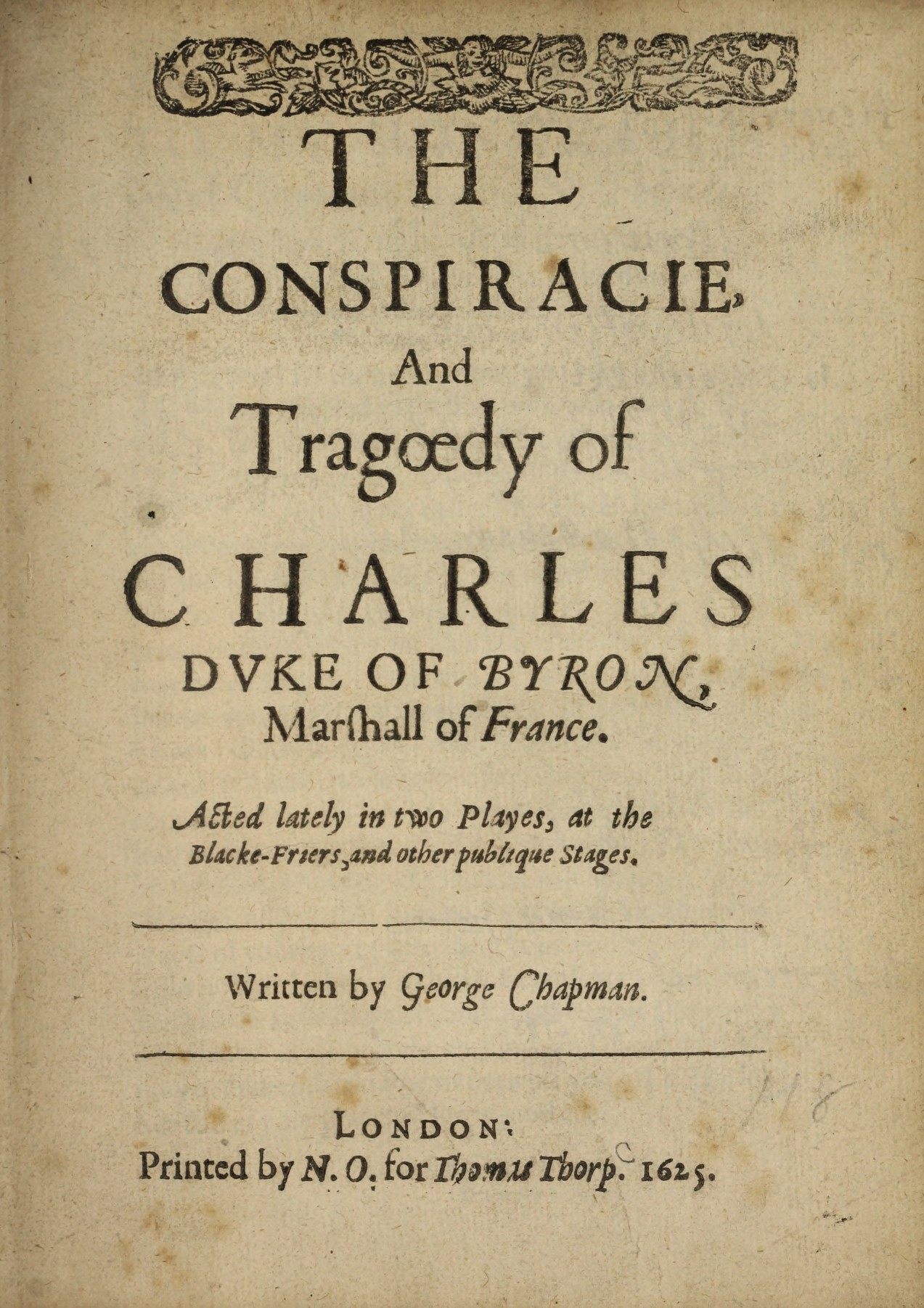
Title page of the second quarto, printed by Nicholas Okes (1625)

The Conspiracy and Tragedy of Byron were entered into the Stationers' Register on 5 June 1608 and were published together later in the year in a quarto printed by George Eld for the bookseller Thomas Thorpe. (Thorpe had previously published other works by Chapman, All Fools, 1605, and The Gentleman Usher, 1606, as well as works by his Eastward Hoe collaborators Ben Jonson and John Marston. Thorpe the stationer and Eld the printer would be responsible for the first edition of Shakespeare's Sonnets in the following year, 1609.) The printed text was "ruthlessly censored," particularly in Part I, Act IV (Byron's visit to England), and Part II, Act II (the mistress-slapping scene). The masque in II, i of The Tragedy is thought to have been inserted to fill the hole left by censorship.

Thorpe issued a second quarto in 1625. King Charles I owned a copy of this edition, and filled it with notes that compared the political situation in the plays with that of England in the 1630s.

== Synopsis ==
Chapman's Byron, a formidable soldier and commander, is marred by one major fault, his overweening pride. He loves to compare himself to the heroes of antiquity—Hercules, Alexander the Great, Marcus Curtius, even Orpheus. His vanity leaves him deeply vulnerable to manipulation by enemies of the King of France, who want to exploit Byron for their own schemes; and Byron allows himself to be drawn in. The King becomes aware of Byron's treason; yet valuing his past service and his great potential, the King attempts to reform Byron, even sending him to England so that the Marshall can witness firsthand a properly functioning monarchical state. At the end of The Conspiracy, Byron manages to curb his pride and submit to the King. Yet his ego is too great to remain restrained indefinitely; Byron returns to plotting, and in the conclusion of The Tragedy he is apprehended, tried, convicted, and executed.

As is usual with Chapman, the two parts of Byron are rich with allusions to classic literature. In addition to those noted above, the French courtier and plotter Picoté uses the rebellion of Catiline as a precedent for Byron's planned uprising against his king. References to Augustus, Nero, and other ancient figures abound.

Later scenes in The Tragedy twice compare Byron's plotting with the rebellion of the Earl of Essex against Elizabeth in 1601. It has been suggested that the face-slapping scene that caused so much trouble was inspired not by anything in French monarchical history, but by a rumored incident in which Elizabeth struck Essex.
