= The Widow's Tears =

Play by George Chapman, c. 1605

The Widow's Tears is an early Jacobean play, a comedy written by George Chapman. It is often considered the last of Chapman's comedies, and sometimes his most problematic, "the most provocative and the most paradoxical of any of his dramatic works."

== Date ==
The play is universally dated to sometime in the first decade of the 17th century, based on all the available data. Many scholars favour the year 1605; leading Chapman scholar T. M. Parrott assigned it to the winter of 1605–6. Critics have seen the parody of incompetent justice in the play's final scene as Chapman's response to his imprisonment over the Eastward Ho scandal of 1605 – though E. K. Chambers demured on this point, suggesting that "It would be equally sound to argue that this is just the date when Chapman would have been most careful to avoid criticism of this kind." Chambers and others have given a dating range of 1603–9.

== Performance ==
The title page of the first edition of 1612 states that The Widow's Tears was "often presented" at both the Blackfriars and Whitefriars theatres. This indicates that the play was part of the repertory of the Children of the Chapel, both when they were acting in the Blackfriars Theatre to 1608, and also later when the company had moved to the Whitefriars Theatre. Only one specific performance is known with certainty: the Children acted the play at Court on 27 February 1613. Philip Rosseter, the company's manager at the time, was paid £13 6s. 8d. for the Children's four Court performances that winter season, of the Chapman play and plays by Beaumont and Fletcher.

== Publication ==
The play was entered into Stationers' Register on 17 April 1612 and was published later that year in quarto by the bookseller John Browne. The 1612 quarto was the only edition of the play in the 17th century. The quarto bears Chapman's dedication to John Reed of Mitton, misidentifying Mitton's Worcestershire location as Gloucestershire. Reed was a relative of Fulke Greville.

== Synopsis ==
The Widow's Tears is set on the island of Cyprus. Chapman gives his play an unusual structure, in that he treats his two plots consecutively, rather than concurrently and in alternation as in most two-plot plays. The first three acts are mainly devoted to the subplot, while the main plot takes over in the last two acts. The two plots are united by the involvement of two siblings, Lysander and Tharsalio.

Tharsalio, the younger brother, is a romantic-comedy version of Chapman's tragic character Bussy D'Ambois – he is a "capricous," "wild, corrupted youth." As the protagonist of the subplot, he schemes to repair his fortunes by marrying a wealthy widow, the countess Eudora. The countess has taken a vow never to remarry; nonetheless, she is courted (primarily for her money) by two contrasting suitors, Tharsalio and Rebus. Tharsalio is bold and forward, while Rebus is pompous yet timid. Tharsalio's method of wooing is unsubtle, and he is at first rejected – which provokes his brother Lysander's caustic comments. Yet Tharsalio succeeds in his courtship through an extraordinary expedient: he sends the panderess Arsace to warn Eudora about...himself. Arsace tells Eudora of Tharsalio's reputation as a relentless womanizer. In the process, however, Arsace stresses Tharsalio's "manhood" and woman-pleasing capacities: "a goddess," she claims, "is not worthy of his sweetness." Tharsalio's plan is to mount a subtle arousal and temptation of Eudora's latent romantic and erotic desires. The plan is successful, and the third act closes with the marriage of Tharsalio and Eudora.

The main plot of the last two acts (which draws upon the Ephesian Matron story in the Satyricon of Petronius Arbiter) provides a twist to the situation of the preceding subplot. In their conversations over his plans to woo Eudora, Tharsalio resents his brother's critical attitude; to pay him back, Tharsalio makes Lysander doubt his wife. Like Eudora, Lysander's wife Cynthia has vowed not to remarry if she is ever widowed. Tharsalio goads his brother on precisely this point, and Lysander is so provoked that he decides upon an extreme stratagem. Lysander fakes his own death, spreading the false report that he has been killed by bandits while travelling; Cynthia, believing these false reports, is prostrate with grief. (Eudora's servant Lycus, a confidant of Lysander and Tharsalio who is aware of the plot, is the only one to protest its emotional cruelty: "men hunt hares to death for their sports, but the poor beasts die in earnest.")

Lysander returns to the city, disguised as a soldier of the night watch, to see the result of his ruse. In a series of somewhat macabre graveyard scenes, the disguised Lysander finds Cynthia mourning at the family tomb, where she has gone without food or sleep for the past five days. He cajoles and persuades her to take food and wine, and exploits her emotional vulnerability to seduce her and persuade her to "marry" him. Tharsalio spies upon these events, without realizing that the soldier is Lysander in disguise; he triumphs is this apparent confirmation of his cynical attitude toward women:

She, she, she, and none but she.
She, only queen of love and chastity;
O chastity, this women be.

Lysander's disguise as a soldier has fooled others as well as Cynthia, and he is apprehended for neglecting his guard duty; and Lycus is suspected of murdering Lysander. The new Governor of Cyprus, an incompetent and arrogant fool, attempts to pass judgement on these matters and only confounds them further. The countess Eudora, widow of the previous governor, intercedes to pacify the Governor and repair his bungling. Lysander is revealed to be alive, which resolves the legal issue of his murder. Tharsalio convinces his brother to accept the outcome of his plotting with equanimity; he asserts that when Cynthia loved Lysander in his soldier disguise, she was merely being "a constant wife."

== Critical response ==
Critics have often responded negatively to the play's cynical values and its harsh attitude toward women, and the way in which Chapman unrestrainedly exploits the biases of his era, which regarded widows as dominated by lust, sensuality, and hypocrisy. Those who have an admiration for Chapman's dramatic artistry have found reasons to praise the play, one calling it "the most mature of Chapman's comedies, the most serious of purpose, and certainly the most striking." A less magnanimous commentator once termed the play "a bad joke."
