= Odyssey (George Chapman translation) =

Circa 1614 English translation

Homer's Odysses
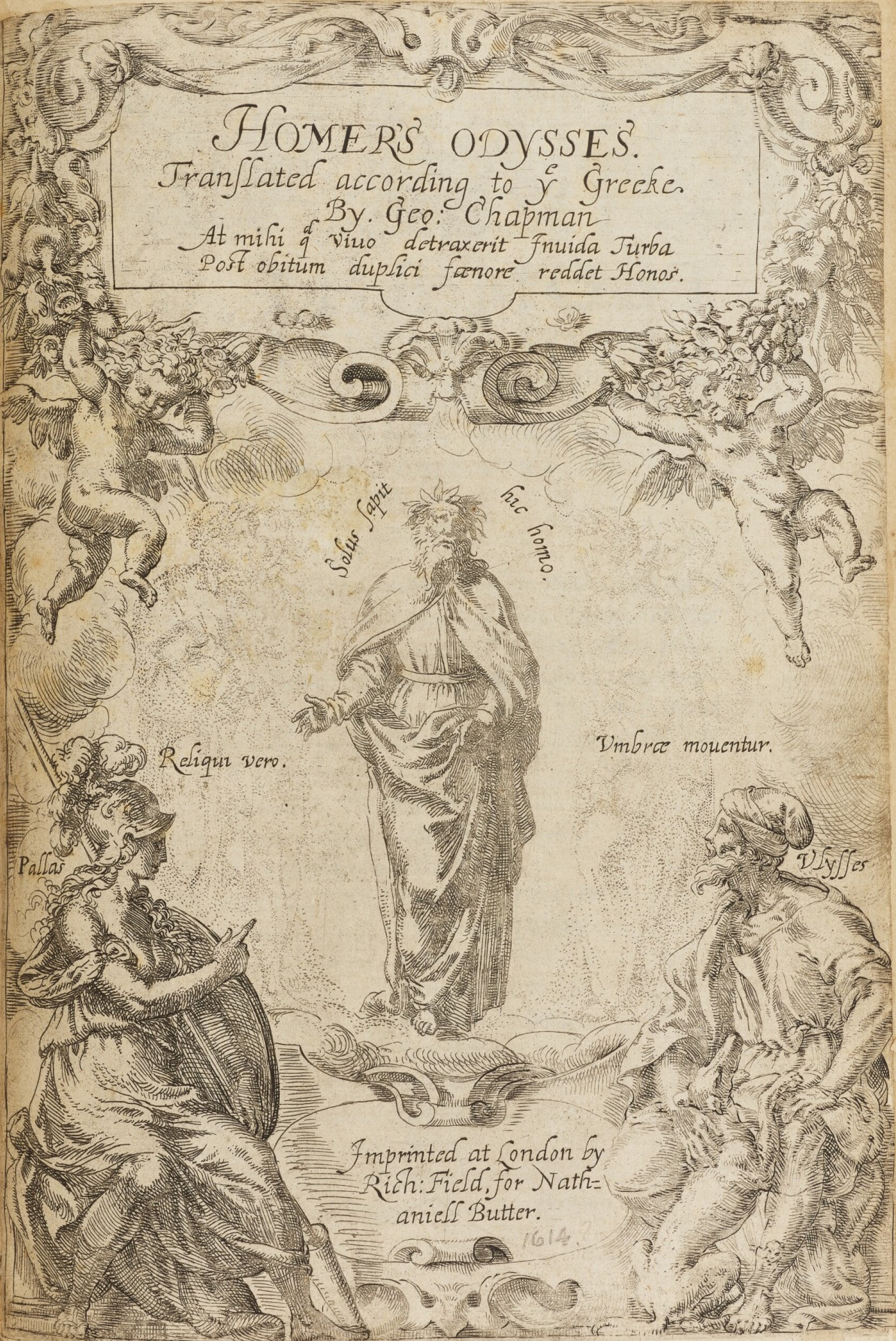
- Frontispiece to the first edition, c. 1614
- Translator: George Chapman
- Language: English
- Publication date: 1614–15
- Text: Homer's Odysses at Project Gutenberg

Homer's Odysses (Note: Full title: Homer's Odysses. Translated according to y^{e} Greeke. By George Chapman / At Mihi q^{d} viuo detraxerit. Inuida Turba Post obitum duplici foenore reddet Honos) is an English translation of Homer's Odyssey by writer George Chapman. It was published around 1614 to 1615. It is widely known as the first complete translation of the poem into the English language.

Chapman spent twenty-six years translating works traditionally attributed to Homer. His complete Iliad was released in 1611, written in rhyming fourteeners. For his Odyssey, he changed the blank verse and dactylic hexameter of the original Homeric Greek to rhyming couplets of iambic pentameter, establishing a new standard for translations of Greek and Latin hexameter.

Chapman said he was inspired by the ghost of Homer. His translation is discussed within the historical context of the Elizabethan era and is seen to characterise Odysseus as a Christian hero.

== Background ==
George Chapman worked on translations of several works traditionally attributed to Homer—the Iliad, the Odyssey, the Homeric Hymns and the Batrachomyomachia—for twenty-six years from 1598 to 1624. He was the first person to translate the Homeric Hymns into English. Chapman said he was visited and inspired by the ghost of Homer. According to critic George de Lord, Chapman believed he had "unique insight" into the poet. The translation is dedicated to Robert Carr, 1st Earl of Somerset, Chapman's patron.

Although Chapman composed his Iliad in rhyming fourteeners, he changed the metre to iambic pentameter for the Odyssey. He rejected translating word-for-word, describing it as "forced" and shameful, and added many phrases and sentiments not present in the original. He wrote that this, alongside close paraphrasing, was required to maintain the new metre, and expressed that some features of the English language—like its many monosyllabic words—made the project easier. He had previously used pentameter in a translation of the eighteenth book of the Iliad published under the title Achilles Shield.

Renaissance scholar Jessica Wolfe states that the prefaces written by Chapman for his Iliad and Odyssey translations are generally described as "arrogant, defensive, and prone to pessimistic rants", echoing an earlier critique by Alexander Pope. He also expressed loathing for an "envious Windfucker" who spread rumours that Chapman based his translation on an existing Latin translation instead of the original Greek. (Note: These are referred to as vernacular translations by modern scholars.) Chapman did, in fact, draw extensively from earlier sources, chiefly a translation by Henri Spondanus, the annotations of Poliziano, and the work of French printer and translator Henri Estienne.

== Publication ==
Chapman published Seauen Books of the Iliades in 1598, which translated books 1, 2, and 7–11 of the Iliad. These are generally regarded by scholars as being a significant influence on William Shakespeare's Troilus and Cressida (1602). Books 1–12 were published for the first time in 1609, with the other books following in a 1611 edition.

The copyright was entered on 2 November 1614, and the works were probably published around 1614 to 1615, possibly in two parts. With the first publication, Chapman became the first person to complete a full translation of Homer's epic poem into English verse. He and the work quickly became widely celebrated.

=== Frontispiece ===
The composition of the translation's frontispiece shows Homer in the midst of a company of laurel-crowned spirits, whose ethereal forms are expressed in stipple, with legends which together read: "Solus ſapit hic homo, Reliqui vero Umbræ mouentur"; or in English: "This man alone has wisdom, the others are mere shadows that flit around." Above, the title is supported by two cupids, and below are seated figures of Athena and Odysseus with his dog, Argos. The frontispiece is unsigned. The central depiction of Homer with the spirits is a reference to Circe's description of Tiresias in the story: "Even in death, Persephone granted to him alone the use of his wisdom, but the others are shadows that flit around". (Note: Odyssey 10.494–495)

The engraving is often ascribed to William Hole, who had previously engraved Chapman's Iliad, although Henry Watson Kent described this claim as "without any very good reason" due to it seeming "hardly probable that his awkward hand could have drawn the title".

== Reception ==
Chapman's translations received "widespread attention" from writers and scholars. It has received attention both as a translation and as an English epic poem in its own right. Modern reception to Chapman's Odyssey is divided. Critics regularly discuss the poem's use of allegory, an idea advanced prominently by critic George de Lord. By 1687, Gerrard Winstanley said Chapman's had been supplanted as the pre-eminent translation by John Ogilby. Ezra Pound, meanwhile, described Chapman as "the best English Homer", but noted the work was "marred by excess of added argument" and "rather more marred by parentheses and inversion". Chapman's Odyssey contributed to iambic pentameter becoming the meter of choice for English translations of Greek and Latin hexameter.

John Keats was famously moved by Chapman's Iliad and Odyssey, and especially admired the beauty of one of Chapman's metaphors: "The sea had soaked his heart through". (Note: Chapman's Odyssey: book 5, line 608f.) Keats wrote "On First Looking into Chapman's Homer" (1816) at 20. Chapman's translation appealed to Keats because it presented the Homeric text very differently than Alexander Pope's widely read translation. Pope himself commented on Chapman's arrogant preface but delighted in Chapman's clear devotion to poetry. He said "there is scarce any Paraphrase more loose and rambling". Thomas Wilson viewed Chapman's Odyssey positively compared to his Iliad.

Samuel Taylor Coleridge said Chapman's version was as original as Edmund Spenser's The Faerie Queene (1590) but provides readers with a "small idea of Homer". He compared its Homeric qualities favourably to Pope's translation, and derided William Cowper's as "anti-Miltonish". Coleridge highlighted it within an English historical context, saying Chapman's version was Homer if "he lived in England in the reign of Queen Elizabeth". Scholar Emily Wilson writes that Chapman transforms Odysseus into "a true soldier and a gentleman, a proto-Christian and a proto-Stoic, whose greatest virtue is his ability to endure suffering". Wilson writes that John Milton's Paradise Lost rejected this interpretation, providing the same characteristics to Paradise Lost's antihero, Satan.

== Bibliography ==
- Brammall, Sheldon (29 June 2018). "George Chapman: Homer's Iliad, edited by Robert S. Miola; Homer's Odyssey, edited by Gordon Kendal". Translation and Literature. 27 (2): 223–231. doi:10.3366/tal.2018.0339.
- Combellack, Frederick M. (1959). "Review of Homeric Renaissance: The "Odyssey" of George Chapman". Classical Philology. 54 (1): 56–59. doi:10.1086/364330. ISSN 0009-837X. JSTOR 266213.
- Chaix Rouchon, Béatrice (15 December 2022). "" Onely Paine crownes Worth " : George Chapman et la difficile gloire du poète-traducteur". Études Épistémè. Revue de littérature et de civilisation (XVIe – XVIIIe siècles) (in French) (42). doi:10.4000/episteme.16080. ISSN 1634-0450.
- Lord, George deForest (1972). Homeric Renaissance: The Odyssey of George Chapman (Reprinted ed.). Hamden, Conn: Archon Books. ISBN 978-0-208-01130-5.
- Homer; Chapman, George; Nicoll, Allardyce (1998). Chapman's Homer. Bollingen series (1st ed.). Princeton, N.J: Princeton University Press. ISBN 978-0-691-00236-1.
- Kent, Henry Watson (1903). Bibliographic Notes on One Hundred Books Famous in English Literature. New York: Grolier Club.
- Van der Laan, Sarah (2018). "Homer's Iliad and Homer's Odyssey". Spenser Review. 48 (2).
- Lamberton, Robert (20 April 1989). Homer the Theologian: Neoplatonist Allegorical Reading and the Growth of the Epic Tradition. University of California Press. ISBN 978-0-520-06607-6.
- MacLure, Millar (1966). George Chapman: a critical study. Toronto: University of Toronto Press. ISBN 978-0-8020-5177-6.
- Myrsiades, Kostas; Pinsker, Sanford (1976). "A Bibliographical Guide to Teaching the Homeric Epics in College Courses". College Literature. 3 (3): 237–259. ISSN 0093-3139. JSTOR 25111144.
- Nicoll, Allardyce; Scully, Stephen, eds. (2008). Chapman's Homeric hymns and other Homerica. Bollingen series. Princeton: Princeton University Press. ISBN 978-0-691-13675-2. OCLC 191024065.
- Pablo, Alvarez (2012). "The Englished Homer — Online Exhibit". apps.lib.umich.edu.
- Pache, Corinne Ondine; Dué, Casey; Lupack, Susan; Lamberton, Robert, eds. (2020). The Cambridge Guide to Homer (1 ed.). Cambridge University Press. doi:10.1017/9781139225649. ISBN 978-1-139-22564-9.
  - Wolfe, Jessica. "Homer in Renaissance Europe (1488‒1649)". In Pache et al. (2020), pp. 490–504.
- Roe, Nicholas (2012). John Keats: A New Life. New Haven London: Yale University Press. ISBN 978-0-300-12465-1.
- Wilson, Emily (2018). "Introduction". The Odyssey. New York London: W.W. Norton & Company. ISBN 978-0-393-08905-9.
