= Sir Giles Goosecap =

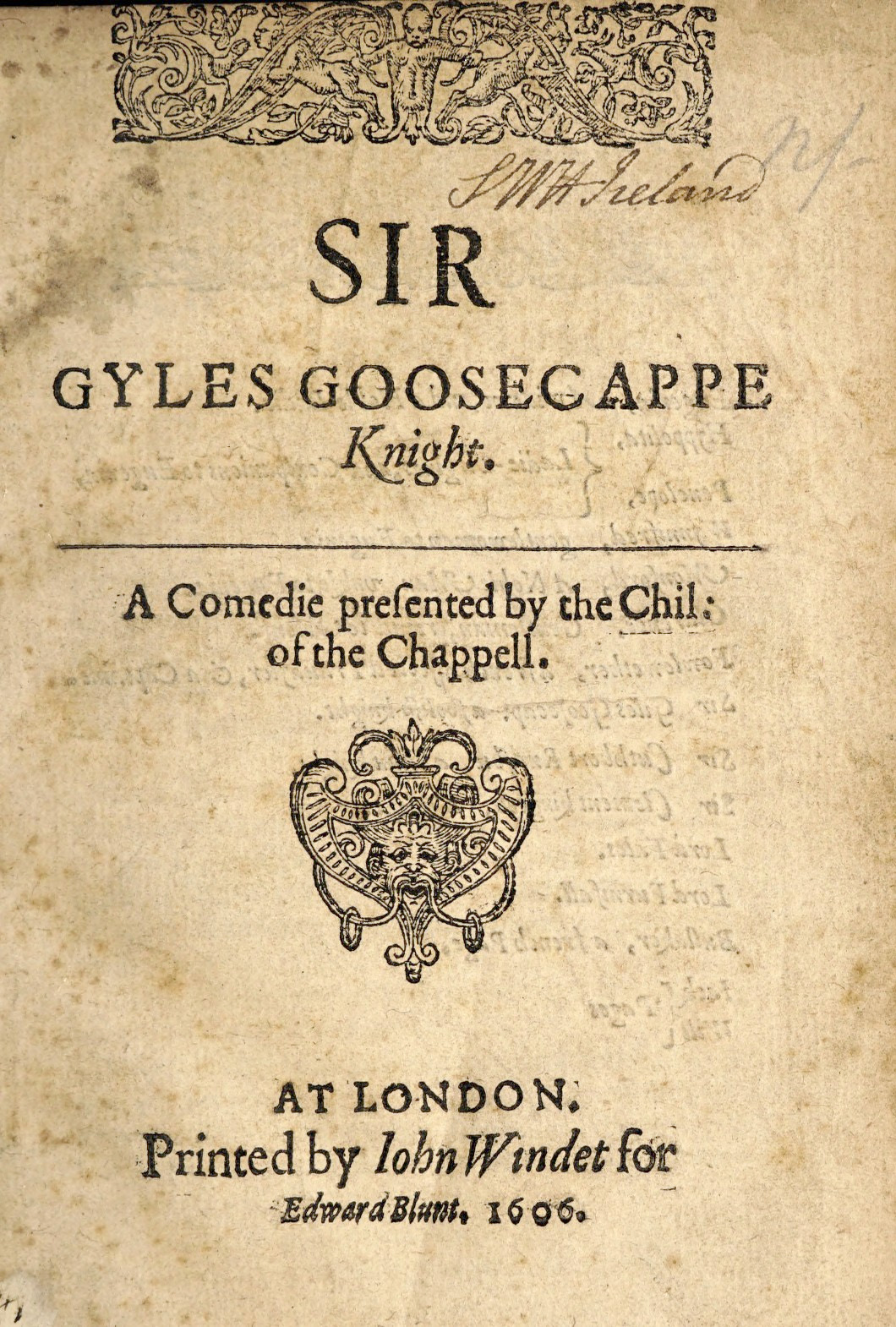
Title page of the first edition of Sir Gyles Goosecappe (1606)

Sir Giles Goosecap, Knight is an early 17th-century comedy first published anonymously in 1606, and generally attributed to George Chapman.

== Date, performance, publication ==
The play was entered into the Stationers' Register on 10 January 1606 and was published later that year in a quarto printed by John Windet for the bookseller Edward Blount. The title page of the quarto states that the play was acted by the Children of the Chapel, a production that most likely occurred in the 1601–3 period. (The Children of the Chapel were known by that name only in the company's first three years of existence, before the theatres closed in May 1603 due to an epidemic of bubonic plague. When the theatres re-opened, the company was known as the Children of the Queen's Revels or variations thereof.) The play was revived in the mid-1630s at the Salisbury Court Theatre; a second quarto followed that revival, issued in 1636 by Hugh Perry and Roger Bell.

== Authorship ==
19th-century critics noted the resemblances between Sir Giles Goosecap and Chapman's acknowledged comedies. The case for Chapman's authorship was stated persuasively by T. M. Parrott in 1906. Parrott's attribution essay has come to be regarded as among the best of its kind, and its conclusion has won general acceptance; even Samuel Schoenbaum, a prominent critic of authorship studies in general, conceded that Parrott's argument was likely valid.

== The plot ==
The play centers on the melancholic poet-lover Clarence and his relationship with his mistress, the Countess Eugenia. Lord Momford, Eugenia's uncle, helps to treat and cure Clarence's depression by aiding him in the realisation of his bond with Eugenia. The supporting characters conform to greater or lesser degrees to the concept of humours comedy that Chapman had introduced in his An Humorous Day's Mirth (1597); Captain Foulweather, for example, is an extreme Francophile who not only embraces French ways but rejects English manners — and English women.

Superficially, the play is a farce about "gulled knights and waggish servants," though it has also been perceived to possess deeper levels of meaning; critics have judged it a "rarefied, pedantic neo-platonic allegory" as well as "a modern dress version of the Troilus story, based primarily on Chaucer's account and on Estienne Tabourot's Les apothegmes du sieur Gaulard."
