= On First Looking into Chapman's Homer =

1816 sonnet by John Keats

"On First Looking into Chapman's Homer" is a sonnet written by the English Romantic poet John Keats. Written in October 1816, it tells of Keats' sense of wonder and amazement upon first reading the translation of the Odyssey by Elizabethan playwright George Chapman. The poem has become an oft-quoted classic that is cited to demonstrate the emotional power of a great work of art and its ability to evoke an epiphany in its beholder.

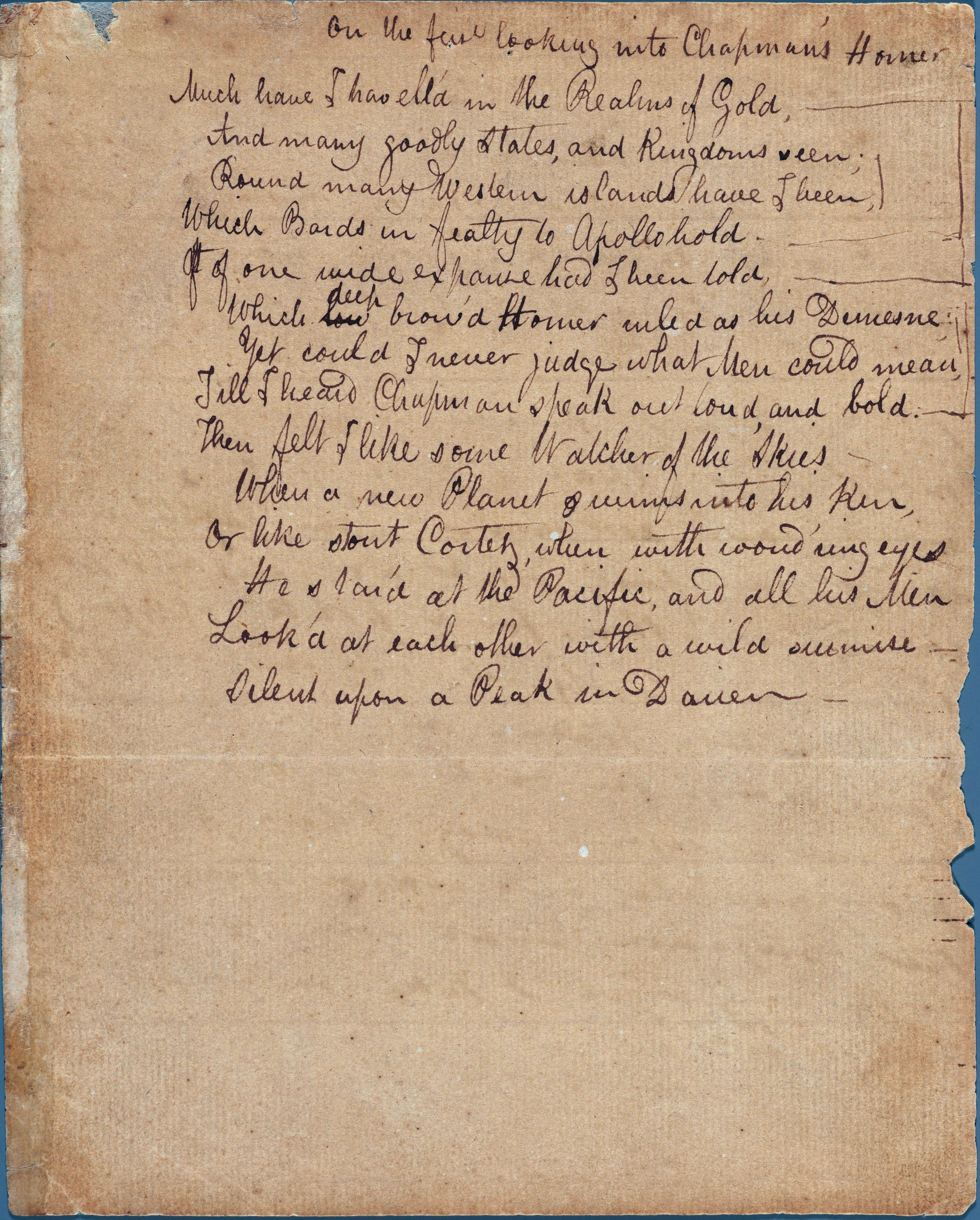
Autograph manuscript of an early draft of the poem (Harvard Library)

== Background ==
Keats's generation was familiar enough with the polished literary translation of Alexander Pope in heroic couplets, of which both Charles Cowden Clarke and John Keats had a scrappy awareness. Chapman's vigorous and earthy paraphrase (1616) was put before Keats by Clarke, a friend from his days as a pupil at a boarding school in Enfield Town who was integral in Keats’s poetic education. Charles Cowden Clarke had been lent a copy of Chapman's Homer that was circulating around friends of Leigh Hunt,. They sat up together till daylight to read it, "Keats shouting with delight as some passage of especial energy struck his imagination. At ten o'clock the next morning, Mr. Clarke found the sonnet on his breakfast-table."

== Poem ==
Leonard Wilson’s LibriVox reading of the poem

Much have I travell'd in the realms of gold,
And many goodly states and kingdoms seen;
Round many western islands have I been
Which bards in fealty to Apollo hold.
Oft of one wide expanse had I been told
That deep-brow'd Homer ruled as his demesne;
Yet did I never breathe its pure serene
Till I heard Chapman speak out loud and bold:
Then felt I like some watcher of the skies
When a new planet swims into his ken;
Or like stout Cortez when with eagle eyes
He stared at the Pacific—and all his men
Look'd at each other with a wild surmise—
Silent, upon a peak in Darien.

== Composition ==
This poem is a Petrarchan sonnet in form, the first eight lines (the octave) describing the poet's state before his encounter with Chapman's version of Homer and the final six (the sestet) his subsequent sense of discovery afterwards. This he compares to William Herschel's discovery of the new planet Uranus in 1781, and to the first sight of the Pacific by a Spanish Conquistador in 1513, both important advances in human knowledge about which he had read while at school. Now he draws a parallel in the poem between the extension of his knowledge through books and its more immediate expansion through reading the night before.

The sonnet was first published in The Examiner on 1 December 1816. It was later published in a collection called Poems in 1817. But there were a number of changes made by Keats in versions sent to friends and later to the publisher. Most notably, Homer had at first been described as "low-brow'd" rather than "deep-brow'd"; the seventh line had originally read "Yet could I never judge what Men could mean" and was only changed to "Yet did I never breathe its pure serene" upon book publication; and "eagle eyes" was substituted for the "wondr'ing eyes" of Cortez.

== Analysis ==
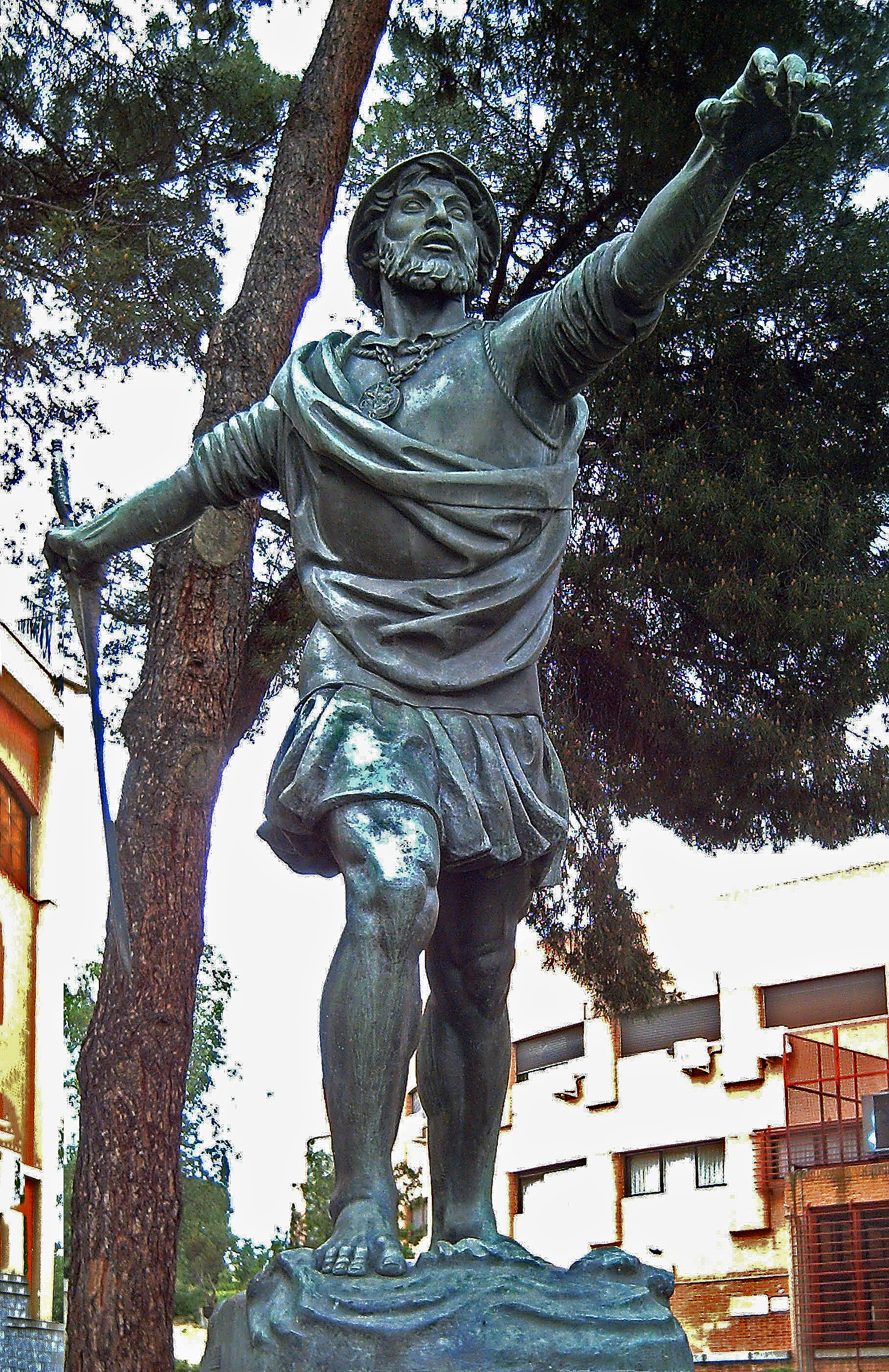
Statue in Madrid of Vasco Núñez de Balboa reaching forward; he led the first Europeans to see the Pacific Ocean.

The "realms of gold" in the opening line seem to imply worldly riches until the name of Homer appears, then they are recognised as literary and cultural realms. The gold in this case refers to the intellectual and emotional rewards of literature. Of the many deities worshipped in the cultures of the Aegean, the god to whom the bards owe the most in fealty is Apollo, the leader of the inspiring Muses and Greek god of poetry and music. The Western islands is a reference to the Western Canon. Delos is the sacred island that was Apollo's birthplace.

The second quatrain introduces "one wide expanse" that was ruled by Homer, but Keats had only “been told” of it as he could not read the original Greek (most cultured Englishmen of the time were only familiar with Latin). The "wide expanse" might have been a horizon of land or sea, but in Keats's ”pure serene”, it is sensed as encompassing the whole atmosphere. Chapman's voice then rings out. This sense of fresh discovery brings the reader to the volta: "Then felt I...".

The reference to a "new planet" would have been important to Keats’s contemporary readers because of the recent discovery of Uranus with a telescope in 1781 by William Herschel, Court Astronomer to George III. News of Herschel's discovery was sensational, as it was the first "new" planet to be discovered since antiquity.

Herschel was not the first person to have seen Uranus, but he was the person to have it recognised by the world as a planet. Keats may have read about Herschel’s discovery in the last chapter of a book he won while at Enfield Academy, an Introduction to Astronomy by Johnny Bonnycastle (published 1807). The author compares reading Homer's poetry through Chapman's translation to discovering a new world through a telescope. The translation helps Keats appreciate the significance of Homer's poetry. Through Chapman's translation, Homer's preservation of the ancient Greek world comes to life with patience and perseverance in reading. Keats was thrilled by the gift of discovery, similar to Herschel.

Members of Vasco Núñez de Balboa's expedition were the first Europeans to see the eastern shore of the Pacific (1513), but Keats chose to use Hernán Cortés. "Darien" refers to Darién Province, in Panama. Keats had read William Robertson's History of America as a library book from Enfield Academy, and apparently conflated two scenes that it describes: Balboa's view of the Pacific and Cortés's first view of the Valley of Mexico (1519).

The Balboa passage: "At length the Indians assured them, that from the top of the next mountain they should discover the ocean which was the object of their wishes. When, with infinite toil, they had climbed up the greater part of the steep ascent, Balboa commanded his men to halt, and advanced alone to the summit, that he might be the first who should enjoy a spectacle which he had so long desired. As soon as he beheld the South Sea stretching in endless prospect below him, he fell on his knees, and lifting up his hands to Heaven, returned thanks to God, who had conducted him to a discovery so beneficial to his country, and so honourable to himself. His followers, observing his transports of joy, rushed forward to join in his wonder, exultation, and gratitude" (Vol. III).

In retrospect, Keats's use of Cortés rather than Balboa as the person to introduce the Pacific Ocean to the wider world may have been serendipitously insightful. This is because the first translation of Homer into English was done by Arthur Hall in 1581. However, Hall’s translation, while earlier, like Balboa’s sighting of the Pacific that was earlier than Cortés’s, did not have as renowned and impactful a reception as Chapman’s later translation did.

Before Cortés's 1519–21 conquest of the Aztec Empire, Cortés had been a colonist, administrator and conquistador in Hispaniola (from 1504) and Cuba (from 1511). Cortés never traveled to Darién but may have seen the Pacific after his conquest of the Aztec Empire or during his 1524–1526 visit to Honduras. Later during his governorship of Mexico, Cortés was a major explorer of the Pacific coast of Mexico and Baja California.

Since Cortés was never in Darién, Keats made a historical error. The standard critical view is that Keats simply remembered the grand but separate images of Cortés and of Darien, rather than their historical contexts. In retrospect, Keats's historical error does not diminish from the poem’s literary impact, and likewise suggests that Chapman’s inaccuracies (Chapman gets details wrong, adds entire lines and has his own interpretation) do not diminish the poetic impact of Chapman’s Homer.

Homer's "pure serene" has prepared the reader for the Pacific and so the analogy now expressed in the simile that identifies the wide expanse of Homer's demesne with the vast Pacific, which stuns its discoverers into silence, is felt to be the more just.

The Pacific is the largest and deepest ocean on Earth. It represents a vast and deep new frontier that has an all-encompassing influence on the islands (Homer is the original influence for other poets) and facilitates connection and cultural exchange between communities. Cortés wonders at the ocean’s significance and beauty, and his understanding of the world is transformed by contemplating the encounter.

Keats felt amazed by the beauty and meaning of Homer’s poetry when he read Chapman's translation. He compared it to discovering the Pacific, due to its vastness (large cast of characters in a 10-year war who span the emotional palette), depth (in the sense that literature rewards close reading, in the depth of motivations and emotions, the depth to which the themes of mortality, destiny, morality, identity inform the human condition), and Homer's influence as the first and greatest written poet in the Western Canon. He enjoyed (particularly with Clarke, with whom the poem was first commemorated before being extended to the public) how poetry can connect people in shared wonder and contemplation.

Keats’s poetry engages the old (Uranus, the Pacific, Homer) poems with new perspective. It emphasises a sense of wonder, inspiration, joy, excitement, adventure and possibility at discovering the amazing believed to be made accessible in Herschel’s and Cortés’s findings and Chapman’s English.

== Cultural references ==
- Edgar Allan Poe was inspired by Keats's writing about the discovery of Uranus when he wrote his early poem "Al Aaraaf" (1829).
- Frances Power Cobbe analysed the poem in her essay "The Peak in Darien: the riddle of death" in The Peak in Darien with some other inquiries touching concerns of the soul and the body: an octave of essays, Boston. 1882.
