= The Revenge of Bussy D'Ambois =

Play written by George Chapman

The Revenge of Bussy D'Ambois is a Jacobean revenge tragedy written by George Chapman. The Revenge is a sequel to his earlier Bussy D'Ambois, and was first published in 1613.

== Genre and source ==
The Revenge of Bussy is one in Chapman's series of plays on then-recent French history and politics, blending the genres of tragedy and history. The play was preceded by the original Bussy D'Ambois and The Conspiracy and Tragedy of Charles, Duke of Byron, and followed by The Tragedy of Chabot, Admiral of France. As with the two Byron plays, Chapman's primary source for The Revenge was Edward Grimeston's A General Inventory of the History of France (1607). The historical events depicted in The Revenge occurred in 1588, during the reign of Henri III.

== Performance and publication ==
The Revenge was entered into the Stationers' Register on 17 April 1612. It was published the next year, in a quarto printed by Thomas Snodham for the bookseller John Helme. The title page of the quarto states that the play was acted by the Children of the Chapel, then known as the Children of the Whitefriars; the sequel is thought to have been performed in conjunction with Chapman's original Bussy play. In the quarto the play is prefaced by an Epistle by Chapman, addressed to Sir Thomas Howard (second son of the first Earl of Suffolk), later Earl of Berkshire.

== Synopsis ==
The Revenge tells the story of Clermont D'Ambois, the brother of the dead Bussy. Unlike the ruthless Bussy, Clermont is a Christian Stoic. Clermont is a follower of the Duc de Guise, a powerful nobleman—though this relationship breeds suspicion in the King, who is urged on by the political manipulator Baligny. (Malicious characters in the play see Clermont's devotion to the Guise in homoerotic terms; but the stoical Clermont prefers relations with men over those with women, precisely because they are asexual.) Eventually Guise is assassinated, and Clermont commits suicide. A subplot involves the relationship between Clermont and Tamyra, Bussy's former lover; Tamyra (Françoise de Maridor) urges Clermont to take vengeance on her husband Montsurry (Charles of Chambes count of Montsoreau), the agent of Bussy's destruction. The cowardly Montsurry manages to avoid a confrontation with Clermont through most of the play; but in the final Act, Bussy's ghost rises to tell Clermont that divine justice demands the punishment of Montsurry. Clermont finally persuades Montsurry to face him on the field of honor and accept his death.

The Stoic nature of the play extends beyond the values and worldview of the character Clermont. In The Revenge of Bussy D'Ambois, even more so than in other Chapman plays, events are reported rather than enacted, and little actually happens on stage. This has prevented the play from earning itself a significant stage history.
