= An Humorous Day's Mirth =

Play written by George Chapman

An Humorous Day's Mirth is an Elizabethan era stage play, a comedy by George Chapman, first acted in 1597 and published in 1599.

Algernon Charles Swinburne identified the play as an important one in the development of the comedy of humours; in particular, An Humorous Day's Mirth was first performed just a year before Ben Jonson's Every Man in his Humour.

== Performance ==
An Humorous Day's Mirth was performed by the Admiral's Men at the Rose Theatre; it has been identified with the "Humours" play that the company acted on Thursday 11 May 1597, as described in a contemporary letter to Dudley Carleton from John Chamberlain. Philip Henslowe's diary, which covers performances at the Rose at this time, marks the play as 'ne' on this date while Chamberlain's comment that he had been drawn to the play by the 'common applause' suggests that he saw one of the five performances between 11 May and before the writing of the letter which is dated 11 June 1597.

Chamberlain described the play as being 'in very great request' but his own impression of it differed. He draws on an agricultural colloquialism to inform Carleton that, in his opinion, '(as the fellow saide of the shearing of hogges), that there was a great crie for so litle wolle.'

A 1598 inventory of the Admiral's properties lists items of clothing in the costumes of specific characters in the play.

== Publication ==
The 1599 quarto, the only edition of the play in the seventeenth century, was printed and published by Valentine Simmes, who is generally recognized as one of the best London printers of his generation; Simmes printed nine Shakespeare quartos in the 1597–1604 period. The quality of Simmes's work is evident in the Chapman volume: "A shop proofreader was especially careful in correcting the first quarto edition...."

== Text ==
Despite the quality of the quarto, the text given to the printer must have possessed significant deficiencies. "The text...is so corrupt, and the stage directions are so infrequent and confusing, that it is extremely difficult to follow the story." The play was probably "altered and published without the author's supervision." In the first edition of a later Chapman comedy, All Fools (1605), the dedication indicates that Chapman oversaw the printing of that play, to prevent a version "patch'd with others' wit" from reaching the public. This has been taken to indicate that the printed versions of Chapman's earliest plays, The Blind Beggar of Alexandria and Humorous Day's Mirth, were corrupted and adulterated by other hands.

== Humours ==
Chapman's play was the first Elizabethan humors comedy, drawing its material from the traditional theory of human physiology and psychology. The subgenre would gain its greatest prominence in the works of Ben Jonson – most notably in Every Man in His Humour (1598) and Every Man Out of His Humour (1599), but through his later works too. Other dramatists of the era also worked in the humors vein, like John Fletcher in The Humorous Lieutenant (c. 1619) and James Shirley in The Humorous Courtier (1631).

In the prevailing theory of the time, the physically and emotionally healthy human being has his or her "humors" in a general balance; Chapman's comic characters illustrate various extremes of imbalance of humors. Dowsecer is melancholic and misanthropic; Dariotto is a fashion-obsessed courtier; Florilla is a Puritan wife whose Puritanism quickly fails the test; Cornelius is an upstart gentleman jealous of his wife. These and other characters show their vulnerability to folly by the end of the play. Chapman's protagonist Lemot acts as something like a circus ringmaster, presiding over the fun.
