= Fourteener (poetry) =

Poetic line consisting of 14 syllables

In poetry, a fourteener is a line consisting of 14 syllables, which are usually made of seven iambic feet, for which the style is also called iambic heptameter. It is most commonly found in English poetry produced in the 16th and 17th centuries. Fourteeners often appear as rhymed couplets, in which case they may be seen as ballad stanza or common metre hymn quatrains in two rather than four lines.

== Background ==
Poulter's measure is a meter consisting of alternate Alexandrines combined with Fourteeners, to form a poem of 12 and 14 syllable lines. It was often used in the Elizabethan era. The term was coined by George Gascoigne, because poulters, or poulterers (sellers of poultry), would sometimes give 12 to the dozen, and other times 14 (see also Baker's dozen). When the poulter's measure couplet is divided at its caesurae, it becomes a short measure stanza, a quatrain of 3, 3, 4, and 3 feet. Examples of this form are Nicholas Grimald's A Truelove; Lord Brooke's Epitaph on Sir Phillip Sydney; Nicholas Breton's Phyllis in the Oxford Book of Sixteenth Century Verse.

In the early 17th century, George Chapman famously used the fourteener when he produced one of the first English translations of Homer's Iliad. Two centuries later, in his "On First Looking into Chapman's Homer," John Keats expressed his appreciation for what he called the "loud and bold" quality of Chapman's translation, which he implicitly contrasted with the more prestigious but more tightly controlled heroic couplets of Alexander Pope's 18th-century translation, thereby using one type of fourteener (a sonnet) to comment on the other (iambic heptameter).

Samuel Johnson in his Lives of The English Poets comments upon the importance of fourteeners to later English lyric forms saying, "as these lines had their caesura always at the eighth syllable, it was thought in time commodious to divide them; and quatrains of lines alternately consisting of eight and six syllables make the most soft and pleasing of our lyric measures". These quatrains of eight and six syllables (or more loosely, lines of 4, 3, 4, and 3 beats) are known as common meter.

C. S. Lewis, in his English Literature in the Sixteenth Century (1954), castigates the 'lumbering' poulter's measure. He attributes the introduction of this 'terrible' meter to Thomas Wyatt. In a more extended analysis, he comments:

The medial break in the alexandrine, though it may do well enough in French, becomes intolerable in a language with such a tyrannous stress-accent as ours: the line struts. The fourteener has a much pleasanter movement, but a totally different one: the line dances a jig.

The poets Surrey, Tuberville, Gascoigne, Balassone, Golding and others all used the Poulter's Measure, the rhyming fourteener with authority.
