= May Day (play) =

Play

May-Day. A Witty Comedie, Diuers Times Acted at the Blacke Fryers.
- Author: George Chapman
- Language: English
- Publisher: Printed [by William Stansby] for Iohn Brown, dwelling in Fleetstreete in Saint Dunstones Church-yard
- Publication date: 1611
- Publication place: London
- Media type: Print (hardcover)
- Pages: 80
- OCLC: 228714135

May Day is an early 17th-century stage play, a comedy written by George Chapman that was first published in 1611.

May Day enters the historical record when it was printed in a quarto edition by the stationer John Browne. This was the sole edition of the play prior to the 19th century. The title page of the 1611 quarto identifies Chapman as the author, and states that the play was acted at the Blackfriars Theatre, meaning it was performed by the Children of the Blackfriars, the troupe of boy actors that staged most of Chapman's early comedies.

== Date ==
The date of the play's authorship and stage premier is a matter of dispute among scholars. The play's text shows a number of references, allusions, and borrowings from dramas current around the turn of the century, like John Marston's Antonio's Revenge (1600); the play's parodies of passages in Hamlet, including the famous soliloquy, have been widely noted by commentators. So, some critics have agreed with Chapman scholar T. M. Parrott in favouring a date of c. 1601–2. Yet the text also shows links with works current almost a decade later, like Thomas Dekker's The Gull's Hornbook (1609). One solution for this contradiction is the hypothesis, offered by Parrott, that Chapman wrote the play c. 1601-2 and then revised it for a new production c. 1609. This hypothesis, while certainly possible, has also been received with a measure of scepticism.

== Plot and source ==
Chapman based the plot of May Day, and its Venetian setting, upon a Commedia erudita by Alessandro Piccolomini called Alessandro (1544). The story, as adapted by Chapman, is a complex, crowded, multiple-plot tangle of intrigue and disguise. In the original production, "much of the play's humor probably derived from the child actors' interpretations of adult roles." "The whole play, if over-ingenious, is vivaciously written, and the characters are well-sustained."

The play exploits the plot device of gender disguise and cross-dressing that was so common in English Renaissance drama – though Chapman manages to double and re-double the cross-dressing trick. Two characters cross-dress, one male, one female. The page Lionell disguises "himself" as a "gentlewoman" in the course of the play; but at the conclusion it is revealed that Lionell is actually Theagine in disguise – so that a boy player played a female character who disguises as a male page, who then disguises as a woman.

== Revival ==
May Day proved to be the rare Chapman comedy that had a life on the stage past its own era. An adapted version, titled Love in a Sack, was acted at Lincoln's Inn Fields in 1715.

== Synopsis ==
The opening scene introduces the play's senex amans: Lorenzo is in erotic pursuit of Franceschina, and composes bad poetry praising her (questionable) beauties. He solicits Angelo (servant of Aurelio, the play's young lover) to deliver his love poems; and Angelo reluctantly agrees, though only to mock the elder man's foolishness. The opening scene also introduces the wealthy but repulsive Gasparo; Lorenzo wants to arrange a marriage between his daughter Aemilia and Gasparo – though Aemilia is already attracted to Aurelio, and he to her. The two young people are so bashful and self-conscious, however, that they tend to run away from rather than court each other. They desperately need a go-between; Lodovico – Lorenzo's nephew, Aemilia's cousin, and Aurelio's friend – is ready to fulfill the need. Lodovico counsels both young people to overcome their shyness, brings the two together, and even supplies a rope ladder for the climb to Aemilia's balcony.

The early scenes of the play also introduce the soldier and captain Quintiliano, the play's Miles gloriosus figure, and his followers – lieutenant Innocentio, servingman Fannio, and wife Franceschina (the same "Frank" who is the target of Lorenzo's lusty attentions). Quintiliano devotes much of his time and effort to dodging his creditors and swindling any vulnerable mark who comes within his reach. One of these is Giovenelle, a scholar visiting from Padua, who is gotten drunk, taught to swagger and swear, and relieved of his purse. The scenes featuring Quintiliano and his party allow satiric commentary on soldiering, gambling, money, drinking, and various other aspects of society, manners, and life.

A third skein of the plot involves a mysterious young woman who calls herself Lucretia; she is an apparent relative of Aurelio, staying at his father Honorio's house. Her unattached status makes her a target for the town's would-be seducers; Leonoro, accompanied by his page Lionell, works upon Lucretia's maid Temperance to gain admittance to Lucretia's private apartment.

Lodovico and Angelo join forces to play a trick on Lorenzo. Angelo convinces Lorenzo that he needs to disguise himself to gain entry to Franceschina's house, and he helps the old man dress up as Snail, the local chimney sweep, with blackened face and filthy clothes. Angelo arranges for Lorenzo to hear himself traduced and abused by other characters while in his chimney-sweep disguise. Franceschina, who is in on the joke, allows her would-be seducer into her house, but then claims that her husband has come home unexpectedly, and hides Lorenzo in the coal cellar. She locks him in the coal cellar and leaves him there.

Lodovico uses Lorenzo's absence to bring Aurelio and Aemilia together. (Their love scene is the only substantial part of the play in verse – unusually for Chapman, most of the play is written in prose.) While sneaking about in the dark on this mission, Lodovico is mistaken for Leonoro by Temperance, and is ushered into Lucretia's presence. Lucretia, however, draws a sword and drives him out; in the process, Lodovico discovers that Lucretia is a man in disguise.

Eventually, Quintiliano and his friends really do return to his house; they hear Lorenzo calling out from the coal cellar, and release him. Lorenzo has sense enough to maintain his disguise, and to claim that Franceshina had locked him, Snail the chimney-sweep, in the cellar for doing a bad job of sweeping the chimney. Lorenzo returns home and catches sight of Aurelio with Aemilia – not a good enough look to identify Aurelio, but enough to provoke the old man's outrage. Lodovico and Angelo pacify Lorenzo by dressing up Franceschina in one of Aurelio's suits, and making the old man think that it was Franceschina that he'd seen.

Quintiliano borrows the page Lionell from Leonoro, to play a joke upon Innocentio: the page will be dressed up as a woman for the lieutenant to court. This occurs at the party that concludes the play, which features a masque, music and dancing. In the style of the Venetian carnival, all the characters are masked and disguised, leading to the grand exposure of all the plotting and manipulation. It turns out that Lucretia is really Lucretio, a gentleman who had to flee his native Sicily for political reasons; Lionell is actually his betrothed, Theagine, who has come to search for him in the guise of a page. Lorenzo is made to realise that his embarrassments as Snail can only remain hidden if he consents to the marriage of Aurelio and Aemilia. Loving couples are united in a happy ending. (Even Temperance finds a husband, in Innocentio.)
