= George Chapman =

English dramatist, poet, and translator (c.1559–1634)

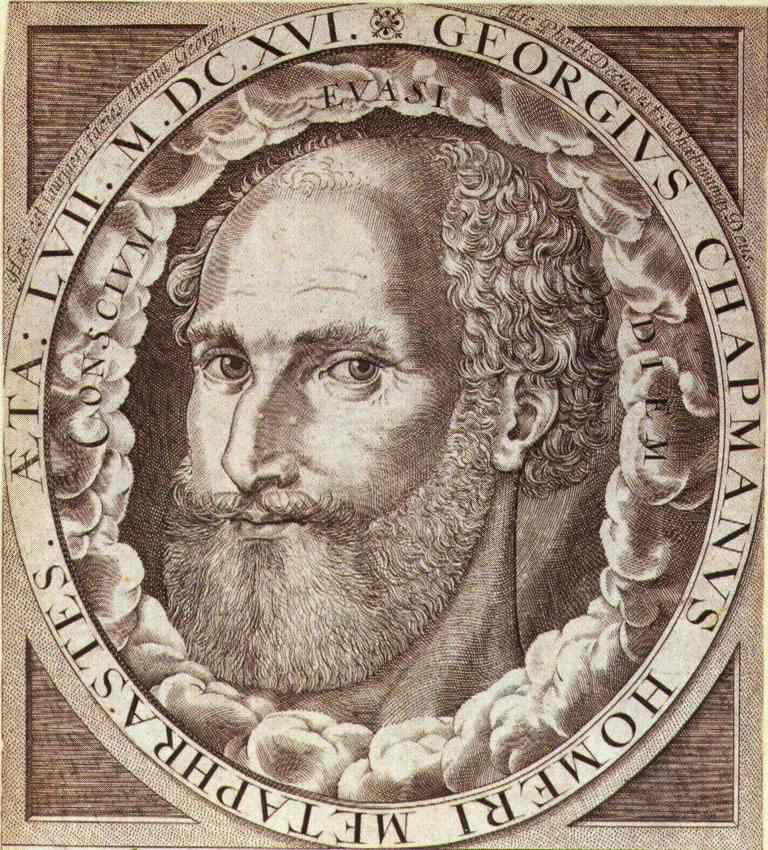
- Chapman. Frontispiece engraving for The Whole Works of Homer (1616) attributed to William Hole
- Born: c. 1559; Hitchin, Hertfordshire, England
- Died: 12 May 1634; London, England
- Occupation: Writer
- Writing career
- Period: Elizabethan
- Genres: Tragedy, translation
- Notable works: Bussy D'Ambois; Homer's Odysses

George Chapman (c. 1559 – 12 May 1634) was an English dramatist, translator and poet. He was a classical scholar whose work shows the influence of Stoicism. Chapman is seen as an anticipator of the metaphysical poets of the 17th century. He is best remembered for his translations of Homer's Iliad and Odyssey, and the Homeric Batrachomyomachia.

Shakespeare was a contemporary of Chapman, and there is evidence that he knew some of Chapman's work. William Minto proposed Chapman as a candidate for being the "Rival Poet" mentioned in Shakespeare's sonnets.

== Life and work ==
Chapman was born at Hitchin in Hertfordshire. His father appears to have been reasonably well off, but George was the younger son, and would need to earn his living. From his literary work it is evident that he acquired a good command of Latin and Greek (although he drew on the work of earlier scholars in his Greek translations). There is conjecture that he attended the University of Oxford without taking a degree, though no reliable evidence affirms this. Very little is known about Chapman's early life, but Mark Eccles uncovered records that reveal much about Chapman's difficulties and expectations.

As a young man, Chapman spent time in the household of Sir Ralph Sadler. Sadler, who had risen to prominence in the reign of Henry VIII, was a member of the Privy Council. He specialised in Anglo-Scottish diplomacy and enjoyed falconry in his free time. Rather than retiring to his country house at Standon in Hertfordshire, he was still working in the 1580s, serving as jailer of Mary, Queen of Scots in the English Midlands until being relieved of the task in 1585. While associated with Sadler, Chapman encountered two problems that were to dog him during his career: debt and the failure to find a patron who could give him long-term support.

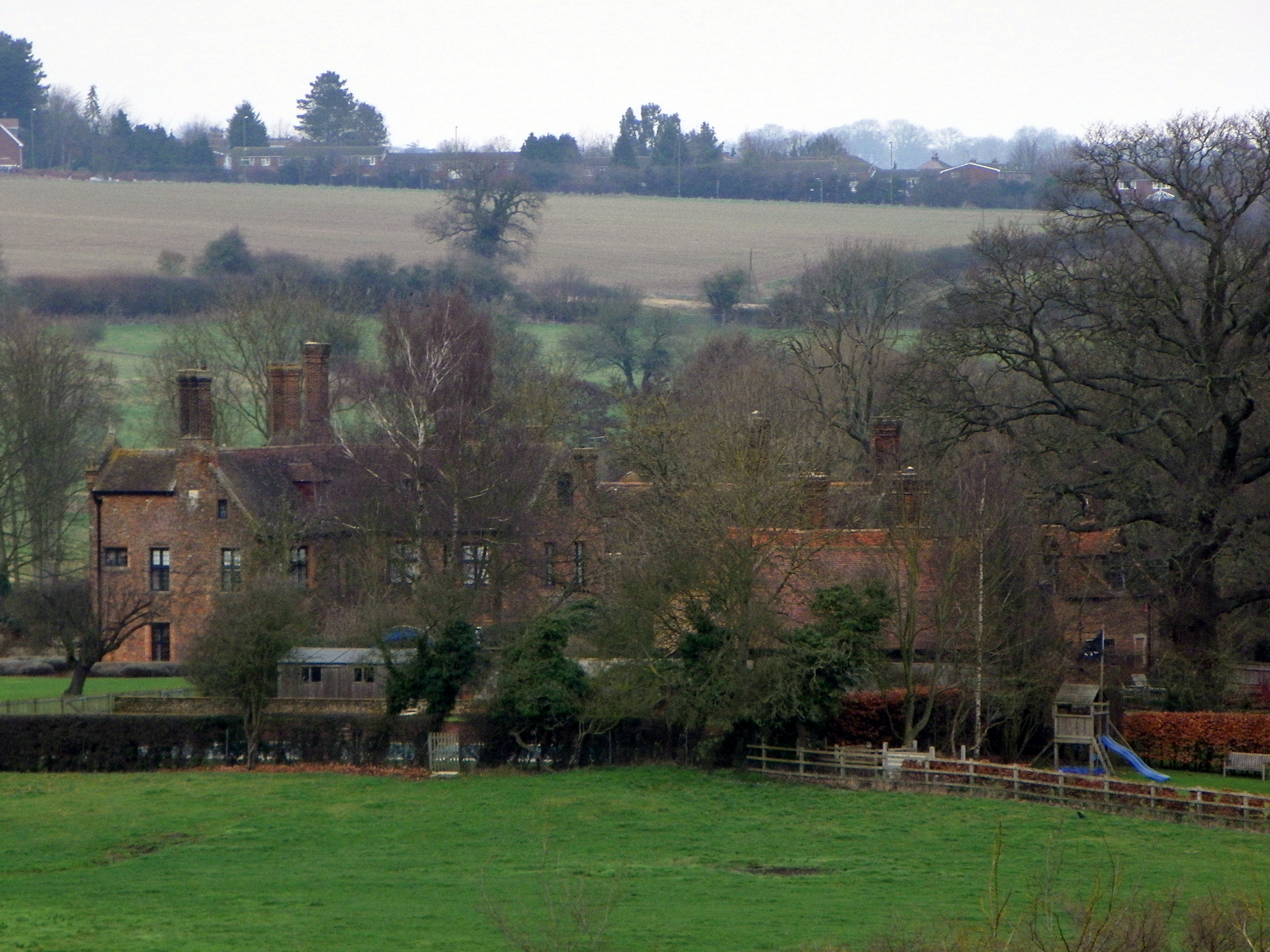
Standon Lordship, the Hertfordshire home of the Sadlers

In 1585 Chapman was approached by one John Wolfall Sr. of Silver Street, London. Wolfall offered to supply a bond of surety for a loan to furnish Chapman money "for his proper use in Attendance upon the then Right Honorable Sir Rafe Sadler Knight". Sadler died in 1587. His son Thomas was also politically prominent (James I stayed at Standon on his journey towards London to claim the English throne), but while Chapman maintained contact with the Sadler family, he spent the early 1590s abroad. He saw military action in the Low Countries, fighting under renowned English general Sir Francis Vere.

Chapman returned to England at some point in the 1590s. His comedy The Blind Beggar of Alexandria premiered in 1596. He would be plagued for many years by the papers he had signed in 1585. Wolfall, who turned out to have a history of predatory lending, had the poet arrested for debt in 1600. When in 1608 Wolfall's son sued yet again (as administrator of his father's estate), Chapman's only resort was to petition the Court of Chancery for equity.

Wolfall's son claimed that Chapman's career prospects would have been better if he had not turned to poetry. Leaving aside counterfactual speculation, he was certainly unlucky with patrons: Robert Devereux, 2nd Earl of Essex, and the Prince of Wales, Prince Henry, both met their ends prematurely; the former was executed for treason by Elizabeth I in 1601, and the latter died of typhoid fever at the age of eighteen in 1612. Chapman's resultant poverty did not diminish his ability or his standing among his fellow poets and dramatists.

At one point Chapman appears to have returned to Hertfordshire to evade his creditors, but he died in London. He was buried at St Giles in the Fields. A monument to him designed by Inigo Jones marked his tomb, and stands today inside the church. Jones was a friend of Chapman and had collaborated with him on projects such as The Memorable Masque of the Middle Temple and Lincoln's Inn.

== Plays ==
- The Blind Beggar of Alexandria (1596)
- An Humorous Day's Mirth (1597)
- Charleymayne, or the Distracted Emperor (1600)
- Sir Giles Goosecap (1601)
- Bussy D'Ambois (1603)
- Caesar and Pompey (1604)
- All Fools (1604)
- Eastward Hoe (1605)
- Monsieur D'Olive (1605)
- The Widow's Tears (1605)
- The Gentleman Usher (1606)
- The Conspiracy and Tragedy of Charles, Duke of Byron (1608)
- May Day (1609)
- The Revenge of Bussy D'Ambois (1610)
- The Tragedy of Chabot, Admiral of France (1612)
- Rollo Duke of Normandy (1612)
- The Memorable Masque of the Middle Temple and Lincoln's Inn (1613)

=== Comedies ===
By the end of the 1590s, Chapman had become a successful playwright, working for Philip Henslowe and later for the Children of the Chapel. Among his comedies are The Blind Beggar of Alexandria (1596; printed 1598), An Humorous Day's Mirth (1597; printed 1599), All Fools (printed 1605), Monsieur D'Olive (1605; printed 1606), The Gentleman Usher (printed 1606), May Day (printed 1611), and The Widow's Tears (printed 1612). His plays show a willingness to experiment with dramatic form: An Humorous Day's Mirth was one of the first plays to be written in the style of "humours comedy" which Ben Jonson later used in Every Man in His Humour and Every Man Out of His Humour. With The Widow's Tears, he was also one of the first writers to meld comedy with more serious themes, creating the tragicomedy later made famous by Beaumont and Fletcher.

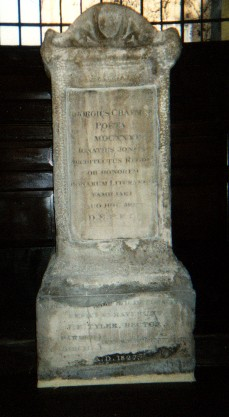
Grave marker of Chapman now inside the church of St Giles in the Fields, London. The memorial, in the form of a Roman altar, was designed and paid for by Inigo Jones, and was previously in St Giles' churchyard.

He also wrote one noteworthy play in collaboration. Eastward Ho (1605), written with Jonson and John Marston, contained satirical references to the Scottish courtiers who formed the retinue of the new king James I; this landed Chapman and Jonson in jail at the suit of Sir James Murray of Cockpool, the king's "rascal[ly]" Groom of the Stool. Various of their letters to the king and noblemen survive in a manuscript in the Folger Library known as the Dobell MS, and published by AR Braunmuller as A Seventeenth Century Letterbook. In the letters, both men renounced the offending line, implying that Marston was responsible for the injurious remark. Jonson's "Conversations With Drummond" refers to the imprisonment, and suggests there was a possibility that both authors would have their "ears and noses slit" as a punishment, but this may have been Jonson elaborating on the story in retrospect.

Chapman's friendship with Jonson broke down, perhaps as a result of Jonson's public feud with Inigo Jones. Some satiric, scathing lines, written sometime after the burning of Jonson's desk and papers, provide evidence of the rift. The poem lampooning Jonson's aggressive behaviour and self-believed superiority remained unpublished during Chapman's lifetime; it was found in documents collected after his death.

=== Tragedies ===
Chapman's greatest tragedies took their subject matter from recent French history. These include Bussy D'Ambois (1607), The Conspiracy and Tragedy of Charles, Duke of Byron (1608), The Revenge of Bussy D'Ambois (1610) and The Tragedy of Chabot, Admiral of France (published 1639). The two Byron plays were banned from the stage—although, when the Court left London, they were performed in their original and unexpurgated forms by the Children of the Chapel.

The Conspiracy and Tragedy of Byron offended the French ambassador, probably because it included a scene which portrayed Henry IV's wife and mistress arguing and physically fighting, and Robert Cecil was persuaded to issue a warrant for Chapman's arrest. However, Ludovic Stuart, 2nd Duke of Lennox, appears to have intervened to prevent its execution. On publication, the offending material was excised, and Chapman refers to the play in his dedication to Sir Thomas Walsingham as "poore dismembered Poems".

His only work of classical tragedy, Caesar and Pompey (written 1604, published 1631), although "politically astute", can be regarded as his most modest achievement in the genre.

=== Other plays ===
Chapman wrote The Old Joiner of Aldgate, performed by the Children of Paul's between January and February 1603 – a play which caused some controversy due to the similarities between the content of the play and ongoing legal proceedings between one John Flaskett (a local book binder) and Agnes How (to whom Flaskett was betrothed). The play was purchased from Chapman by Thomas Woodford & Edward Pearce for 20 marks (a considerable amount for such a work at the time) and resulted in a legal case that went before the Star Chamber.

Chapman wrote one of the most successful masques of the Jacobean era, The Memorable Masque of the Middle Temple and Lincoln's Inn, performed on 15 February 1613. According to Kenneth Muir, The Masque of the Twelve Months, performed on Twelfth Night 1619 and first printed by John Payne Collier in 1848 with no author's name attached, is also ascribed to Chapman.

Chapman's authorship has been argued in connection with a number of other anonymous plays of his era. F. G. Fleay proposed that his first play was The Disguises. He has been put forward as the author, in whole or in part, of Sir Giles Goosecap, Two Wise Men and All the Rest Fools, The Fountain of New Fashions, and The Second Maiden's Tragedy. Of these, only Sir Gyles Goosecap is generally accepted by scholars to have been written by Chapman (The Plays of George Chapman: The Tragedies, with Sir Giles Goosecap, edited by Allan Holaday, University of Illinois Press, 1987).

In 1654, bookseller Richard Marriot published the play Revenge for Honour as the work of Chapman. Scholars have rejected the attribution; the play may have been written by Henry Glapthorne. Alphonsus Emperor of Germany (also printed 1654) is generally considered another false Chapman attribution.

The lost plays The Fatal Love and A Yorkshire Gentlewoman And Her Son were assigned to Chapman in Stationers' Register entries in 1660. Both of these plays were among the ones destroyed in the famous kitchen burnings by John Warburton's cook. The lost play Christianetta (registered 1640) may have been a collaboration between Chapman and Richard Brome, or a revision by Brome of a Chapman work.

== Poet and translator ==
Chapman's earliest published works were the obscure philosophical poems The Shadow of Night (1594) and Ovid's Banquet of Sense (1595). The latter has been taken as a response to the erotic poems of the age, such as Philip Sidney's Astrophil and Stella and Shakespeare's Venus and Adonis. Other poems by Chapman include: De Guiana, Carmen Epicum (1596), on the exploits of Sir Walter Raleigh; a continuation of Christopher Marlowe's unfinished Hero and Leander (1598); and Euthymiae Raptus; or the Tears of Peace (1609).

Some have considered Chapman to be the "rival poet" of Shakespeare's sonnets (in sonnets 78–86), although conjecture places him as one in a large field of possibilities.

From 1598 he published his translation of the Iliad in instalments. In 1616 the complete Iliad and Odyssey appeared in The Whole Works of Homer, the first complete English translation, which until Alexander Pope's (completed 1726) was the most popular in the English language and was the way most English speakers encountered these poems. The endeavour was to have been profitable: his patron, Prince Henry, had promised him £300 on its completion plus a pension. However, Henry died in 1612 and his household neglected the commitment, leaving Chapman without either a patron or an income. In an extant letter, Chapman petitions for the money owed him; his petition was ineffective. Chapman's translation of the Odyssey is written in iambic pentameter, whereas his Iliad is written in iambic heptameter. (The Greek original is in dactylic hexameter.) Chapman often extends and elaborates on Homer's original contents to add descriptive detail or moral and philosophical interpretation and emphasis.

Chapman also translated the Homeric Hymns, the Georgics of Virgil, The Works of Hesiod (1618, dedicated to Francis Bacon), the Hero and Leander of Musaeus (1618) and the Fifth Satire of Juvenal (1624).

Chapman's translation of Homer was admired by Pope for "a daring fiery spirit that animates his translation, which is something like what one might imagine Homer himself would have writ", though he also disapproved of Chapman's roughness and inaccuracy. John Keats expressed a fervent admiration of Chapman's Homeric authenticity in his famous poem "On First Looking into Chapman's Homer". Chapman also drew attention from Samuel Taylor Coleridge and T. S. Eliot.

== Homage ==
In Percy Bysshe Shelley's poem The Revolt of Islam, Shelley quotes a verse of Chapman's as homage within his dedication "to Mary__ __", presumably his wife Mary Shelley:

There is no danger to a man, that knows
What life and death is: there's not any law
Exceeds his knowledge; neither is it lawful
That he should stoop to any other law.

The Irish playwright Oscar Wilde quoted the same verse in his part fiction, part literary criticism, "The Portrait of Mr. W.H."

The English poet John Keats wrote "On First Looking into Chapman's Homer" for his friend Charles Cowden Clarke in October 1816. The poem begins "Much have I travell'd in the realms of gold" and is much quoted. For example, P. G. Wodehouse in his review of the first novel of The Flashman Papers series that came to his attention: "Now I understand what that 'when a new planet swims into his ken' excitement is all about." Arthur Ransome uses two references from it in his children's books, the Swallows and Amazons series.

== Bibliography ==
- Chapman, George. The Tragedies, with Sir Gyles Goosecappe. Ed. Allan Holaday. Cambridge: D. S. Brewer, 1987. vol. 2 of The Plays of George Chapman. 2 vols. 1970–87.
- ---. The Comedies. Ed. Allan Holaday. Urbana: University of Illinois Press, 1970. vol. 1 of The Plays of George Chapman. 2 vols. 1970–87.
- ---. The Plays of George Chapman. Ed. Thomas Marc Parrott. 1910. New-York: Russell & Russell, 1961.
- ---. George Chapman, Plays and Poems. Ed. Jonathan Hudston. London: Penguin Books, 1998.
- ---. Bussy D'Ambois. Ed. Nicholas Brooke. The Revels Plays. London: Methuen, 1964.
- ---. Bussy D'Ambois. Ed. Robert J. Lordi. Regents Renaissance Drama. Lincoln: University of Nebraska Press, 1964.
- ---. Bussy D'Ambois. Ed. Maurice Evans. New Mermaids. London: Ernst Benn Limited, 1965.
- ---. Bussy D'Amboise. Ed. and trans. Jean Jacquot. Collection bilingue des classiques étrangers. Paris: Aubier-Montaigne, 1960.
- ---. The Conspiracy and Tragedy of Charles, Duke of Byron. Ed. George Ray. Renaissance Drama. New-York: Garland Publishing, 1979.
- ---. The Conspiracy and Tragedy of Charles Duke of Byron. Ed. John Margeson. The Revels Plays. Manchester: Manchester UP, 1988.
- ---. The Revenge of Bussy D'Ambois. Introd. David P. Willbern. Menston: The Scolar Press Limited, 1968.
- ---. The Revenge of Bussy D'Ambois. Ed. Robert J. Lordi. Salzburg Studies in English Literature. Jacobean Drama Studies 75. Salzbourg: Institut für Englische Sprache und Literatur, 1977.
- ---. The Revenge of Bussy D'Ambois in Four Revenge Tragedies. Ed. Katharine Eisaman Maus. Oxford English Drama. Oxford: OUP, 1995.
- ---. The Tragedie of Chabot Admirall of France. Ed. Ezra Lehman. Philology and Literature 10. Philadelphia: Publications of the University of Philadelphia, 1906.
- ---. The Gentleman Usher. Ed. John Hazel Smith. Regents Renaissance Drama Series. Lincoln: University of Nebraska Press, 1970.
- ---. The Poems of George Chapman. Ed. Phyllis Brooks Bartlett. New-York: Modern Language Association of America, 1941.
- ---. Selected Poems. Ed. Eirian Wain. Manchester: Carcanet – Fyfield Books, 1978.
- ---. Ouids Banquet of Sence. A Coronet for his Mistresse Philosophie, and his Amorous Zodiacke. With a Translation of a Latine Coppie, Written by a Fryer, Anno Dom. 1400. London: I. R. for Richard Smith, 1595. Menston: The Scolar Press Limited, 1970.
- Chapman, George, trans. Homer's Odyssey. Ed. Gordon Kendal. London: MHRA, 2016.
- ---. The Works of George Chapman: Homer's Iliad and Odyssey. Ed. Richard Herne Shepherd. London: Chatto & Windus, 1875.
- ---. Chapman's Homer: The Iliad. Ed. Allardyce Nicoll. Bollingen Series 41. Princeton: Princeton UP, 1998.
- ---. Chapman's Homer: The Odyssey. Ed. Allardyce Nicoll. Bollingen Series 41. Princeton: Princeton UP, 2000.
- ---. George Chapman's Minor Translations: A Critical Edition of His Renderings of Musæus, Hesiod and Juvenal. Ed. Richard Corballis. Salzburg Studies in English Literature: Jacobean Drama Studies, 98. Salzbourg: Institut für Anglistik und Amerikanistik, 1984.
- ---. Homer's Batrachomyomachia, Hymns and Epigrams, Hesiod's Works and Days, Musæus' Hero and Leander, Juvenal's Fifth Satire. Ed. Richard Hooper. London: John Russel Smith, 1858.
- Chapman, George, Benjamin Jonson et John Marston. Eastward Hoe. Ed. Julia Hamlet Harris. Yale Studies in English 73. New Haven: Yale UP, 1926.
- ---. Eastward Ho. Ed. R. W. Van Fossen. The Revels Plays. Manchester: Manchester UP, 1979.

== See also ==
- Rival Poet
- The School of Night
- Thomas Marc Parrott
- Louis de Bussy d'Amboise
- Charles de Gontaut, duc de Biron
