= Françoise de Maridor =

French courtier and lady in waiting

Françoise de Maridor (c. 1558 - 29 September 1620) was a French courtier and a lady in waiting to Catherine de Medici.

She was born at the Château de la Freslonnière around 1558, the daughter of Olivier de Maridor, lord of Vaux-en-Belin, Saint-Ouen, La Freslonnière, and Château-Sénéchal and Anne daughter of Jacques I er Goyon de Matignon. During her first marriage in 1574, she married Jean de Coësmes, lord of Lucé, one of the richest lords of Sarthe . He died facing the Huguenots, during the siege of Lusignan in December 1574 or January 1575.

Widowed, she was courted by Charles de La Rochefoucauld - Randan (nephew of François III de La Rochefoucauld ) and Jean III or II de Beaumanoir - Lavardin, who end up fighting for her (in May 1575, Beaumanoir kills Randan in a duel and took refuge with Henri de Navarre in Gascony). She finally remarried on January 10, 1576, with Charles de Chambes, Count de Montsoreau, Chambellan and Grand-hunter of the Duke of Alençon and of Anjou.

She had four daughters and two sons:

- René de Chambes (around 1587–1649)
- Charles de Chambes (1594-1640)
- Marguerite de Chambes (circa 1590–1634)
- Françoise de Chambes
- Françoise de Chambes
- Suzanne de Chambes (1600-1625)

== La Dame de Monsoreau ==
In the novel La Dame de Monsoreau by Alexandre Dumas, she was renamed "Diane de Méridor".

== Bibliography ==
- André Joubert, Un mignon de la cour de Henri III : Louis de Clermont, sieur de Bussy d'Amboise, gouverneur d'Anjou, Paris, Librairie E. Lechevalier, 1885, VIII-280 p. (présentation en ligne [archive], lire en ligne [archive]), [présentation en ligne [archive]], [présentation en ligne [archive]].
- Jacques Levron, La véritable histoire de la dame de Montsoreau, Rennes, Éditions Ouest-France, 2012 (1re éd. 1938, Société d'éditions et d'imprimerie), 104 p. (ISBN 978-2-7373-5801-2, présentation en ligne [archive]).
- Léo Mouton, Bussy d'Amboise et Madame de Montsoreau, d'après des documents inédits, Paris, Librairie Hachette et Cie, 1912, 358 p. (présentation en ligne [archive]).
