= Bussy D'Ambois =

Play written by George Chapman

Bussy D'Ambois: A Tragedie: As It hath been often Performed at Paules
- Written by: George Chapman
- Characters: Bussy D'Ambois; Monsieur; Montsurry; Guise; King Henry; Tamyra; Comolet; Behemoth; Cartophylax; Beaupre; Annable; Pero; Dutchesse
- Original language: English
- Subject: French history
- Genre: Tragedy
- Setting: France

Premiere
- Date premiered: 1603–1604
- Place premiered: London

Bussy D'Ambois: A Tragedie (probably written 1603–1604; first published 1607) is a Jacobean stage play written by George Chapman. Classified as either a tragedy or "contemporary history," Bussy D'Ambois is widely considered Chapman's greatest play, and is the earliest in a series of plays that Chapman wrote about the French political scene in his era, including the sequel The Revenge of Bussy D'Ambois, the two-part The Conspiracy and Tragedy of Charles, Duke of Byron, and The Tragedy of Chabot, Admiral of France.

The play is based on the life of the real Louis de Bussy d'Amboise, who was murdered in 1579.

== Historical performance and publication ==
Bussy D'Ambois was probably written in 1603–4, and was performed soon after by the Children of Paul's. The play was entered into the Stationers' Register on 3 June 1607, and published in quarto the same year by the bookseller William Aspley, who issued a second quarto the next year. A revised version of the text was printed in 1641 by the stationer Robert Lunne, with the claim that this text was "much corrected and amended by the author before his death." Scholars have disputed the truth of this claim, though the weight of argument seems to fall in its favor. There are 228 variants between the two versions, "including thirty long alterations and additions and five excisions; their extent and tone show a concern only an author could feel." Some commentators have argued that Chapman revised the original Bussy when writing its sequel, The Revenge of Bussy D'Ambois, c. 1610, to make the two works flow together more smoothly. Robert Lunne issued a fourth quarto in 1647; fifth quarto was published by Joshua Kirton in 1657.

The King's Men acted the play at Court twice in the 1630s, on 7 April 1634 and 27 March 1638, with Eliard Swanston in the title role. The prelude to the 1641 edition also indicates that Nathan Field played Bussy; Field may have brought the play to the King's Men when he joined in 1616. Apparently, Joseph Taylor inherited the role after Field's death (1620), and when he was too "grey" to play a young firebrand passed it to Swanston.

Bussy was revived early in the Restoration era; it was performed at the Red Bull Theatre in 1660, and often thereafter. Charles Hart was noted for the title role. Thomas d'Urfey adapted the play into a version called Bussy D'Ambois, or The Husband's Revenge (1691).

== Modern performances ==
The first modern production of Bussy D'Ambois was at The Old Vic (London) in 1988, with David Threlfall in the title role and Jonathan Miller directing. The second was performed in 2013 at Chapman's burial place, St Giles in the Fields, by the Owle Schreame theatre company directed by Brice Stratford, who also played the title role.

== Sources ==
Along with historical sources on the life of Louis de Bussy d'Amboise, Chapman, like Ben Jonson, makes rich use of classical allusions. Bussy features translated passages from the plays Agamemnon and Hercules Oetaeus of Seneca, plus the Moralia of Plutarch, the Aeneid and Georgics of Virgil, and the Adagia of Erasmus. The characters in the play quote or refer to the Iliad and to works by Empedocles, Themistocles, and Camillus.

== Synopsis ==
As the play opens, the aristocratic but impoverished Bussy, an unemployed soldier and an accomplished swordsman, is reflecting on the corrupt, avaricious, and violent society in which he lives. In the third line of his opening soliloquy, he expresses the radical view that "Who is not poor, is monstrous." Yet by the end of the scene Bussy has pocketed a thousand pounds to enter the service of Monsieur, the brother of the reigning King Henri III, who wishes to assemble a troupe of loyal henchmen to further his own political ends. From the start, Bussy shows that he is not cut out to be a follower: Monsieur's steward, who brings Bussy the payment, is rewarded for an impertinent attitude with a fist to his face.

Subsequent scenes confirm the impression that Bussy's "cannibal valor" is too wild and uncontrolled to allow him to be a tool for ambitious nobles. He quarrels bloodily with courtiers who mock him; in a triple duel he is the last of the six combatants left standing. Bussy enters into an adulterous affair with Tamyra (Françoise de Maridor), the wife of the powerful Count Mountsurry (Charles of Chambes Count of Montsoreau). Matters grow from bad to worse as Mountsurry tortures his wife on the rack to force her to confess her affair. Tamyra is forced to write a letter (in her own blood) to Bussy, summoning him to an assignation. Tamyra's chaplain, a friar who conveyed messages between the lovers, has died of shock at Tamyra's torture, and Mountsurry assumes his robes to deliver the message. Bussy sees the friar's ghost, and communicates with a conjured spirit that warns him of unfolding disaster; but the disguised Mountsurry arrives with Tamyra's letter. The trap is sprung when Bussy responds; he is gunned down in an ambush.

== Characters ==
- HENRY III, King of France.
- MONSIEUR, his brother.
- THE DUKE OF GUISE.
- MONTSURRY, the Count.
- BUSSY D'AMBOIS.
- BARRISOR, Courtier: enemy of D'AMBOIS.
- L'ANOU, Courtier: enemy of D'AMBOIS.
- PYRHOT, Courtier: enemy of D'AMBOIS.
- BRISAC, Courtier: friend of D'AMBOIS.
- MELYNELL, Courtier: friend of D'AMBOIS.
- COMOLET, a Friar.
- MAFFE, steward to MONSIEUR.
- NUNCIUS.
- MURDERERS.
- BEHEMOTH, Devil.
- CARTOPHYLAX, Spirit.
- UMBRA OF FRIAR.
- ELENOR, Duchess of Guise.
- TAMYRA, Countess of Montsurry.
- BEAUPRE, niece to ELENOR.
- ANNABLE, maid to ELENOR.
- PERO, maid to TAMYRA.
- CHARLOTTE, maid to BEAUPRE.
- PYRA, a court lady.
- Courtiers, Ladies, Pages, Servants, Spirits, &c.

== Critical response ==
As Chapman's arguable masterpiece, Bussy D'Ambois has attracted a large body of critical commentary, discussion, and dispute. Scholars have debated Chapman's philosophical and dramaturgical intentions in the play, and whether and to what degree those intentions are successfully realized. Though no true consensus has been reached, many commentators regard Bussy as Chapman's idea of a moral hero at war with his own lower tendencies, wrapped in a conflict between his idealistic urges and the sheer power of his personality – a Marlovian hero with more conscience than Marlowe ever gave his own protagonists.

Or at least, that appears to have been Chapman's intent. Critics have complained at how the moralizing protagonist of the opening scene becomes the ruthless passion-driven anti-hero of the rest of the play. Some have argued that in Bussy D'Ambois Chapman sacrificed logical and philosophical consistency for dramaturgical efficacy, for "force and vehemence of imagination" (to quote Algernon Charles Swinburne). His succeeding French histories are more consistent intellectually, but also far more dull.
