= Thomas Marc Parrott =

19th/20th-century American literary scholar

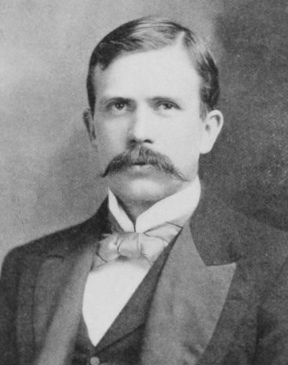
- c. 1899
- Born: December 22, 1866; Dayton, Ohio, US
- Died: February 5, 1960 (aged 93); Neshanic, New Jersey, US
- Education: College of New Jersey; University of Leipzig
- Occupation: Literary scholar
- Employers: Miami University; Princeton University
- Spouse: Mary Adamson (m. 1895; died 1957)

Thomas Marc Parrott (1866–1960) was a prominent American literary scholar, long a member of the faculty of Princeton University in New Jersey.

== Life and work ==
T. M. Parrott was born in Dayton, Ohio, the son of Col. Edwin A. Parrott, Civil War veteran, politician (Speaker of the lower house of the Ohio state legislature, 1866–1867), and centenarian. The younger Parrott graduated from the College of New Jersey, later known as Princeton, in 1888, and was head of the preparatory department of Miami University from 1888-1890. At Miami, he was considered part of the "dude faculty" of young eastern professors brought to the school upon its reopening after a twelve-year hiatus. He is one of the men credited with bringing football to Miami where intercollegiate play began in 1888 against the University of Cincinnati. He earned his Ph.D. from the University of Leipzig in 1893. His thesis was on the non-dramatic poems of Robert Browning. Parrott became assistant professor of English at Princeton in 1896, and full professor at the same institution in 1902. He remained there for the next three decades.

Parrott wrote and published voluminously on a wide range of subjects in English literature, though his special areas of interest were English Renaissance theatre and Victorian literature; he also published on eighteenth-century figures like Samuel Johnson and Alexander Pope. Parrott wrote many books and journal articles on Shakespeare and other Elizabethans; perhaps his most valuable contribution lies in his work on the canon of George Chapman. Parrott edited the comedies and tragedies of Chapman (1910–1914), an edition that is still valuable a century after it was first published.

He married Mary Adamson in 1895. She died in 1957.

Parrott died at a nursing home in Neshanic, New Jersey on February 5, 1960.

== Selected works ==
- The Greater Victorian Poets (1901)
- The World's Great Woman Novelists (1901)
- English Poems from Chaucer to Kipling, with Augustus White Long (1903)
- Samuel Johnson, Philosopher and Autocrat (1903)
- Studies of a Booklover (1904)
- The Authorship of "Sir Giles Goosecappe" (1906)
- The Date of Chapman's "Bussy D'Ambois" (1908)
- William Shakespeare: A Handbook (1934)
- Shakespearean Comedy (1949)
- Hamlet on the Stage (1953)

== See also ==
- Ursula Parrott
