= English drama =

Dramatic plays in England

Drama has been composed and performed in England for thousands of years, including some of the most well-regarded stage plays of all time.

== Roman era ==
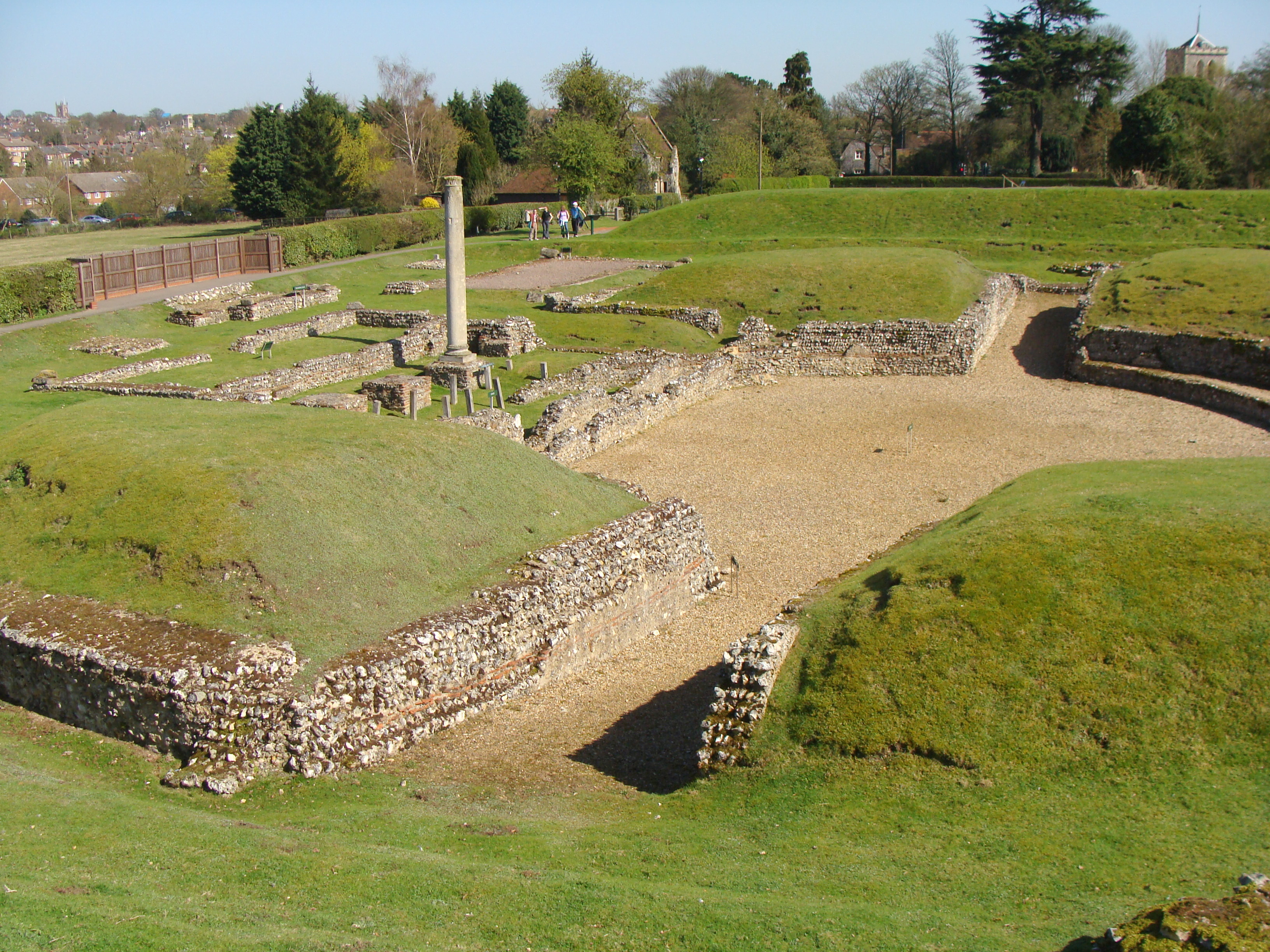
Roman theatre at Verulamium (St Albans)

Drama was introduced to Britain from Europe by the Romans, and auditoriums were constructed across the country for this purpose.

== Medieval period ==
By the medieval period, the mummers' plays had developed, a form of early street theatre associated with the Morris dance, concentrating on themes such as Saint George and the Dragon and Robin Hood. These were folk tales re-telling old stories, and the actors travelled from town to town performing these for their audiences in return for money and hospitality.

=== English mystery plays ===
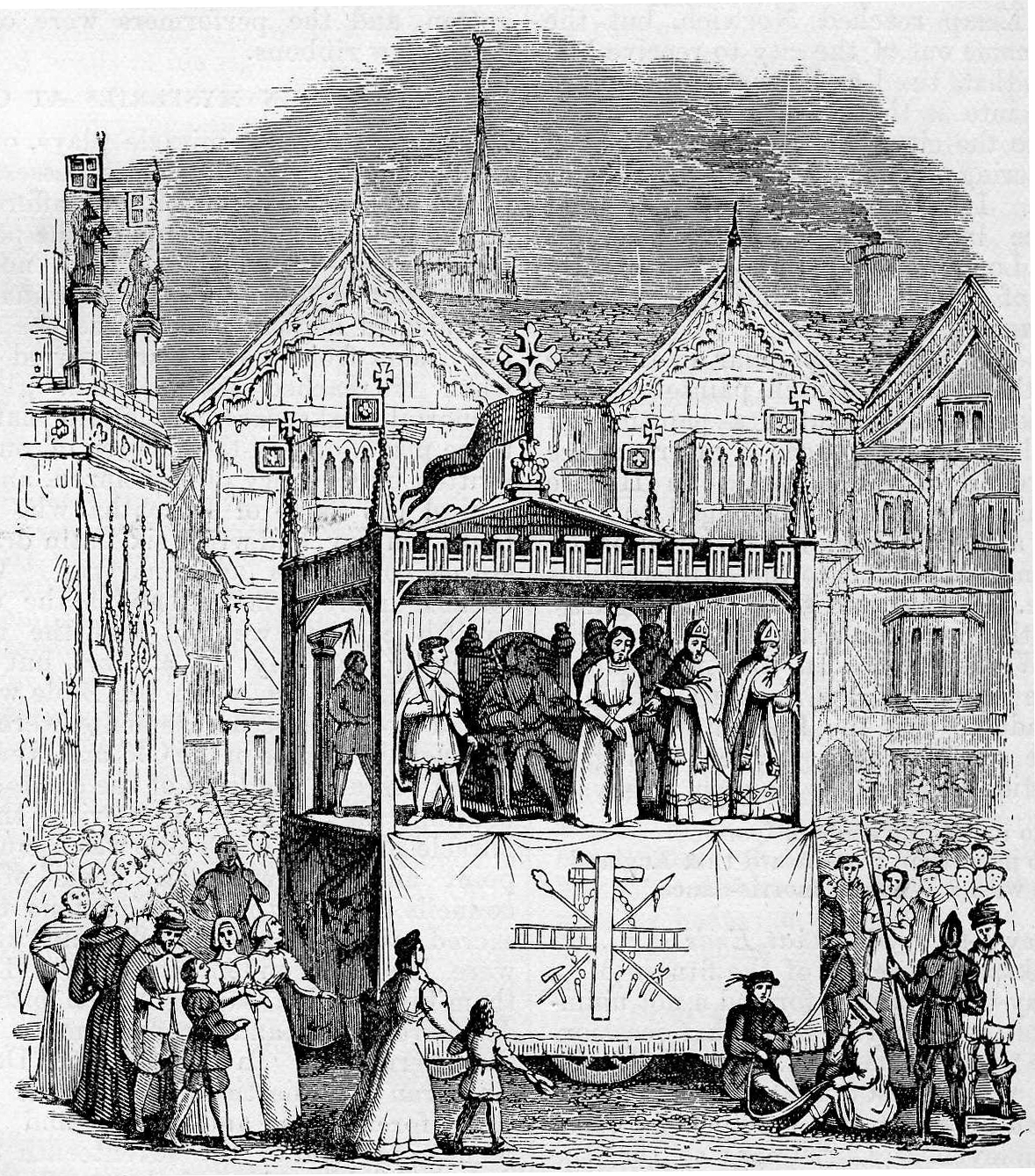
Nineteenth-century engraving of a performance from the Chester mystery play cycle

Mystery plays and miracle plays (sometimes distinguished as two different forms, although the terms are often used interchangeably) are among the earliest formally developed plays in medieval Europe. Medieval mystery plays focused on the representation of Bible stories in churches as tableaux with accompanying antiphonal song. They developed from the 10th to the 16th century, reaching the height of their popularity in the 15th century before being rendered obsolete by the rise of professional theatre. The name derives from mystery used in its sense of miracle, but an occasionally quoted derivation is from misterium, meaning craft, a play performed by the craft guilds.

There are four complete or nearly complete extant English biblical collections of plays from the late medieval period; although these collections are sometimes referred to as "cycles," it is now believed that this term may attribute to these collections more coherence than they in fact possess. The most complete is the York cycle of forty-eight pageants. They were performed in the city of York, from the middle of the fourteenth century until 1569. There are also the Towneley plays of thirty-two pageants, once thought to have been a true 'cycle' of plays and most likely performed around the Feast of Corpus Christi probably in the town of Wakefield, England during the Late Middle Ages until 1576. The Ludus Coventriae (also called the N Town plays or Hegge cycle), now generally agreed to be a redacted compilation of at least three older, unrelated plays, and the Chester cycle of twenty-four pageants, now generally agreed to be an Elizabethan reconstruction of older medieval traditions. Also extant are two pageants from a New Testament cycle acted at Coventry and one pageant each from Norwich and Newcastle upon Tyne. Additionally, a fifteenth-century play of the life of Mary Magdalene, The Brome Abraham and Isaac and a sixteenth-century play of the Conversion of Saint Paul exist, all hailing from East Anglia. Besides the Middle English drama, there are three surviving plays in Cornish known as the Ordinalia.

These biblical plays differ widely in content. Most contain episodes such as the Fall of Lucifer, the Creation and Fall of Man, Cain and Abel, Noah and the Flood, Abraham and Isaac, the Nativity, the Raising of Lazarus, the Passion, and the Resurrection. Other pageants included the story of Moses, the Procession of the Prophets, Christ's Baptism, the Temptation in the Wilderness, and the Assumption and Coronation of the Virgin. In given cycles, the plays came to be sponsored by the newly emerging Medieval craft guilds. The York mercers, for example, sponsored the Doomsday pageant. Other guilds presented scenes appropriate to their trade: the building of the Ark from the carpenters' guild; the five loaves and fishes miracle from the bakers; and the visit of the Magi, with their offerings of gold, frankincense and myrrh, from the goldsmiths. The guild associations are not, however, to be understood as the method of production for all towns. While the Chester pageants are associated with guilds, there is no indication that the N-Town plays are either associated with guilds or performed on pageant wagons. Perhaps the most famous of the mystery plays, at least to modern readers and audiences, are those of Wakefield. Unfortunately, we cannot know whether the plays of the Towneley manuscript are actually the plays performed at Wakefield but a reference in the Second Shepherds' Play to Horbery Shrogys (The Towneley plays line 454) is strongly suggestive

=== Morality plays ===
The morality play is a genre of Medieval and early Tudor theatrical entertainment. In their own time, these plays were known as "interludes", a broader term given to dramas with or without a moral theme. Morality plays are a type of allegory in which the protagonist is met by personifications of various moral attributes who try to prompt him to choose a Godly life over one of evil. The plays were most popular in Europe during the 15th and 16th centuries. Having grown out of the religiously based mystery plays of the Middle Ages, they represented a shift towards a more secular base for European theatre.

The Somonyng of Everyman (The Summoning of Everyman), usually referred to simply as Everyman, is a late 15th-century English morality play. Like John Bunyan's 1678 Christian novel Pilgrim's Progress, Everyman examines the question of Christian salvation by use of allegorical characters, and what Man must do to attain it. The premise is that the good and evil deeds of one's life will be tallied by God after death, as in a ledger book. The play is the allegorical accounting of the life of Everyman, who represents all mankind. In the course of the action, Everyman tries to convince other characters to accompany him in the hope of improving his account. All the characters are also allegorical, each personifying an abstract idea such as Fellowship, [material] Goods, and Knowledge. The conflict between good and evil is dramatized by the interactions between characters.

== Renaissance: Elizabethan and Jacobean periods ==
William Shakespeare, chief figure of the English Renaissance, is here seen in the Chandos portrait.

The period known as the English Renaissance, approximately 1500–1660, saw a flowering of the drama and all the arts. The two candidates for the earliest comedy in English, Nicholas Udall's Ralph Roister Doister (c. 1552) and the anonymous Gammer Gurton's Needle (c. 1566), belong to the 16th century.

During the reign of Elizabeth I (1558–1603) and then James I (1603–25), in the late 16th and early 17th century, a London-centred culture, that was both courtly and popular, produced great poetry and drama. The English playwrights were intrigued by Italian model: a conspicuous community of Italian actors had settled in London. The linguist and lexicographer John Florio (1553–1625), whose father was Italian, was a royal language tutor at the Court of James I, and a possible friend of and influence on William Shakespeare, had brought much of the Italian language and culture to England. He was also the translator of Montaigne into English. The earliest Elizabethan plays include Gorboduc (1561) by Sackville and Norton and Thomas Kyd's (1558–94) revenge tragedy The Spanish Tragedy (1592), that influenced Shakespeare's Hamlet.

William Shakespeare stands out in this period as a poet and playwright as yet unsurpassed. Shakespeare was not a man of letters by profession and probably had only some grammar school education. He was neither a lawyer nor an aristocrat like the "university wits" that had monopolised the English stage when he started writing. But he was very gifted and incredibly versatile, and he surpassed "professionals" like Robert Greene, who mocked this "shake-scene" of low origins. He was himself an actor and deeply involved in the running of the theatre company that performed his plays. Most playwrights at this time tended to specialise in either histories, comedies, or tragedies, but Shakespeare is remarkable in that he produced all three types. His 38 plays include tragedies, comedies, and histories. In addition, he wrote his so-called "problem plays", or "bitter comedies", that include, amongst others, Measure for Measure, Troilus and Cressida, A Winter's Tale and All's Well that Ends Well.

His early classical and Italianate comedies, like A Comedy of Errors, containing tight double plots and precise comic sequences, gave way in the mid-1590s to the romantic atmosphere of his greatest comedies, A Midsummer Night's Dream, Much Ado About Nothing, As You Like It, and Twelfth Night. After the lyrical Richard II, written almost entirely in verse, Shakespeare introduced prose comedy into the histories of the late 1590s, Henry IV, parts 1 and 2, and Henry V. This period begins and ends with two tragedies: Romeo and Juliet and Julius Caesar, based on Sir Thomas North's 1579 translation of Plutarch's Parallel Lives, which introduced a new kind of drama.

Though most of his plays met with success, it was in his later years that Shakespeare wrote what have been considered his greatest plays: Hamlet, Othello, King Lear, Macbeth, Antony and Cleopatra. In his final period, Shakespeare turned to romance or tragicomedy and completed three more major plays: Cymbeline, The Winter's Tale and The Tempest, as well as the collaboration Pericles, Prince of Tyre. Less bleak than the tragedies, these four plays are graver in tone than the comedies of the 1590s, but they end with reconciliation and the forgiveness of potentially tragic errors. Shakespeare collaborated on two further surviving plays, Henry VIII and The Two Noble Kinsmen, probably with John Fletcher.

Other important figures in Elizabethan theatre include Christopher Marlowe (1564–1593), Thomas Dekker (c. 1572 – 1632), John Fletcher (1579–1625), Francis Beaumont (1584–1616), Ben Jonson (c. 1572 – 1637), and John Webster (c. 1578 – c. 1632). Marlowe (1564–1593) was born only a few weeks before Shakespeare and must have known him. Marlowe's subject matter is different from Shakespeare's as it focuses more on the moral drama of the renaissance man than any other thing. Marlowe was fascinated and terrified by the new frontiers opened by modern science. Drawing on German lore, he introduced the story of Faust to England in his play Doctor Faustus (c. 1592), a scientist and magician obsessed by the thirst for knowledge and the desire to push man's technological power to its limits. At the end of a 24-year covenant with the devil, Faust must surrender his soul to him. Beaumont and Fletcher are less known, but they may have helped Shakespeare write some of his best dramas, and were popular at the time. One of Beaumont and Fletcher's chief merits was that of realising how feudalism and chivalry had turned into snobbery and make-believe and that new social classes were on the rise. Beaumont's comedy The Knight of the Burning Pestle (1607) satirises the rising middle class and especially the nouveaux riches who pretend to dictate literary taste without knowing much literature at all.

Ben Jonson (1572/3-1637) is best known for his satirical plays, particularly Volpone, The Alchemist, and Bartholomew Fair. He was also often engaged to write courtly masques, ornate plays where the actors wore masks. Ben Jonson's aesthetics have roots in the Middle Ages as his characters are based on the theory of humours. However, the stock types of Latin literature were an equal influence. Jonson therefore tends to create types or caricatures. However, in his best work, characters are "so vitally rendered as to take on a being that transcends the type". He is a master of style, and a brilliant satirist. Jonson's famous comedy Volpone (1605 or 1606) shows how a group of scammers are fooled by a top con-artist, vice being punished by vice, virtue meting out its reward. Others who followed Jonson's style include Beaumont and Fletcher, whose comedy, The Knight of the Burning Pestle (c. 1607–08), satirizes the rising middle class and especially of those nouveaux riches who pretend to dictate literary taste without knowing much about literature at all. In the story, a grocer and his wife wrangle with the professional actors to have their illiterate son play a leading role in the play.

A popular style of theatre during Jacobean times was the revenge play, which had been popularised earlier in the Elizabethan era by Thomas Kyd (1558–94), and then subsequently developed by John Webster (1578–1632) in the 17th century. Webster's major plays, The White Devil (c. 1609 – 1612) and The Duchess of Malfi (c. 1612/13), are macabre, disturbing works. Webster has received a reputation for being the Elizabethan and Jacobean dramatist with the most unsparingly dark vision of human nature. Webster's tragedies present a horrific vision of mankind; in his poem "Whispers of Immortality," T. S. Eliot memorably says that Webster always "saw the skull beneath the skin". While Webster's drama was generally dismissed in the eighteenth and nineteenth centuries, there has been "a strong revival of interest" in the 20th century.

Other revenge tragedies include The Changeling, written by Thomas Middleton and William Rowley; The Atheist's Tragedy by Cyril Tourneur, first published in 1611; Christopher Marlowe's The Jew of Malta; The Revenge of Bussy D'Ambois by George Chapman; The Malcontent (c. 1603) of John Marston; and John Ford's 'Tis Pity She's a Whore. Besides Hamlet, other plays of Shakespeare's with at least some revenge elements are Titus Andronicus, Julius Caesar, and Macbeth.

George Chapman (?1559-?1634) was a successful playwright who produced comedies (his collaboration on Eastward Hoe led to his brief imprisonment in 1605 as it offended the King with its anti-Scottish sentiment), tragedies (most notably Bussy D'Ambois) and court masques (The Memorable Masque of the Middle Temple and Lincoln's Inn), but who is now remembered chiefly for his translation in 1616 of Homer's Iliad and Odyssey.

The Tragedy of Mariam, the Fair Queen of Jewry, a closet drama written by Elizabeth Tanfield Cary (1585–1639) and first published in 1613, was the first original play in English known to have been written by a woman.

== 17th and 18th centuries ==
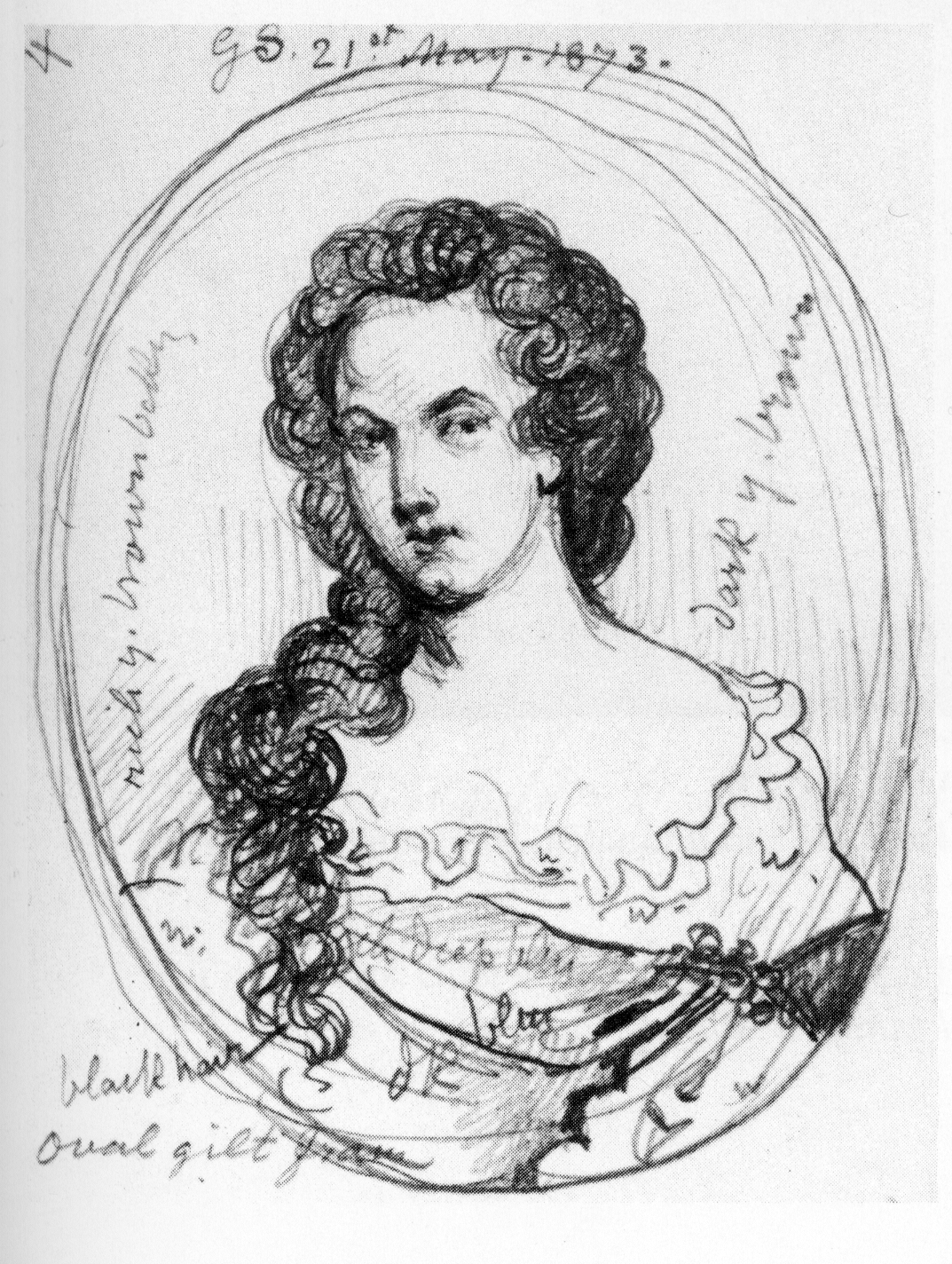
Aphra Behn was the first professional English woman playwright.

During the Interregnum 1649–1660, English theatres were kept closed by the Puritans for religious and ideological reasons. When the London theatres opened again with the Restoration of the monarchy in 1660, they flourished under the personal interest and support of Charles II. Wide and socially mixed audiences were attracted by topical writing and by the introduction of the first professional actresses (in Shakespeare's time, all female roles had been played by boys). New genres of the Restoration were heroic drama, pathetic drama, and Restoration comedy. Notable heroic tragedies of this period include John Dryden's All for Love (1677) and Aureng-zebe (1675), and Thomas Otway's Venice Preserved (1682). The Restoration plays that have best retained the interest of producers and audiences today are the comedies, such as George Etherege's The Man of Mode (1676), William Wycherley's The Country Wife (1676), John Vanbrugh's The Relapse (1696), and William Congreve's The Way of the World (1700). This period saw the first professional woman playwright, Aphra Behn, author of many comedies including The Rover (1677). Restoration comedy is famous or notorious for its sexual explicitness, a quality encouraged by Charles II (1660–1685) personally and by the rakish aristocratic ethos of his court.

In the 18th century, the highbrow and provocative Restoration comedy lost favour, to be replaced by sentimental comedy, domestic tragedy such as George Lillo's The London Merchant (1731), and by an overwhelming interest in Italian opera. Popular entertainment became more dominant in this period than ever before. Fair-booth burlesque and musical entertainment, the ancestors of the English music hall, flourished at the expense of legitimate English drama. By the early 19th century, few English dramas were being written, except for closet drama, plays intended to be presented privately rather than on stage.

== Victorian era ==
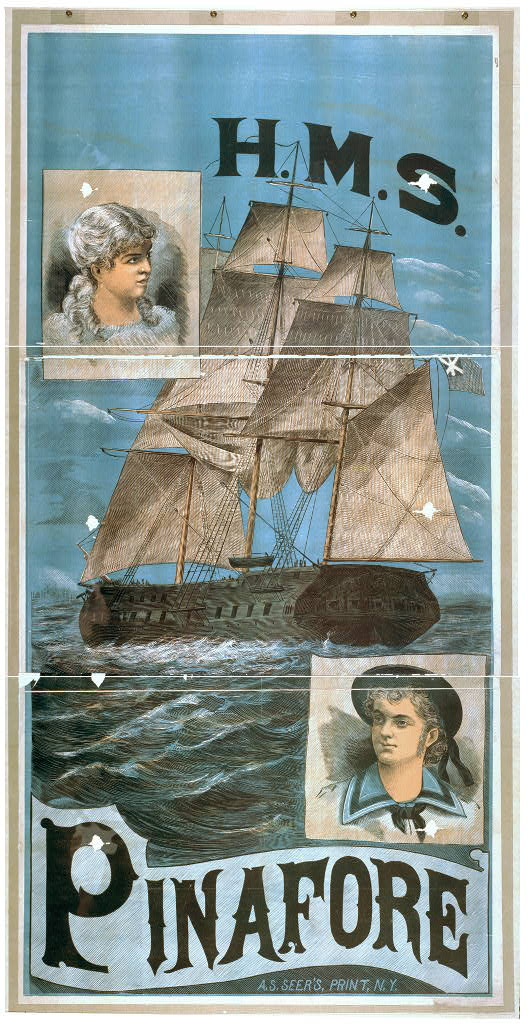

A change came in the Victorian era with a profusion on the London stage of farces, musical burlesques, extravaganzas and comic operas that competed with Shakespeare productions and serious drama by the likes of James Planché and Thomas William Robertson. In 1855, the German Reed Entertainments began a process of elevating the level of (formerly risqué) musical theatre in Britain that culminated in the famous series of comic operas by Gilbert and Sullivan and were followed by the 1890s with the first Edwardian musical comedies. W. S. Gilbert and Oscar Wilde were leading poets and dramatists of the late Victorian period. Wilde's plays, in particular, stand apart from the many now forgotten plays of Victorian times and have a much closer relationship to those of the Edwardian dramatists such as Irishman George Bernard Shaw and Norwegian Henrik Ibsen.

The length of runs in the theatre changed rapidly during the Victorian period. As transportation improved, poverty in London diminished, and street lighting made for safer travel at night, the number of potential patrons for the growing number of theatres increased enormously. Plays could run longer and still draw in the audiences, leading to better profits and improved production values. The first play to achieve 500 consecutive performances was the London comedy Our Boys, opening in 1875. Its astonishing new record of 1,362 performances was bested in 1892 by Charley's Aunt. Several of Gilbert and Sullivan's comic operas broke the 500-performance barrier, beginning with H.M.S. Pinafore in 1878, and Alfred Cellier and B. C. Stephenson's 1886 hit, Dorothy, ran for 931 performances.

== The theatre: 1901–45 ==
Edwardian musical comedy held the London stage (not together with foreign operetta imports) until World War I and was then supplanted by increasingly popular American musical theatre and comedies by Noël Coward, Ivor Novello and their contemporaries. The motion picture mounted a challenge to the stage. At first, films were silent and presented only a limited challenge to theatre. But by the end of the 1920s, films like The Jazz Singer could be presented with synchronized sound, and critics wondered if the cinema would replace live theatre altogether. Some dramatists wrote for the new medium, but playwriting continued.

Irish playwrights George Bernard Shaw (1856–1950) and J. M. Synge (1871–1909) were influential in British drama. Shaw's career began in the last decade of the nineteenth-century and he wrote more than 60 plays. Synge's plays belong to the first decade of the twentieth century. Synge's most famous play, The Playboy of the Western World, "caused outrage and riots when it was first performed" in Dublin in 1907. George Bernard Shaw turned the Edwardian theatre into an arena for debate about important political and social issues, like marriage, class, "the morality of armaments and war" and the rights of women. In the 1920s and later Noël Coward (1899–1973) achieved enduring success as a playwright, publishing more than 50 plays from his teens onwards. Many of his works, such as Hay Fever (1925), Private Lives (1930), Design for Living (1932), Present Laughter (1942) and Blithe Spirit (1941), have remained in the regular theatre repertoire. In the 1930s W. H. Auden and Christopher Isherwood co-authored verse dramas, of which The Ascent of F6 (1936) is the most notable, that owed much to Bertolt Brecht. T. S. Eliot had begun this attempt to revive poetic drama with Sweeney Agonistes in 1932, and this was followed by The Rock (1934), Murder in the Cathedral (1935) and The Family Reunion (1939). There were three further plays after the war.

== The period 1945–2000 ==
An important cultural movement in the British theatre which developed in the late 1950s and early 1960s was Kitchen sink realism (or "kitchen sink drama"), a term coined to describe art (the term itself derives from an expressionist painting by John Bratby), novels, film and television plays. The term angry young men was often applied to members of this artistic movement. It used a style of social realism which depicts the domestic lives of the working class, to explore social issues and political issues. The drawing room plays of the post-war period, typical of dramatists like Terence Rattigan and Noël Coward were challenged in the 1950s by these Angry Young Men, in plays like John Osborne's Look Back in Anger (1956). Arnold Wesker and Nell Dunn also brought social concerns to the stage.

Again In the 1950s, the absurdist play Waiting for Godot by the French resident Irishman Samuel Beckett profoundly affected British drama. The Theatre of the Absurd influenced Harold Pinter (The Birthday Party, 1958), whose works are often characterised by menace or claustrophobia. Beckett also influenced Tom Stoppard (Rosencrantz and Guildenstern are Dead, 1966). Stoppard's works are, however, also notable for their high-spirited wit and the great range of intellectual issues which he tackles in different plays. Both Pinter and Stoppard continued to have new plays produced into the 1990s. Michael Frayn is among other playwrights noted for their use of language and ideas. He is also a novelist.

Other Important playwrights whose careers began later in the century are: Caryl Churchill (Top Girls, 1982) and Alan Ayckbourn (Absurd Person Singular, 1972).

An important new element in the world of British drama, from the beginnings of radio in the 1920s, was the commissioning of plays, or the adaption of existing plays, by BBC radio. This was especially important in the 1950s and 1960s (and from the 1960s on for television). Many major British playwrights in fact, either effectively began their careers with the BBC, or had works adapted for radio. Most of playwright Caryl Churchill's early experiences with professional drama production were as a radio playwright and, starting in 1962 with The Ants, there were nine productions with BBC radio drama up until 1973 when her stage work began to be recognised at the Royal Court Theatre. Joe Orton's dramatic debut in 1963 was the radio play The Ruffian on the Stair, which was broadcast on 31 August 1964. Tom Stoppard's "first professional production was in the fifteen-minute Just Before Midnight programme on BBC Radio, which showcased new dramatists". John Mortimer made his radio debut as a dramatist in 1955, with his adaptation of his own novel Like Men Betrayed for the BBC Light Programme. But he made his debut as an original playwright with The Dock Brief, starring Michael Hordern as a hapless barrister, first broadcast in 1957 on BBC Radio's Third Programme, later televised with the same cast, and subsequently presented in a double bill with What Shall We Tell Caroline? at the Lyric Hammersmith in April 1958, before transferring to the Garrick Theatre. Mortimer is most famous for Rumpole of the Bailey a British television series which starred Leo McKern as Horace Rumpole, an aging London barrister who defends any and all clients. It has been spun off into a series of short stories, novels, and radio programmes.

Other notable radio dramatists included Brendan Behan, and novelist Angela Carter. Novelist Susan Hill also wrote for BBC radio, from the early 1970s. Irish playwright Brendan Behan, author of The Quare Fellow (1954), was commissioned by the BBC to write a radio play The Big House (1956); prior to this he had written two plays Moving Outand A Garden Party for Irish radio.

Among the most famous works created for radio, are Dylan Thomas's Under Milk Wood (1954), Samuel Beckett's All That Fall (1957), Harold Pinter's A Slight Ache (1959) and Robert Bolt's A Man for All Seasons (1954). Samuel Beckett wrote a number of short radio plays in the 1950s and 1960s, and later for television. Beckett's radio play Embers was first broadcast on the BBC Third Programme on 24 June 1959, and won the RAI prize at the Prix Italia awards later that year.

== 21st century ==
Three Girls is a three-part British television's real life drama series, written by screenwriter Nicole Taylor, and directed by Philippa Lowthorpe, that broadcast on three consecutive nights between 16 and 18 May 2017 on BBC One. the series is a dramatised version of the events surrounding the Rochdale child sex abuse ring, the mini series Three Girls attempts to create awareness about how complex criminal process of child grooming takes place while sexually abusing children and describes how the authorities failed to investigate allegations of rape because the victims were perceived as unreliable witnesses. The story is told from the viewpoint of three of the victims: fourteen-year-old Holly Winshaw (Molly Windsor), sixteen-year-old Amber Bowen (Ria Zmitrowicz) and her younger sister Ruby (Liv Hill) According to lawyers Richard Scorer & Nazir Afzal, the drama Three girls helps in building awareness around child protection issues of 21st century. While few critics including whistleblower Sara Rowbotham and few victims appreciated accuracy of depiction; Ben Lawrence in The Telegraph found it to be too timid and not going deep down to investigate & expose root causes surrounding inappropriate behavior of perpetrators of Pakistani descent fully enough.

== See also ==
- English literature
- Irish theatre
- Mummers Play

== Notes ==
=== Works cited ===
- Ackroyd, Peter (2006). Shakespeare: The Biography. London: Vintage. ISBN 978-0-7493-8655-9.
- Dowden, Edward (1881). Shakspere. New York: D. Appleton & Company. OCLC 8164385. OL 6461529M.
- Shapiro, James (2005). 1599: A Year in the Life of William Shakespeare. London: Faber and Faber. ISBN 978-0-571-21480-8.
- Wells, Stanley; Taylor, Gary; Jowett, John; Montgomery, William, eds. (2005). The Oxford Shakespeare: The Complete Works (2nd ed.). Oxford: Oxford University Press. ISBN 978-0-19-926717-0.
