= Revenge play =

Dramatic genre

Title page of the Quarto edition of The Spanish Tragedy (1615)

The revenge tragedy, or revenge play, is a dramatic genre in which the protagonist seeks revenge for an imagined or actual injury. The term revenge tragedy was first introduced in 1900 by A. H. Thorndike to label a class of plays written in the late Elizabethan and early Jacobean eras (circa 1580s to 1620s).

== Origins ==
Most scholars argue that the revenge tragedies of William Shakespeare and his contemporaries stemmed from Roman tragedy, in particular, Seneca's Thyestes. Seneca's tragedies followed three main themes: the inconsistency of fortune (Troades), stories of crime and the evils of murder (Thyestes), and plays in which poverty, chastity and simplicity are celebrated (Hippolytus).

In Thyestes, Seneca portrayed the evil repercussions of murder. In order to exact revenge on his brother Thyestes for adultery with his wife, Atreus lures him to Argos under the pretext of a shared rule, but instead tricks him into eating the cooked flesh of his own children. Seneca's criminals (in this case Thyestes) are always deserving of their punishment unless they repent, since he believed the will to do evil is entirely in the hands of the individual, who must therefore be appropriately punished. This ethical logic becomes complicated, however, since the avenging murder is also a crime, transforming the revenger into a criminal, and thus prompting retribution on behalf of the punished.

While taken from Greek and Roman source material, many early Elizabethan plays with revenge themes had those themes exacerbated by the English translators. That is to say, the original stories were vengeance focused, but when rewritten and staged in England, they had an even greater focus on gruesome revenge.

== Conventions of revenge plays ==
- The ghost of the murdered victim urges revenge (Hamlet, Spanish Tragedy),
- Metatheatricality
- Madness
- Murder
- Cannibalism

== History and development ==
The revenge tragedy was established on the Elizabethan stage with Thomas Kyd's The Spanish Tragedy in 1587. In this play, Hieronimo's discovery of his son Horatio's dead body leads him into a brief fit of madness, after which he discovers the identity of his son's murderers and plans his revenge through a play-within-a-play. It is during this play that he enacts his revenge, after which he kills himself. With Hieronimo's quest for justice in the face of a seemingly powerless state, Spanish Tragedy introduced the thematic issues of retributive justice that would be explored as the genre gained popularity and developed on the Elizabethan and Jacobean stage. The distinction and cultural contention between public and private revenge has been considered by some to be the defining theme of not only early modern revenge tragedy but all early modern tragedy. The tension between public and private revenge, then, has also led to disputes between whether the protagonists enacting private revenge are heroes or villains: is Hieronimo, a character who seeks private revenge to gain retribution for the private murder of his son, a villain or a hero?

Believed to have been staged shortly afterwards, Shakespeare's Titus Andronicus is another early piece of the genre in which the dangerous cycle of revenge through private justice is brought to the fore and the typical features of the genre can be found. In this play, Titus' murder of Tamora's eldest son in a ritual of war leads to the rape and mutilation of his daughter Lavinia. As his revenge, Titus murders Tamora's remaining sons, bakes them into pie, and serves them to her at a feast.

One of the great contentions of the revenge tragedy is the issue of private revenge vs. divine revenge or public (i.e. state sanctioned) revenge. In his essay, "Of Revenge," Francis Bacon writes: "the first wrong, it doth but offend the law; but the revenge of that wrong, putteth the Law out of Office. Certainly, in taking revenge, a man is but even with his Enemy. But in passing it over, he is Superior: For it is a prince's part to Pardon."

As the genre gained popularity, playwrights explored the issue of private vs. public or state justice through the introduction of a variety of revenge characters. In Antonio's Revenge, John Marston creates a character named Pandulpho who embodies an idea from the Spanish Tragedy of the Senecan stoic. The Senecan stoic is not ruled by emotions but rather follows a balance of cosmic determinism and human freedom to avoid misfortune. In Hamlet, Shakespeare explores the complexities of the very human desire for revenge in the face of stoic philosophy and ethics. Throughout the play, Hamlet struggles to avenge his father's murder (as has been demanded of him by his father's ghost), and only does so in the end by mischance.

Other play writers of the period questioned the conventions of the genre through parody reversals of generic expectations. In The Revenger's Tragedy, currently ascribed to Thomas Middleton but formerly thought to be by Cyril Tourneur, the revenge character Vindice is a spiteful man whose pleasure in the act of revenge is what seems to be his true motivation for its fulfillment. The Atheist's Tragedy by Tourneur followed an anti-revenge plot by having Montferrer's ghost explicitly order his son Charlemont not to seek revenge in order to avoid the villainy of violence.

== Reaction ==
Scholars have examined the themes of the revenge tragedy in the context of the Elizabethan and Jacobean period as a way to understand its rapid growth in popularity. For some, the fact that plays openly question the morality of revenge and taking justice into one's own hands is evidence that the public was morally opposed to the concept. For others, however, the popularity of the genre is evidence that the plays expressed the frustrations and desires for justice against oppressive governance of the public.

== In other media ==
Numerous adaptations have been made of revenge plays. Excluding films based on Hamlet, these include:

- Julie Taymor's Titus
- Alex Cox's Revengers Tragedy
- Marcus Thompson's Middleton's Changeling

There are also contemporary films and other media with original stories inspired by the conventions of the genre:

- Peter Greenaway's The Cook, the Thief, His Wife, and Her Lover
- Quentin Tartentino's Kill Bill duology
- Park Chan-wook's Oldboy
- Aleshea Harris' Is God Is, both the original play and film adaptation

The Crying of Lot 49, by Thomas Pynchon, contains a parody of a Jacobean revenge play known as The Courier's Tragedy.

== See also ==
- Grand Guignol
