= Revenge tragedy =

Theatrical genre

Revenge tragedy (sometimes referred to as revenge drama, revenge play, or tragedy of blood) is a theatrical genre in which the principal theme is revenge and revenge's fatal consequences. Formally established by American educator Ashley H. Thorndike in his 1902 article "The Relations of Hamlet to Contemporary Revenge Plays," a revenge tragedy traces the protagonist's revenge plot and often culminates in the deaths of both the murderers and the avenger himself.

The genre first appeared in early modern Britain with the publication of Thomas Kyd's The Spanish Tragedy during the latter half of the 16th century. Earlier works, such as Jasper Heywood's translations of Seneca (1560s) and Thomas Norton and Thomas Sackville's play Gorbuduc (1561), are also considered revenge tragedies. Other well-known revenge tragedies include William Shakespeare's Hamlet (c.1599-1602) and Titus Andronicus (c.1588-1593), and The Revenger's Tragedy (c.1606), formerly believed to be by Cyril Tourneur, now ascribed to Thomas Middleton.

== Key elements of revenge tragedy ==
As established through the precedent of early English playwrights like Thomas Kyd, a good revenge play must include the following:

- A shocking murder has been committed, crying out for revenge.
- Person, or persons, take up the vengeful mission as a sacred duty.
- Ghost of murdered person provides further stimulus for retribution; alternatively there are omens and presentiments.
- Machiavellian villain who, acting on his own behalf or for other causes facilitates a pandemic of blood shed whilst introducing new fangled tortures and horrors.
- Objects of revenge are often better than the avengers.
- Some characters grow mad or feign madness.
- Play within a play that often mimics the core of the main action.
- Use of imagery and language befitting the violence of the events.

== Revenge tragedy as a genre ==
The genre of revenge tragedy developed as a means of explaining early modern tragedies that maintain a theme or motif of revenge in varying degrees. Classification of the revenge tragedy is at times contentious, as with other early modern theatrical genres.

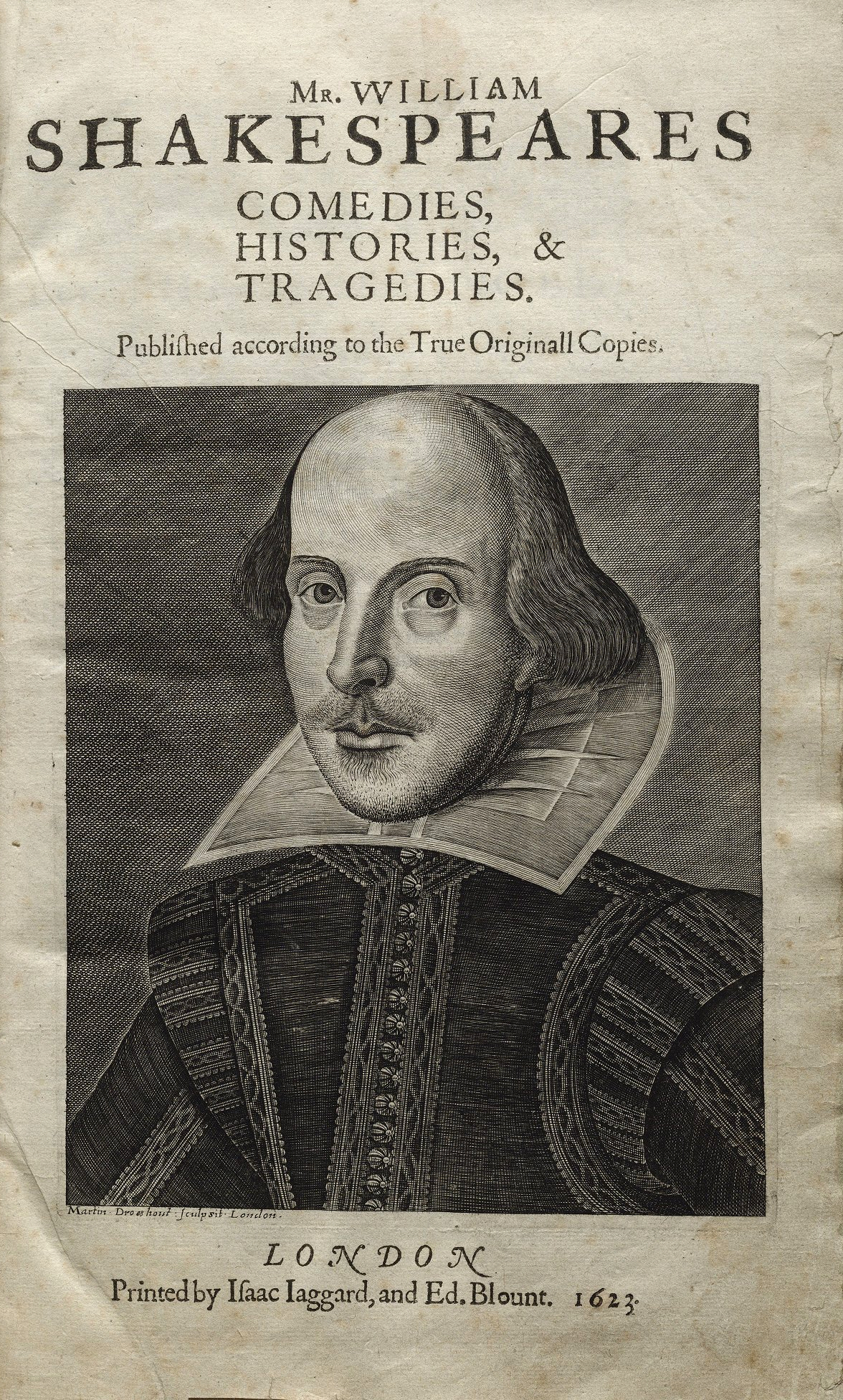
Shakespeare's First Folio

Lawrence Danson suggested that Shakespeare and his contemporaries had a "healthy ability to live comfortably with the unruliness of a theatre where the genre was not static but moving and mixing, always producing new possibilities." On the contrary, Shakespeare's 1623 First Folio famously depicts the printer-imposed (William Jaggard and Edward Blount) three genres of comedy, history, and tragedy, leading readers to falsely believe that plays are easily categorized and contained. While these three genres have remained staples in discussions of genre, other genres are often either invoked or created to accommodate the generic slipperiness of early modern drama. These include not only revenge tragedy, but also city comedy, romance, pastoral, and problem play, among others.

It is common to consider any tragedy containing an element of revenge a revenge tragedy. Lily Campbell argues that revenge is the great thematic uniter of all early modern tragedy, and "Elizabethan tragedy must appear as fundamentally a tragedy of revenge if the extent of the idea of revenge be but grasped". Fredson Bowers's work (1959) on the genre not only widened and complicated what revenge tragedy is, but also increased its function as a productive lens in the work of dramatic interpretation. For example, Titus Andronicus was originally marketed in the First Folio as The Lamentable Tragedy of Titus Andronicus. Hamlet was similarly titled in the First Folio as The Tragedy of Hamlet, Prince of Denmark and The Tragical History of Hamlet, Prince of Denmark in the Second Quarto edition (1604). It's not unusual to find present-day editors classifying these plays as tragedies; however, it is becoming increasingly common to also read and interpret early modern drama with other genres in mind, such as revenge tragedy.

=== Lucius Seneca ===
Lucius Seneca was a prominent playwright of the first century, famous for helping shape the genre of revenge tragedy with his ten plays: Hercules Furens, Troades, Phoenissae, Medea, Phaedra, Oedipus, Agamemnon, Thyestes, Hercules Oetaeus, and Octavia. The importance of his plays lies in the difficulty of the period. While the Elizabethan tragedy was considered more acceptable, revenge tragedy sought to unleash the carnal side of human nature on stage in a much more grotesque way. It was a transitional time in the literary world that would eventually lead to grueling pieces like these. Infamous scenes like the cannibalistic feast in Thyestes introduce the audience to another dimension of the human experience, challenging them to reflect on extreme emotions and dig deeper into the conventions of the genre.

Seneca’s Thyestes, a tale of revenge and horror with prominent cannibalism, can be identified as one of the first "revenge pieces". In the power struggle between two brothers, Atreus and Thyestes, there is a clear theme of revenge. The underlying plot is Thyestes's affair with Atreus' wife. He stole his treasured golden fleece, and sneakily took the throne of Mycenae from him. After a long period of exile, Thyestes is allowed to return to Mycenae. However, the conflict escalates when Atreus executes his revenge by tricking Thyestes into eating his own children. Although overtly grotesque, this piece of literature follows the conventions of the revenge tragedy genre. In Thomas Sackville and Thomas Norton's Gorbudoc (1562) can be found what is considered by many to be an exact representation of Senecan revenge drama in all aspects.

=== Thomas Kyd ===
Thomas Kyd provided a refined form of Senecan tragedy through his play The Spanish Tragedy.

=== William Shakespeare ===
William Shakespeare was an English poet and playwright from the 16th century. Shakespeare's plays Hamlet, Othello and even King Lear may be referred to as revenge tragedies but it is Titus Andronicus that truly embraces this genre. It is a play that contains: fourteen killings (nine on stage), six severed members, one rape, one live burial, one case of insanity, one incidence of cannibalism. In short 5.2 atrocities per act or one for every ninety seven lines. "It is a great play, we're talking 14 dead bodies, kung-fu sword-fu, arrow-fu, dagger-fu, pie-fu, animal screams on the soundtrack, heads roll, hands roll, tongues roll, nine and half quarts of blood and a record breaking ninety four on the vomit scale."

After ten long years of a hard-fought war, the Roman general Titus Andronicus returns triumphant; however, with only four out of his twenty five sons alive. One of the captures he has made is Tamora, Queen of the enemy Goths, and her four sons. In accordance with Roman ritual Titus makes a sacrifice of Tamora's eldest son to honour his dead sons. Tamora wants revenge and sets out to get it.

She begins her vendetta by seducing and then marrying the emperor whilst scheming with her lover to have two of Titus' sons framed for the murder of the emperor's brother. The plan is successful and the two sons are beheaded. Titus' remaining son is banished when he tries to intercede on behalf of his sister to allow her to marry the person she loves and not her betrothed. Tamora convinces her two sons to avenge their brother's death by raping Titus' daughter Lavinia. After the rape, they cut off her hands and tongue so she cannot tell anyone about what has happened. With each tragedy, Titus sinks lower and lower and begins to act strangely and is assumed to be crazy from grief. Having feigned madness, Titus tricks Tamora by inviting her and the emperor for dinner. Unbeknownst to them Titus has captured and killed Tamora's two sons and has made them into a pie. This he feeds to the two before killing both Tamora and Lavinia. A veritable massacre ensues leaving only a handful of characters live. Having returned from banishment and assuming the mantle of the emperor, Titus' son has the solo living progeny of Tamora buried alive and Tamora's corpse thrown to the wolves.

=== Other examples ===
Elizabethan and Jacobean writers employed as many of these features as their plots allowed and freely made variations in them. Revenge tragedy caught their imagination and writers attempted plays of this genre with their own variations of dramaturgy. Shakespeare raised his revenge tragedy to a high intellectual and philosophical level by making Hamlet a virtuous, sensitive scholar. Cyril Tourneur exploited the morbid and melodramatic in The Atheist's Tragedy. John Webster reversed the moral position of avengers and victims. In The White Devil and The Duchess of Malfi the victims of the so called revenge are heroic women and the avengers blood thirsty villains. In The Duchess of Malfi the main characters plot to kill their widowed sister who secretly marries without their consent.

Christopher Crosbie's book explores the connection between early modern revenge tragedies and the underlying philosophical influences, aiming to unveil how these plays addressed ontological questions rooted in classical philosophy. He delves into specific works, such as Thomas Kyd’s The Spanish Tragedy, Shakespeare’s Titus Andronicus, Hamlet, John Marston's Antonio's Revenge, and John Webster's The Duchess of Malfi, highlighting the philosophical elements woven into the fabric of these dramas. Crosbie's in-depth analysis reveals how concepts from Aristotle, Galen, Lucretius, and Stoicism are interwoven into the plays, shedding new light on the philosophical underpinnings of early modern revenge tragedies.

Other examples of revenge tragedies include The Jew of Malta (1589, Christopher Marlowe), Antonio’s Revenge (1600, John Marston), and The Revenge of Bussy D’Ambois (1613, George Chapman).

In his essay "Of Revenge", Francis Bacon wrote "This is certain, that a man studieth revenge, keeps his own wounds green, which otherwise would heal and do well."
