= The Crying of Lot 49 =

1966 novel by Thomas Pynchon

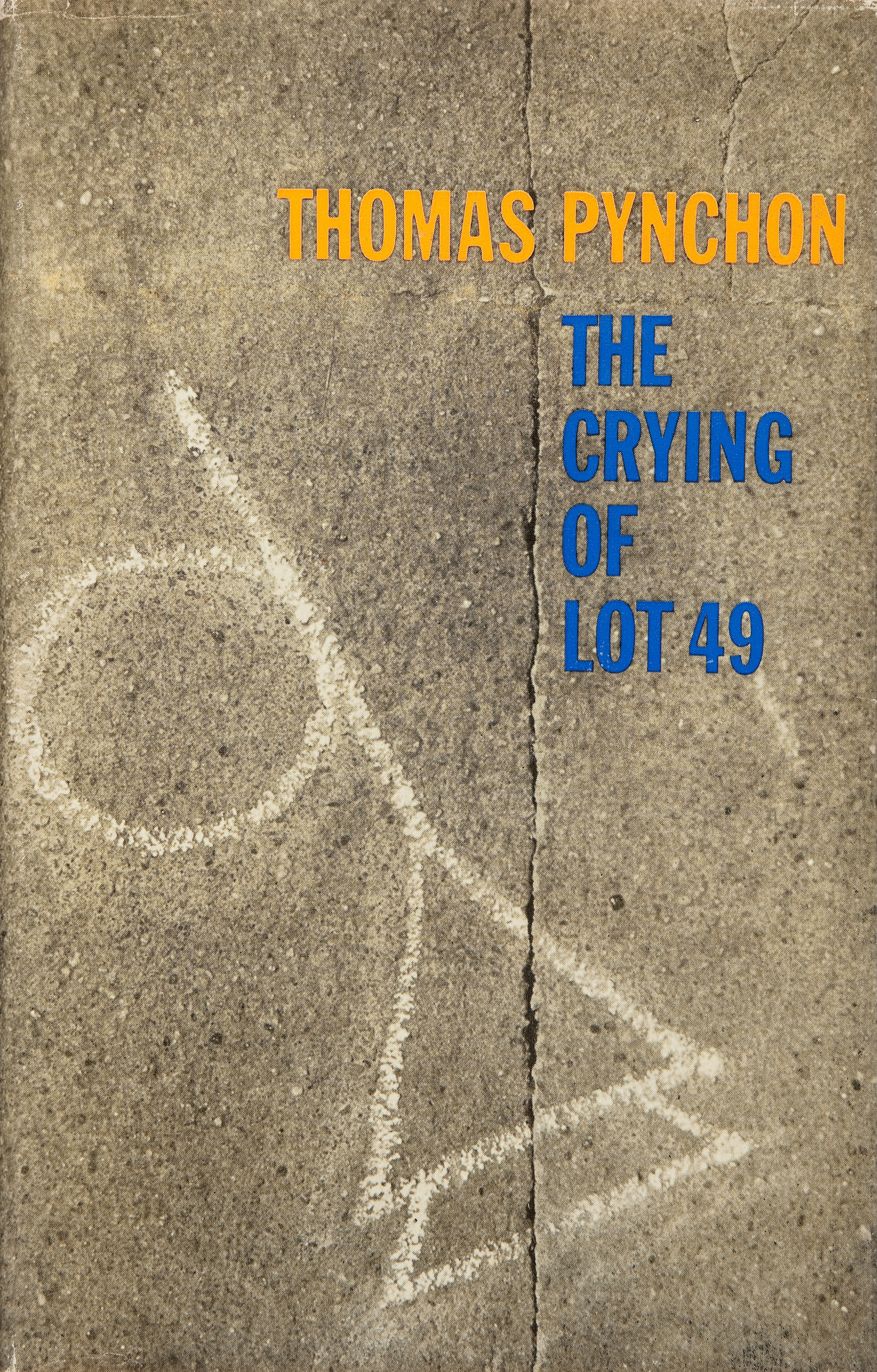
- Cover of first edition
- Author: Thomas Pynchon
- Genre: Postmodern novel, paranoid fiction
- Published: April 27, 1966 (J. B. Lippincott & Co.)
- Publication place: United States
- Pages: 183

The Crying of Lot 49 is a novel by the American author Thomas Pynchon. It was published by J. B. Lippincott & Co. on April 27, 1966. The shortest of Pynchon's novels, the plot follows Oedipa Maas, a young Californian woman who begins to embrace a conspiracy theory as she possibly unearths a centuries-old feud between two mail distribution companies. One of these companies, Thurn and Taxis, actually existed; operating from 1806 to 1867, Thurn and Taxis was the first private firm to distribute postal mail. Like most of Pynchon's writing, The Crying of Lot 49 is often described as postmodernist literature. Time magazine included the book in its list of the 100 best English-language novels from 1923 to 2005.

== Plot ==
In the mid-1960s, Oedipa Maas lives a fairly comfortable life in a northern Californian village, despite her lackluster marriage with Mucho Maas, a rudderless radio jockey and ephebophile, and her sessions with Dr. Hilarius, an unhinged German psychotherapist who tries to medicate his patients with LSD. One day, Oedipa learns of the death of an ex-lover, Pierce Inverarity, a wealthy and powerful real-estate mogul from the Los Angeles area, who has nominated her as the executor of his estate. Oedipa goes to meet Inverarity's lawyer, a former child actor named Metzger, and they begin an affair, which fascinates a local teenage rock band, the Paranoids, who begin following the pair voyeuristically. At a bar, Oedipa notices the graffiti symbol of a muted post horn with the label "W.A.S.T.E." and she chats with Mike Fallopian, a right-wing historian and critic of the postal system, who claims to use a secret postal service.

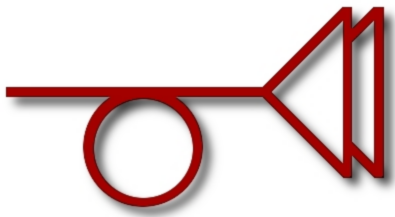
The novel's ubiquitous muted post horn symbol

It emerges that Inverarity had Mafia connections, illicitly attempting to sell the bones of forgotten U.S. World War II soldiers for use as charcoal to a cigarette company. One of the Paranoids' friends mentions that this strongly reminds her of a Jacobean revenge play she recently saw called The Courier's Tragedy. Intrigued by the coincidence, Oedipa and Metzger attend a performance of the play, which briefly mentions the name "Tristero". After the show, Oedipa approaches the play's director and star, Randolph Driblette, who deflects her questions about the mention of the unusual name. After seeing a man scribbling the post horn symbol, Oedipa reconnects with Mike Fallopian, who tells her he suspects a conspiracy. This is supported when watermarks of the muted horn symbol are discovered hidden on Inverarity's private stamp collection. The symbol appears to be a muted variant of the coat of arms of Thurn and Taxis, a 19th-century European postal monopoly that suppressed all opposition, including Trystero (or Tristero), a competing postal service that was defeated but possibly driven underground. Based on the symbolism of the mute, Oedipa thinks that Trystero exists as a countercultural secret society with unknown goals.

She researches an older censored edition of The Courier's Tragedy, which confirms that Driblette indeed made a conscious choice to insert the "Tristero" line. She seeks answers through a machine claimed to have psychic abilities but the experience is awkward and unsuccessful. As she feverishly wanders the Bay Area, the muted post horn symbol appears in many random places. Finally, a nameless man at a gay bar tells her that the symbol simply represents an anonymous support group for people with broken hearts. Oedipa witnesses people referring to and using mailboxes disguised as regular waste bins marked with "W.A.S.T.E." (later suggested to be an acronym for "We Await Silent Tristero's Empire"). Even so, Oedipa sinks into paranoia, wondering if Trystero exists or if she is merely overthinking a series of false connections.

Fearing for her sanity, Oedipa makes an impromptu visit to Dr. Hilarius, only to find him having lost his own mind, firing a gun randomly and raving madly about his days as a Nazi medical intern at Buchenwald. She helps the police subdue him, only to return home to find that her husband Mucho has lost his mind in his own way, having become addicted to LSD. Oedipa consults an English professor about The Courier's Tragedy, learns that Randolph Driblette has mysteriously committed suicide, and is left pondering whether Trystero is simply a prolonged hallucination, a historical plot, or an elaborate practical joke that Inverarity arranged for her before his death. Oedipa goes to an auction of Inverarity's possessions and waits on the bidding of lot 49, which contains the stamp collection with the muted horn symbol. Having learned that a particular bidder is interested in the stamps, she hopes to discover if this person will be a representative of the Trystero secret society.

== Characters ==
- Oedipa Maas – The protagonist. After the death of her ex-boyfriend, the real estate mogul Pierce Inverarity, she is appointed co-executor of his estate and discovers and begins to unravel what may or may not be a world conspiracy.
- Wendell "Mucho" Maas – Oedipa's husband, Mucho once worked in a used-car lot but recently became a disc jockey for KCUF radio in Kinneret, California.
- Metzger – A lawyer who works for Warpe, Wistfull, Kubitschek and McMingus. He has been assigned to help Oedipa execute Pierce's estate. He and Oedipa have an affair.
- Miles, Dean, Serge and Leonard – The four members of the Paranoids, a small-time rock band consisting of marijuana-smoking American teenagers who sing with British accents and have haircuts inspired by the Beatles.
- Dr. Hilarius – Oedipa's psychiatrist, who tries to prescribe LSD to Oedipa as well as to other housewives. Toward the end of the book, he goes crazy and admits to being a former Nazi medical intern at Buchenwald concentration camp, where he worked in a program on experimentally-induced insanity, which he supposed was a more "humane" way of dealing with Jewish prisoners than killing.
- Stanley Koteks – An employee of Yoyodyne Corporation who knows something about the Trystero. Oedipa meets him when she wanders into his office while touring the plant.
- John Nefastis – A scientist obsessed with perpetual motion. He has tried to invent a type of Maxwell's demon to create a perpetual motion machine. Oedipa visits him to see the machine after learning about him from Stanley Koteks; the visit is unproductive and she runs out the door after he propositions her.
- Randolph "Randy" Driblette – Director of The Courier's Tragedy by Jacobean playwright Richard Wharfinger and a leading Wharfinger scholar; he deflects Oedipa's questions and dismisses her theories when she approaches him taking a shower after the show; later, he commits suicide by walking into the Pacific before Oedipa can follow up with him but the initial meeting with him spurs her to go on a quest to find the meaning behind Trystero.
- Mike Fallopian – Oedipa and Metzger meet Fallopian in The Scope, a bar frequented by Yoyodyne employees. He tells them about The Peter Pinguid Society, a right-wing, anti-government organization that he belongs to.
- Genghis Cohen – The most eminent philatelist in the Los Angeles area, Cohen was hired to inventory and appraise Inverarity's stamp collection. Oedipa and he discuss stamps and forgeries and he discovers the horn symbol watermark on Inverarity's stamps.
- Professor Emory Bortz – Formerly of UC Berkeley, now teaching at San Narciso, Bortz wrote the editor's preface in a version of Wharfinger's works. Oedipa tracks him down to learn more about Trystero.

== Critical reception ==
Critics have read the book as both an "exemplary postmodern text" and a parody of postmodernism. Contemporary reviews were mixed, with many critics comparing it unfavourably with Pynchon's first novel V.. A reviewer in Time described the novel as "a metaphysical thriller in the form of a pornographic comic strip". In a positive The New York Times review, Richard Poirier wrote "Pynchon's technical virtuosity, his adaptations of the apocalyptic-satiric modes of Melville, Conrad, and Joyce, of Faulkner, Nathanael West, and Nabokov, the saturnalian inventiveness he shares with contemporaries like John Barth and Joseph Heller, his security with philosophical and psychological concepts, his anthropological intimacy with the off-beat – these evidences of extraordinary talent in the first novel continue to display themselves in the second".

=== Self-reception ===
Pynchon described, in the prologue to his 1984 collection Slow Learner, an "up-and-down shape of my learning curve" as a writer and specifically does not believe he maintained a "positive or professional direction" in the writing of The Crying of Lot 49, "which was marketed as a 'novel', and in which I seem to have forgotten most of what I thought I'd learned up until then".

== Allusions in the book ==
The Crying of Lot 49 book cover, featuring the Thurn und Taxis post horn

=== Maxwell's demon ===
After being prompted to by Stanley Koteks, Oedipa seeks out John Nefastis and his invention coined the 'Nefastis Machine'. This machine attempts to serve as a perpetual motion machine, utilizing the theory of Maxwell's demon to sort molecules within a closed chamber. Nefastis explains that a telepathic operator or 'sensitive' is necessary to work the invention by looking into a photo of James Clerk Maxwell.

Despite Nefastis' attempt at invention, the second law of thermodynamics and its statement regarding entropy cannot be disproven, as the system gains entropy by way of measurement by the demon. This alludes to a famous retort of Maxwell's demon by Szilard and Brillouin which sought to establish congruence between entropy in information theory and thermodynamics. Scholars have pointed to the entropic nature and indeterminacy of the novel as a symbol which invalidates the demon's existence.

Oedipa's role within The Crying of Lot 49 can be likened to Maxwell's demon—a force which seeks to reverse the flow of entropy on the town of San Narciso. Just as the demon is hypothesized to sort unpredictable, random molecules to create order from disorder, Oedipa seeks to make sense of the mystery of Trystero. San Narciso as a city is often described as 'still' or 'silent'; a place where life has stagnated, one cultural microcosm of many within the United States. The concept of Trystero acts as a promise to reverse the entropic regress that America has fallen into, as an 'anarchist miracle'.

=== Oedipus Rex ===
The connection between Oedipus and the protagonist of The Crying of Lot 49, Oedipa Maas, tends to align with one of two interpretations within literature: that of the Sophoclean tragedy Oedipus Rex, and that of the Oedipus Complex, a psychoanalytical theory pioneered by Sigmund Freud. Comparing the novel with Oedipus Rex, some scholars argue that both Oedipus and Oedipa serve as solvers of riddles—Oedipus in answering the Sphinx's riddle and Oedipa in attempting to uncover the mystery behind Trystero. However, critics of this interpretation claim that these riddles share little topical symmetry.

Supporters of the Freudian interpretation tend to point towards Pynchon's heavy borrowing of Greek literature and extensive use of allusions as part of the cyclic, incestuous nature of recycling within literature. Alternatively, the homogeneity of society around San Narciso as a result of the convergence of entropy has also been pointed to as having an incestuous nature.

=== Metamorphoses ===
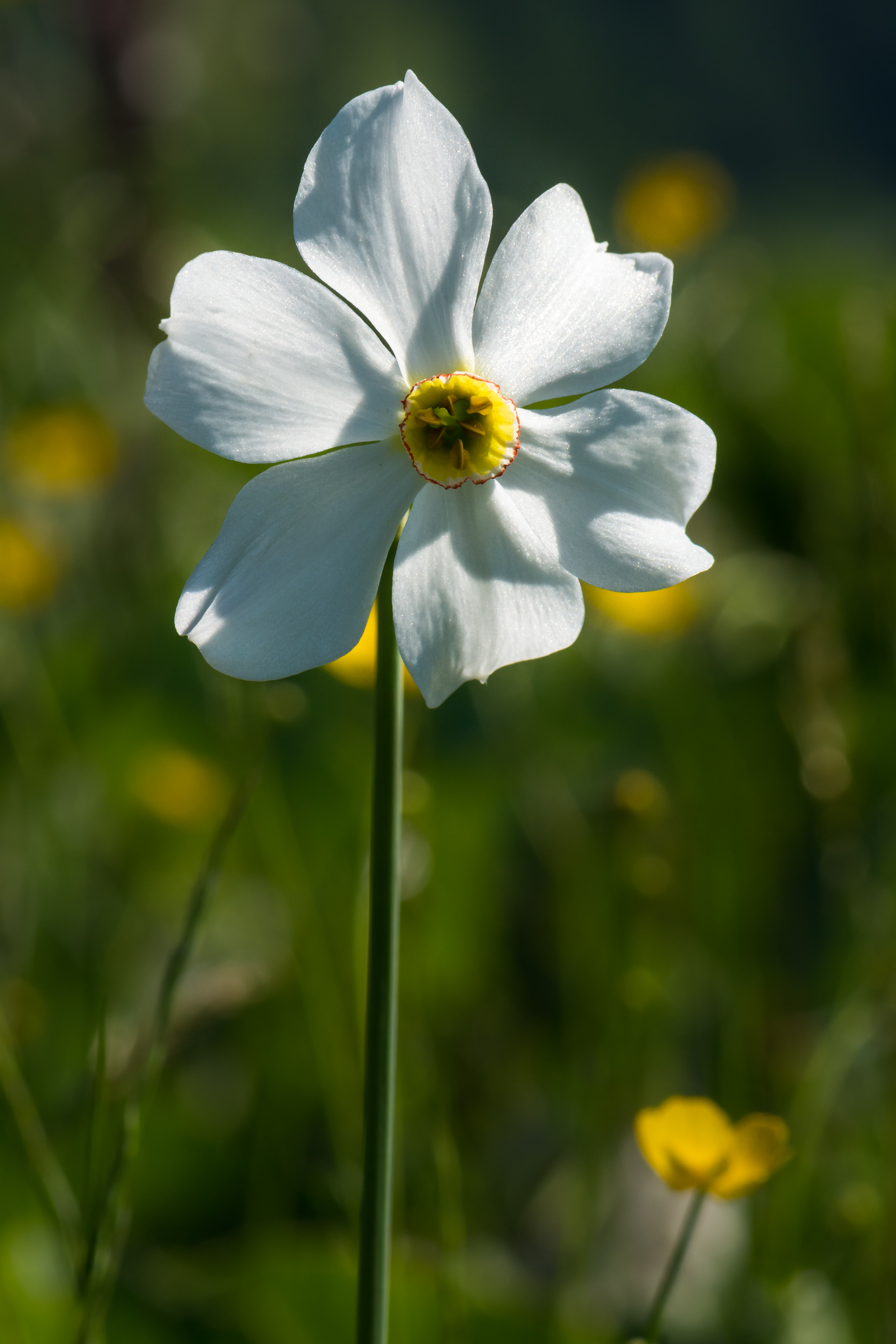
The flower held by the nymph Echo, Narcissus poeticus

Upon arrival in San Narciso, Oedipa stops to check in at the Echo Courts Motel, which sports a painted sheet metal likeness of the nymph Echo from Ovid's Metamorphoses. This figure of Echo is holding a flower, suggested to be Narcissus poeticus, alike to the flower Narcissus turns into within the myth of Echo and Narcissus. Additionally, the pool at Echo Courts Motel is described as flat-surfaced, possibly symbolizing the pool in which Narcissus fell in love with his own reflection.

Scholars have drawn parallels between Oedipa and both Narcissus and Echo. Oedipa is initially suggested to bear a self-proclaimed resemblance to Echo, and it has been suggested the longing for answers regarding Trystero mirrors Echo's desire of Narcissus. Oedipa also recurringly encounters mirrors throughout the novel, initially failing to find herself in the bathroom mirror at Echo Courts, which could point to the beginning of her paranoia. She additionally recounts a dream in which she is making love to her husband at the motel, only to awake to herself staring back at her through a mirror, an act of self-love by way of a mirror, alluding to the fate of Narcissus within Metamorphoses.

=== The Courier's Tragedy ===
Pynchon devotes a significant part of the book to a play-within-a-book, a detailed description of a performance of an imaginary Jacobean revenge play, involving intrigues between Thurn und Taxis and Trystero. Like The Mousetrap, based on The Murder of Gonzago that William Shakespeare placed within Hamlet, the events and atmosphere of The Courier's Tragedy (by the fictional Richard Wharfinger) mirror those transpiring around them. In many aspects it resembles a typical revenge play, such as The Spanish Tragedy by Thomas Kyd, Hamlet by Shakespeare, and plays by John Webster and Cyril Tourneur.

=== The Beatles ===
The Crying of Lot 49 was published shortly after Beatlemania and the British Invasion that took place in the United States and other Western countries. Internal context clues indicate that the novel is set in the summer of 1964, the year in which A Hard Day's Night was released. Pynchon makes a wide variety of Beatles allusions. Most prominent are the Paranoids, a band composed of cheerful marijuana smokers whose lead singer, Miles, is a high-school dropout described as having a "Beatle haircut". The Paranoids all speak with American accents but sing in English ones; at one point, a guitar player is forced to relinquish control of a car to his girlfriend because he cannot see through his hair. It is not clear whether Pynchon was aware of the Beatles' nickname for themselves, "Los Para Noias"; since the novel is replete with other references to paranoia, Pynchon may have chosen the band's name for other reasons.

Pynchon refers to a rock song, "I Want to Kiss Your Feet", an adulteration of "I Want to Hold Your Hand". The song's artist, Sick Dick and the Volkswagens, evokes the names of such historical rock groups as the El Dorados, the Edsels, the Cadillacs and the Jaguars (as well as an early name the Beatles themselves used, "Long John and the Silver Beetles"). "Sick Dick" may also refer to Richard Wharfinger, author of "that ill, ill Jacobean revenge play" known as The Courier's Tragedy. The song's title also keeps up a recurring sequence of allusions to Saint Narcissus, a 3rd-century bishop of Jerusalem.

Late in the novel, Oedipa's husband, Mucho Maas, a disc jockey at Kinneret radio station KCUF, describes his experience of discovering the Beatles. Mucho refers to their early song "She Loves You", as well as hinting at the areas the Beatles were later to explore. Pynchon wrote,

Whenever I put the headset on now," he'd continued, "I really do understand what I find there. When those kids sing about 'She loves you,' yeah well, you know, she does, she's any number of people, all over the world, back through time, different colors, sizes, ages, shapes, distances from death, but she loves. And the 'you' is everybody. And herself. Oedipa, the human voice, you know, it's a flipping miracle." His eyes brimming, reflecting the color of beer. "Baby," she said, helpless, knowing of nothing she could do for this, and afraid for him. He put a little clear plastic bottle on the table between them. She stared at the pills in it, and then understood. "That's LSD?" she said.

=== Vladimir Nabokov ===
Pynchon, like Kurt Vonnegut, was a student at Cornell University, where he probably at least audited Vladimir Nabokov's Literature 312 class. (Nabokov had no recollection of him but Nabokov's wife Véra recalls grading Pynchon's examination papers, thanks only to his handwriting, "half printing, half script".) The year before Pynchon graduated, Nabokov's novel Lolita was published in the United States. Lolita introduced the word "nymphet" to describe a girl between the ages of nine and fourteen, sexually attractive to the hebephilic main character, Humbert Humbert and it was also used in the novel's adaptation to cinema in 1962 by Stanley Kubrick. In the following years, mainstream usage altered the word's meaning to apply to older girls. Perhaps appropriately, Pynchon provides an early example of the modern "nymphet" usage entering the literary canon. Serge, the Paranoids' teenage counter-tenor, loses his girlfriend to a middle-aged lawyer. At one point he expresses his angst in song:

What chance has a lonely surfer boy
For the love of a surfer chick,
With all these Humbert Humbert cats
Coming on so big and sick?
For me, my baby was a woman,
For him she's just another nymphet.

=== Remedios Varo ===
Early in The Crying of Lot 49, Oedipa recalls a trip to an art museum in Mexico with Inverarity, during which she encountered a painting, Bordando el Manto Terrestre ("Embroidering the Earth’s Mantle") by Remedios Varo. The 1961 painting shows eight women inside a tower, where they are presumably held captive. Six maidens are weaving a tapestry that flows out of the windows and seems to constitute the world outside of the tower. Oedipa's reaction to the tapestry gives us some insight into her difficulty in determining what is real and what is a fiction created by Inverarity for her benefit,

She had looked down at her feet and known, then, because of a painting, that what she stood on had only been woven together a couple thousand miles away in her own tower, was only by accident known as Mexico, and so Pierce had taken her away from nothing, there'd been no escape.

== In popular culture ==
- The song "Looking for Lot 49" by The Jazz Butcher alludes to the novel in its title and theme of postal services.
- Radiohead allude to the novel in the name of their online merchandise shop and mailing list, W.A.S.T.E.
- The song "The Crying of Lot G" by Yo La Tengo is an allusion to the novel.
- The song "Radio Zero" by The Poster Children mentions "Radio KCUF" in the lyrics. They also used W.A.S.T.E. and the post-horn on their first cassette.
- In the William Gibson novel Count Zero (1986), the multinational corporation Maas Neotek is named in honor of Oedipa Maas.
- The sample configuration file for GNU's Wget uses proxy.yoyodyne.com as a placeholder for the proxy setting.
- The Phone Company (tpc.int), established by Carl Malamud and Marshall Rose in 1991, used the post horn of the Trystero guild as its logo.
- A Google smartphone app for the third annual Treefort Music Fest (a QR Code scanner in the guise of a nominal secret decoder ring) prominently features the Trystero muted horn.
- The title of the 2018 AMC-TV series Lodge 49 alludes to the novel.
- The public art installation called the San Jose Semaphore, on top of the Adobe World Headquarters in San Jose, contained a riddle between 2006 and 2007 which, when solved, resulted in the text of the novel.
- The anime film Tamala 2010: A Punk Cat in Space (2002) bases part of its plot about a religious cult becoming a mail-order monopoly and intergalactic power on the novel's Tristero.
- In the movie The Adventures of Buckaroo Banzai Across the 8th Dimension (1984), Yoyodyne Propulsion Systems is the name of a supposed defense contractor that is really a front for a group of red Lectroid aliens, all of whom are named John.
- In The O.C. episode "The L.A.", Paris Hilton reveals that she is working on a thesis on Pynchon. Another character responds, saying he has only read "The Crying of Lot 49".
- In the sixth book 'The Ersatz Elevator' of A Series of Unfortunate Events, Lot 49 of the auction featured a collection of rare stamps, referencing Pynchon's novel.
- The title and lyrics of the song "San Narciso" by Faded Paper Figures refer to the fictional city featured in the novel.
- The Star Trek: Deep Space Nine episode "In the Cards" features a Willie Mays baseball card being sold at an auction, where it is listed as Lot 49.
- The Simpsons episode "Diatribe of a Mad Housewife" mirrors parts of the plot of the novel, and features Pynchon portraying himself.
- Namwali Serpell's post-postmodern short story, "Account", written in the style of a credit card or bank account statement, alludes to a car purchased from "MUCHO MAAS USED CARS."

== Publication history ==
- Pynchon, Thomas (December 1965). "The World (This One), The Flesh (Mrs. Oedipa Maas), And The Testament Of Pierce Inverarity". Esquire. pp. 170–173, 296–303. (excerpt)
- Pynchon, Thomas R. The Crying of Lot 49. J. B. Lippincott. Philadelphia. 1966. 1st edition. OCLC 916132946
- Pynchon, Thomas R. The Crying of Lot 49. Harper and Row, 1986, reissued 2006. ISBN 978-0060913076 : Perennial Fiction Library edition.
