= Antonio and Mellida =

Play written by John Marston

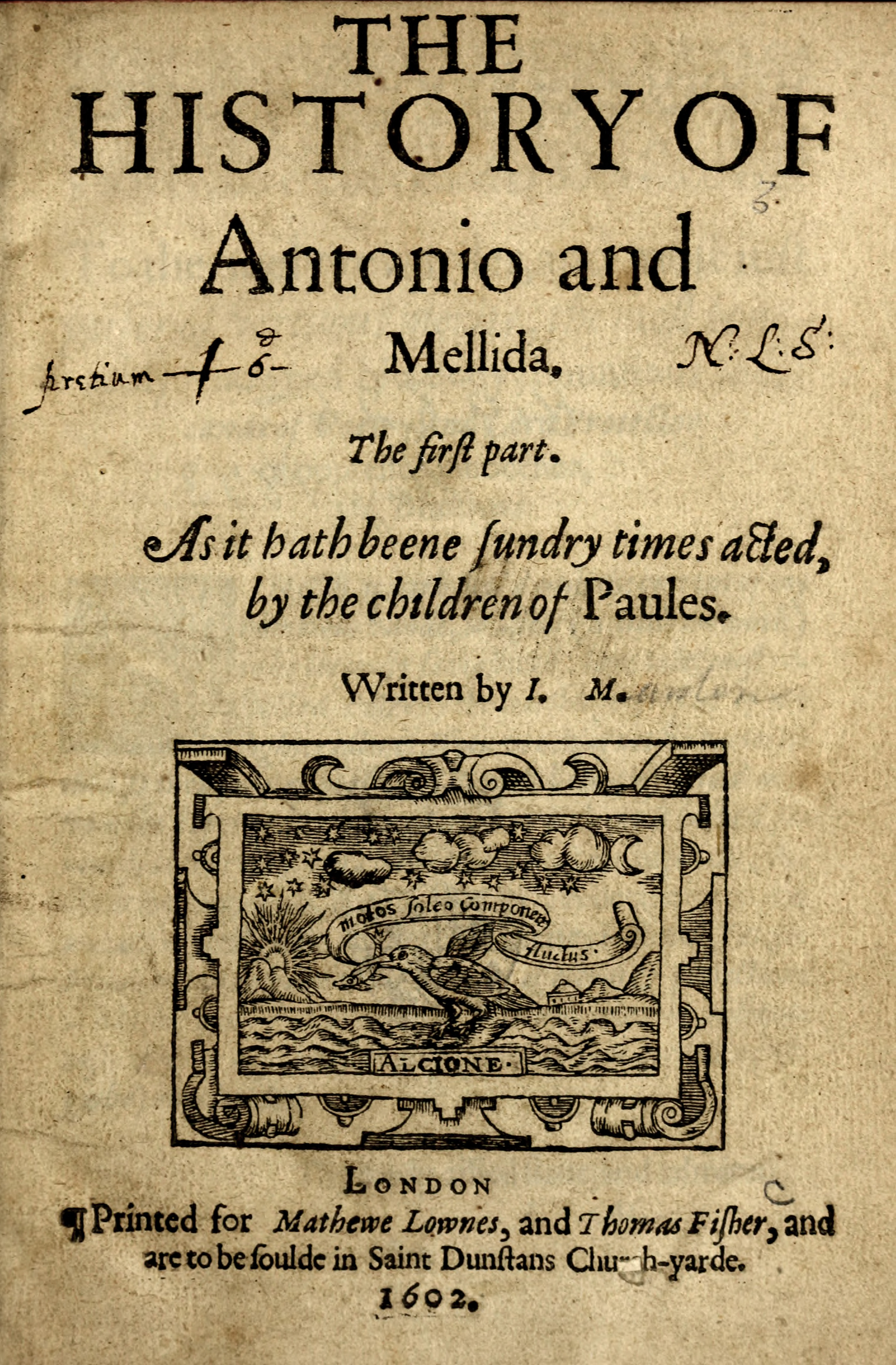
Title page of The History of Antonio and Mellida (1602)

Antonio and Mellida is a late Elizabethan play written by the satirist John Marston, usually dated to c. 1599.

The play was entered into the Stationers' Register on 24 October 1601, and first published in quarto in 1602 by the booksellers Matthew Lownes and Thomas Fisher. The title page of the first quarto states that the play was acted by the Children of Paul's, one of the companies of boy actors popular at the time. It was followed by a sequel, Antonio's Revenge, which was written by Marston in 1600.

The play is a romantic comedy, which charts the "comic crosses of true love" faced by Antonio, son of the good Duke Andrugio, and Mellida, daughter of the wicked Duke Piero. Structurally, the plot is quite conventional, but the tone is unusual: Marston undercuts the emotion of the story of the separated lovers by introducing moments of extreme farce and burlesque, satirising and parodying romantic comedy conventions. The play also employs a metatheatrical induction, in which the boy actors are seen, apparently in propria persona, discussing the roles they are about to play and the way in which their parts should be performed.

== Synopsis ==
The play opens with a speech by Antonio, son of Andrugio, directly after he has adopted his disguise as an Amazon. In this speech, the reader learns that Andrugio is either dead or missing after a battle with the Duke of Venice and that Antonio is disguised in order to reunite himself with his lover, Mellida, daughter of Piero. Antonio can not present himself directly to Piero's court seeing as the two fathers are rivals. Andrugio is the Duke of Genoa and Piero is the Duke of Venice. Following the disclosure of this information, Mellida, her cousin, Rossaline, and her servant, Flavia, sight Antonio in disguise. They are intrigued by this unknown female "in strange accouterments" (I.i.140). Meanwhile, Mellida attempts to brush off various suitors' ploys to woo her. It is not until III.i.280 that Mellida finally recognizes Antonio. They then make plans to escape the court in order to follow their passions and wed. However, their plans become complicated when Piero discovers Antonio's deception. He orders his daughter to confinement and sends his men out to hunt for Antonio, who has fled from the scene. Meanwhile, it is revealed that Andrugio is alive and has disguised himself as a lower ranking nobleman. Another series of disguises are desperately adopted by the lovers. Mellida dresses as a page boy and Antonio dresses as a sailor. These disguises act as a last attempt to escape the court and flee together. However, the characters become separated once more. Andrugio and Antonio become reunited by chance and they decide that together they will find Mellida and make peace with the court. However, as soon as Andrugio exits the stage, Antonio and Mellida become unexpectedly reunited and exchange words of loving joy, which are written in Italian. Following this, the two lovers separate one final time, promising to meet again soon and finally marry. The scene transitions to the court where Andrugio presents himself to Piero, despite having a bounty on his head, in order to deliver the news that Antonio has been seemingly murdered. Andrugio even carries his son's coffin to the court. Piero becomes so moved by his enemy's valor and hardship that he decides to embrace Andrugio and reward him with the promised bounty ("twenty thousand double pistolets with the endearing to my dearest love" V.ii.245). At this moment, Antonio rises from the coffin and confesses that his death was staged in order to bring peace to the courts. Antonio and Mellida become happily married and Piero and Andrugio make amends. Throughout this complicated play, there is also a subplot featuring Mellida's cousin in which she is humorously wooed by many suitors, but ultimately decides to remain single at the conclusion of the play.

== Characters ==
- Andrugio, Duke of Genoa
- Antonio, Andrugio's son
- Lucio, Antonio's counselor
- Piero, Duke of Venice
- Feliche, Gentleman of Piero
- Balurdo, Gentleman of Piero
- Alberto, Gentleman of Piero
- Castilio Balthazar, Gentleman of Piero
- Forobosco, Gentleman of Piero
- Catzo, page to Castilio
- Dildo, page to Balurdo
- Galeatzo, son to the Duke of Florence
- Matzagente, son to the Duke of Milan
- Mellida, daughter of Piero
- Flavia, Gentlewoman of Mellida
- Rossaline, Mellida's cousin
- A painter
- A page
