= Antonio's Revenge =

Play written by John Marston

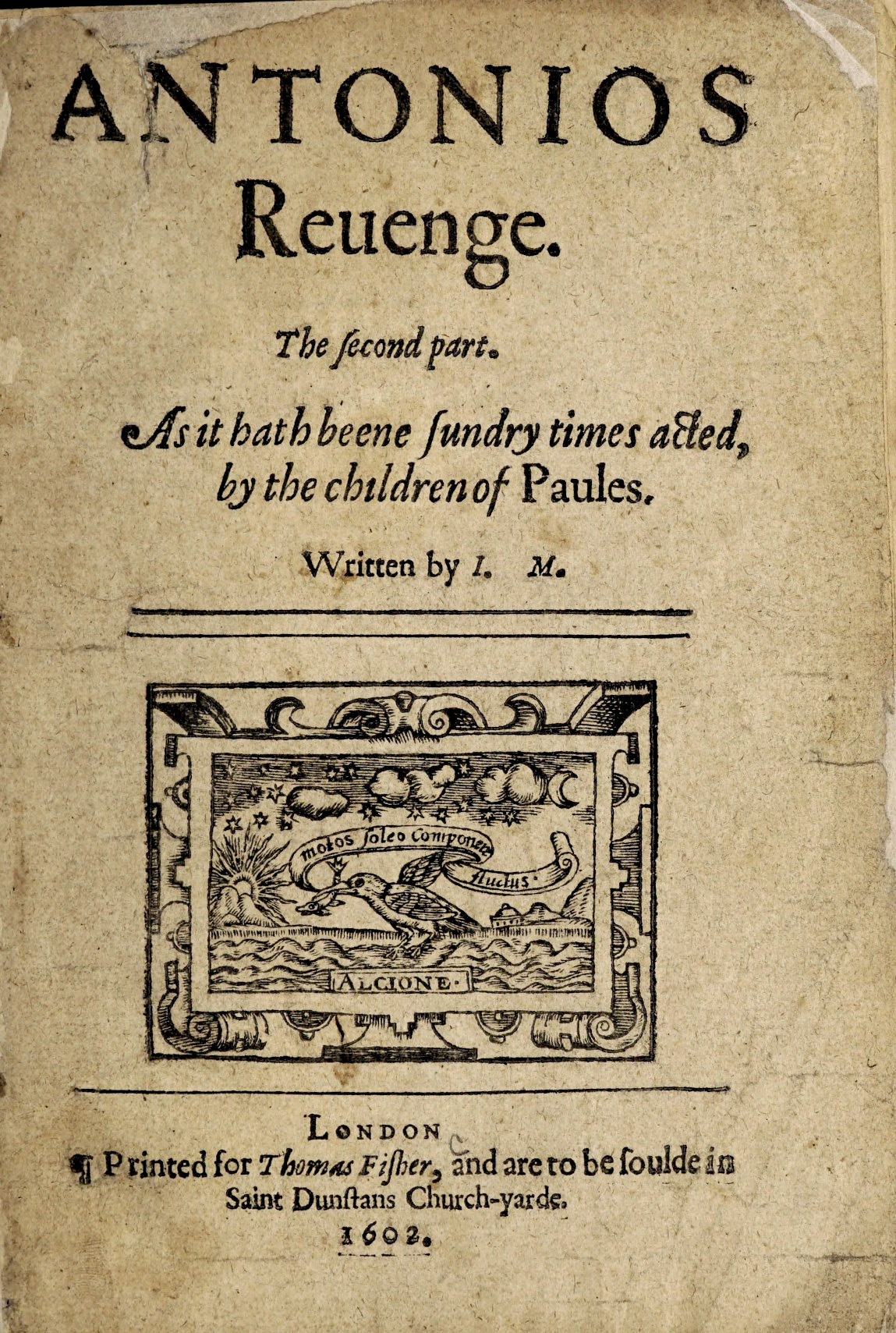
Title page of the first edition of Antonio's Revenge (1602)

Antonio's Revenge is a late Elizabethan play written by John Marston and performed by the Children of Paul's. It is a sequel to Marston's comic play Antonio and Mellida, and it chronicles the conflict and violence between Piero Sforza, the Duke of Venice, and Antonio, who is determined to take revenge against Piero for the death of his father and the slander of his fiancée (Piero's daughter Mellida, to whom he is bethrothed at the end of Antonio and Mellida). While it has much in common with other revenge tragedies (particularly Shakespeare's Hamlet), it is sometimes read as a hyperbolic parody of the genre.

== Characters ==
- Ghost of ANDRUGIO, formerly Duke of Genoa
- ANTONIO, Andrugio's son
- MARIA, widow of Andrugio, mother of Antonio
- LUCIO, a servant to Maria
- NUTRICHE, a servant to Maria
- PIERO SFORZA, duke of Venice
- MELLIDA, Piero's daughter
- JULIO, Piero's young son
- STROTZO, a servant to Piero
- PANDULPHO, a gentleman of the Venetian court
- FELICHE, dead son of Pandulpho
- BALURDO, a gentleman of the Venetian court
- ALBERTO, a gentleman of the Venetian court
- CASTILIO, a gentleman of the Venetian court
- FOROBOSCO, a gentleman of the Venetian court
- MATZAGENTE, son of the Duke of Milan
- GALEATZO, son of the Duke of Florence
- 2 SENATORS
- Pages, attendants, ladies, heralds, mourners, and others

== Synopsis ==
Act I: Piero reveals that he has poisoned his former rival, Andrugio, after pretending to reconcile with him and betrothing his daughter Mellida to Andrugio's son Antonio. Maria, Andrugio's wife, returns to Venice to see her son's wedding solemnized. Antonio recounts a dream in which his father's ghost clamors for revenge. He and his mother are reunited moments before the body of Feliche is revealed in Mellida's window. Piero confesses to the murder, claiming to have caught Feliche and Mellida in bed together. Strotzo enters, announcing that Andrugio is dead. Antonio and Maria depart in grief, while Alberto and Pandulpho remain, the latter promising not to succumb to passion.

Act II: Piero gives orders for Mellida to be imprisoned in the castle vault, telling Pandulpho he means to execute her. He then attempts to persuade Pandulpho that Antonio is responsible for Andrugio's death and begs his assistance to bring him to justice. Pandulpho refuses. Antonio and Mellida converse through a vent, Antonio affirming his belief in her innocence when she informs him of her death sentence. Piero attempts to woo Maria but is rebuffed. He then hatches a plot with Strotzo, who agrees to testify that Antonio bribed him to slander Mellida and kill Andrugio. Piero promises to pardon him for his supposed crimes on account of the remorse he will feign.

Act III: Antonio visits his father's tomb and encounters Andrugio's ghost, who tells him that he was poisoned by Piero, whom Maria has consented to marry. At the ghost's urging, Antonio murders Piero's young son Julio. The ghost then appears to Maria, revealing the truth of his death to her. Antonio enters, still bloody from the murder of Julio. Andrugio's ghost bids him disguise himself and return to court until their revenge is complete.

Act IV: Antonio attends Mellida's trial disguised as a jester. Strotzo confesses, as he and Piero plotted, that he murdered Andrugio and framed Mellida on Antonio's orders; instead of the pardon Strotzo expects to receive, Piero strangles him with Castilio's assistance. Alberto, sent to summon Antonio, returns and announces that he has drowned. Mellida swoons and is carried out. Piero declares his intention to marry his daughter off to Galeatzo and to marry Maria himself. Maria returns from Mellida's bedside to inform the court that Mellida has died of grief. Piero postpones his own wedding by two days. Alberto and Antonio help to bury Feliche, and make a pact with Pandulpho to take revenge upon Piero.

Act V: The conspirators release Balurdo from imprisonment on the condition that he participate in their plot. Andrugio's ghost enters to observe Piero and Maria's wedding feast. Alberto, Antonio, Pandulpho, and Balurdo, disguised as masquers, overpower Piero, bind him, and pluck out his tongue. They reveal Julio's body, then stab Piero to death. Galeatzo enters with a pair of senators, who commend the murderers for their noble deed. The Dukedom of Venice is offered to Antonio, who refuses and vows to live a religious life and remain celibate in honor of Mellida's memory.

== Date and Text ==
Usually dated 1600 or 1601, Antonio’s Revenge is one of a number of revenge tragedies written around the same time. Emma Smith has suggested that some of these plays may have been written partly in response to the popularity of The Spanish Tragedy and disputes over its performance rights. Antonio's Revenge was entered into the Stationer's Register in October 1601 by Matthew Lownes and Thomas Fisher, and it was printed in quarto the following year. Stage directions within the 1602 Quarto refer to two of the original actors by surname rather than character, which seems to indicate that—like Antonio and Mellida—the source for the printed text may have been a prompt book. In 1633 a collection of Marston's plays which included both Antonio’s Revenge and Antonio and Mellida was printed by William Sheares, who may have done so without Marston's permission, as there is no reference to Sheares having any rights to his plays in the Stationer's Register. Since then, the play has been reprinted only sporadically.

=== Relationship to Hamlet ===
There is some critical controversy over the date of Antonio’s Revenge in relation to Shakespeare's Hamlet. Two inscriptions that appear on a pair of portraits in Antonio and Mellida, which seem to indicate the date of the play's first performance (1599) and the age of the author (24), and the prologue to Antonio’s Revenge, which indicates a change of season—from summer to early winter—between the two productions, led E. K. Chambers to conclude, based on R. E. Brettle's evidence for Marston's birth in 1575, that Antonio’s Revenge could be dated to the early winter of 1599. However, more recent findings indicate that Marston was actually born in 1576, which would place Antonio’s Revenge after Hamlet. An abundance of highly similar plot devices—including Piero's murder of his romantic rival by poison and the appearance of Andrugio's ghost—has invited criticism of the play as being derivative. However, other critics have contended that Shakespeare and Marston were working at roughly the same time on competing revenge plays and may have both used the supposed Ur-Hamlet for their source material, making similarities probable. Because there are narrative parallels but few verbal ones, the likeness of the two plays may be coincidental.

== Genre ==
=== As revenge tragedy ===
Antonio's Revenge is a notable example of the early modern revenge tragedy. The play critiques the failings of the legal system by demonstrating how easily it may be abused by powerful political figures. Marston also follows the generic tradition of forcing the revenger to compromise his own morality in the process of exacting revenge. Eric Hobsbawm characterizes this didactic paradox as "banditry," or the necessity of individual transgression in the face of unjust rule and the popular elevation of such individuals to the status of "folk hero." This moral quandary is further complicated by the religious ethics of the early modern period, including conflicting Protestant and Catholic ideas about the relationship between the living and the dead. Andrugio, like the ghosts of Shakespeare's Hamlet and Kyd's Spanish Tragedy, personifies the period of unrest between death and interment, sometimes interpreted as an allusion to Catholic purgatory. The play is also fraught with physical violence, including the display of Feliche's mutilated body, the strangulation of Strotzo, the murder of the child Julio and subsequent revelation of his body at the banquet table, and the forcible removal of Piero's tongue. Piero makes his first entrance with "his arms bare, smeared in blood, a poniard in one hand bloody, and a torch in the other" (1.1, s.d.) and Antonio enters in an almost identical manner after his murder of Julio, "his arms bloody, [with] a torch and poniard" (3.5, s.d.). This dramaturgical parallel is not only a visual representation of culpability but a means of foregrounding one of the other common themes of revenge tragedy, namely the inevitable mirroring of the villain and the tragic hero. At stake here is a physical manifestation of what Jonathan Dollimore describes as "discontinuous identity," or the plight of characters experiencing social and psychic dislocation as they struggle against an inherently corrupt society. The theme of disorientation is further complicated by extreme feelings of grief which lead to distraction and madness, another common feature of revenge tragedy, displayed in Antonio's Revenge both by Maria's running onstage with "her hair about her ears" (3.1, s.d.) and Pandulpho's inability to adhere to his stoic philosophy after his son's murder. Antonio's Revenge is typical of its genre in depicting the fatal consequences of socio-political and moral confusion. However, unlike most revenge tragedies, the revenger himself survives the play.

=== As parody ===
Though Antonio's Revenge is often criticized or compared unfavorably with Hamlet due to its hyperbolic style, some critics have posited that this is not an artistic failing on Marston's part but rather a deliberate mockery of the revenge tragedy genre. The play is metatheatrically self-aware, commencing with Piero's demand that Strotzo applaud his bloody deeds. The conceit continues with Strotzo's performance of guilt and grief before the court at Mellida's mock-trial, and with Antonio's various disguises—first as a fool, and then as a masquer in the company of Alberto, Pandulpho, and Balurdo. The language of the play is similarly self-conscious and possibly parodic, the stoic Pandulpho forswearing "apish action, player-like" (1.5.84) and Antonio promising that he "will not swell like a tragedian" (2.3.112) in response to grief, before both proceed to demonstrate exactly the fits of passion which they have renounced. The extravagantly violent spectacles of the final scene have been subjected to the severest criticism, but even this excess is possibly deliberate: Piero's death is almost a play-within-a-play, with Andrugio looking on like an audience, while the inherent theatricality of the masquers and the spectacle of the banquet table call attention to the performative nature of Piero's political power. The end is equally self-aware, with Antonio challenging any playwright who intends to write about Mellida to mount "some black tragedy" (5.6.65) on her behalf.

== Performance ==
Antonio's Revenge was originally performed by the Children of Paul's, a popular boys' company of the time. While the playing space at St. Paul's was rather small (probably not more than 500 square feet were available for seating and performance, though the actual shape and dimensions are unknown), the play makes use of at least two separate entrances, a gallery, a trap large enough to be used as a grave, and a "discovery space" which was probably utilized to reveal, at various points in the play, Feliche's body, Andrugio's ghost, and the banquet table. Antonio's Revenge relies not only on these grim tableaux but also on extensive miming and several dumb shows. In addition to these visual devices, the play includes a number of songs and stage directions requiring music and other sound effects.
