= The Atheist's Tragedy =

17th-century play written by Cyril Tourneur

The Atheist's Tragedy, or the Honest Man's Revenge is a Jacobean-era stage play, a tragedy written by Cyril Tourneur and first published in 1611. It is the only dramatic work recognised by the consensus of modern scholarship as the undisputed work of Tourneur, "one of the more shadowy figures of Renaissance drama."

== Date ==
No firm data on the play's date of authorship has survived. Scholars have conjectured a date of authorship sometime in the first decade of the 17th century—either early in the decade, based on allusions to contemporary events like the Siege of Ostend (1601–04), or later in the decade, based on perceived links with literary works like King Lear and The Revenge of Bussy D'Ambois.

Those scholars who have considered Tourneur the author of both The Atheist's Tragedy and The Revenger's Tragedy (published in 1607) have assumed that The Atheist's Tragedy must have been written first, because it seems less developed and more crude. For those who attribute The Revenger's Tragedy to Thomas Middleton, such considerations are irrelevant.

== Publication and performance ==
The Atheist's Tragedy was entered into the Stationers' Register on 14 September 1611, and published in quarto later that year by the booksellers John Stepneth and Richard Redner. Some copies of the quarto have the date altered to 1612. The title page of the quarto states that the play "hath often been Acted" in "divers places", though no specific productions or performances are known.

Also, no revivals of the play are recorded between its own era and modern times. Productions have been staged in England, for instance in 1979 (Belgrade Theatre), 1994 (Birmingham Repertory Theatre) and 2004 (White Bear Theatre Club).

== Critical responses ==
A large body of critical commentary on The Atheist's Tragedy was accumulated over the past two centuries, especially on the drama's place in the evolution of Jacobean tragedy and the revenge play. Scholars have considered the play's relationship to Calvinist theology and "Baconian rationalism" among other issues. The play's complex three-level plot structure has also been studied. Critics have debated possible sources of Tourneur's plot, though no certain and unambiguous source has been identified.

== Synopsis ==
D'Amville is a wealthy French nobleman and a cynical, ruthless, Machiavellian atheist, who exchanges metaphysical and theological eternity and everlasting life for biological heredity, replaces divine providence by providence alone, financial precautions and provisions for one's earthly future, and acts on his immoralistic maxim, which ends his memorable monologue in the poetic form of a rhyming couplet (shown in italics):

Here are my sons. […]
There's my eternity. My life in them
And their succession shall for ever live,
And in my reason dwells the providence
To add to life as much of happiness.
Let all men lose, so I increase my gain.
I have no feeling of another's pain.
— Act 1, scene 1

He engineers the murder of his brother, the Baron Montferrers, and schemes to ruin his nephew Charlemont, who is away on military service, and to possess the nephew's inheritance. When Charlemont (the "honest man" of the subtitle) returns home, he finds that he has been declared dead, and his fiancée Castabella has been married to D'Amville's son Rousard. Charlemont confronts his uncle and fights with Sebastian, D'Amville's younger son; Charlemont wins the duel but spares his cousin's life. D'Amville has Charlemont arrested. Sebastian, at heart a decent and well-meaning fellow, uses money given him by D'Amville to bail Charlemont from prison. D'Amville feigns a reconciliation with his nephew, but secretly plans his murder; he also attempts to rape Castabella, but is interrupted.

Charlemont kills his intended assassin. D'Amville is able to arrange the arrest of Charlemont and Castabella on a false charge of adultery. But the aristocrat's machinations begin to sour; Sebastian is killed in a duel with his lover's husband, Baron Belforest, and the sickly Rousard dies as well. D'Amville, facing the collapse of his dynastic ambitions, begins to lose his reason. In the play's climactic scene, Charlemont and Castabella are on the scaffold, facing their death sentences; but D'Amville smashes his own skull with the axe intended for them. With his dying breaths he confesses his murder of Montferrers and his other crimes. Charlemont and Castabella are freed, and can marry, as originally intended, at the play's end.

The primary plot is supported by a second-level action centring on Levidulchia, Castabella's stepmother. Levidulchia and Castabella represent the alternative negative and positive responses to similar situations: both have unwanted and unloved husbands, and both are attracted to other men. But Levidulchia is sensuous and unprincipled where Castabella remains virtuous. Levidulchia pursues an adulterous relationship with Sebastian, and attempts to seduce another man too. Her affair results in a duel that causes the deaths of both participants, her lover Sebastian and her husband Baron Belforest. In its aftermath, Levidulchia commits suicide.

A tertiary comic subplot features the clownish Languebeau Snuffe, who attempts to seduce Soquette, Castabella's servant. Snuffe is Baron Belforest's chaplain; he is a Puritan, and also a hypocrite who is tangentially involved in both the superior plots as a willing stooge for both D'Amville and Levidulchia. His attempted seduction of Soquette is a ridiculous failure.

The play takes a negative view of personal vengeance, stressing instead divine judgement upon sinners and wrongdoers. The ghost of Montferrers appears in the play—but to comply with Christian requirements and unlike the ghost in Hamlet and other plays of the era (which draw on the precedents of the revenge ghosts in the plays of Seneca the Younger), Montferrers' ghost counsels Charlemont to abjure revenge, to leave it in the hands of divine providence.
