= Thyestes (Seneca) =

Roman tragedy by Seneca the Younger

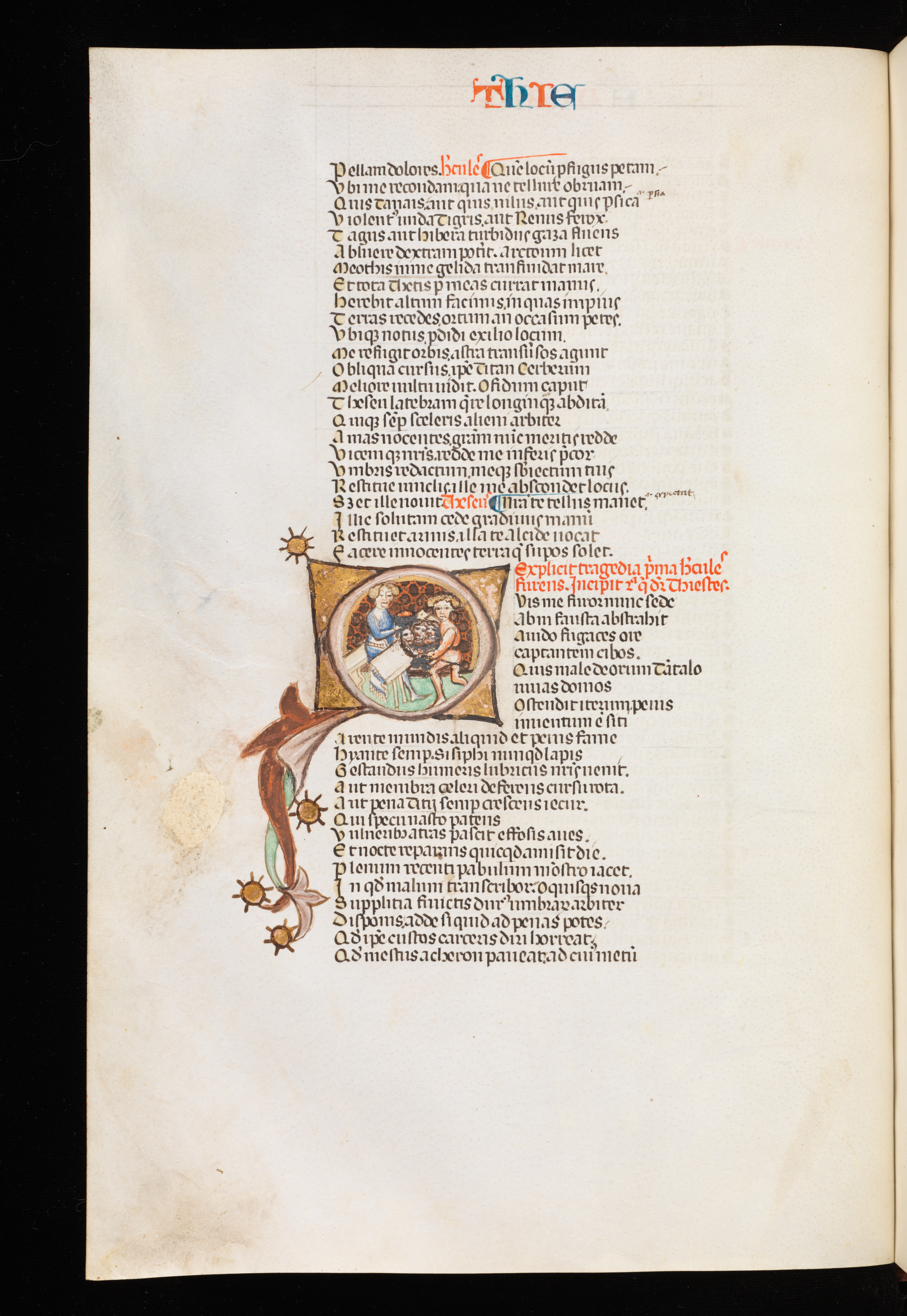
- First page of Thyestes from a 15th-century Italian manuscript
- Author: Lucius Annaeus Seneca
- Language: Latin
- Genre: Tragedy
- Set in: Mycenae and Argos
- Publication date: 1st century
- Publication place: Rome
- Text: Thyestes at Wikisource

Thyestes is a first century AD fabula crepidata (Roman tragedy with Greek subject) of approximately 1112 lines of verse by Lucius Annaeus Seneca, which tells the story of Thyestes, who unwittingly ate his own children who were slaughtered and served at a banquet by his brother Atreus. As with most of Seneca's plays, Thyestes is based upon an older Greek version with the same name by Euripides.

== Characters ==
- Thyestes, Brother of Atreus, in exile
- Atreus, King of Argos
- Plisthenes (silent role), son of Thyestes
- Tantali umbra (ghost of Tantalus), grandfather of Atreus & Thyestes
- Furia (Rage, Fury), often interpreted as Megaera
- satelles, attendant or guard of Atreus
- nuntius, messenger
- Chorus

== Plot ==
Pelops, the son of Tantalus, had banished his sons for the murder of their half-brother, Chrysippus, with a curse upon them. Upon the death of Pelops, Atreus returned and took possession of his father's throne. Thyestes, also, claimed the throne: he seduced his brother's wife, Aërope, and stole by her assistance the magical, gold-fleeced ram from Atreus’ flocks, upon the possession of which the right to rule was said to rest. For this act he was banished by the king. But Atreus has long been meditating a more complete revenge upon his brother; and now in pretended friendship has recalled him from banishment, offering him a place beside himself upon the throne.

=== Act I ===
Tantalus is brought from the underworld by the Fury, and he is compelled to foster the wicked enmity between his grandsons, Atreus and Thyestes, the sons of Pelops.

The Chorus invokes the presiding deities of the cities in Peloponnesus, that they will prevent and avert the wickedness and crimes that are now hatching in the Palace of Pelops, and chants of the impious crimes of Tantalus.

=== Act II ===
Atreus consults with his guard as to the best way of carrying out vengeance on his brother. The guard, however, will not listen, and advises him only to do what is right. But Atreus decides on an impious and horrible plan for executing his revenge.

The Chorus reproves the ambition of rulers, and points out what a true king should be, and lastly sings in praise of a retired life.

=== Act III ===
Thyestes, being recalled by his brother Atreus via his sons, returns to his country, not however without distrust, and a mind foreshadowing disaster. His sons are tendered as hostages, so that he will return.

Atreus has entrapped his brother, and applauds silently to himself. He goes forth to meet him pretending to forgive.

The Chorus, apparently oblivious to the preceding act, praises the fraternal affection of Atreus which has put aside the hatred and differences between the brothers, in much the same way as the calm which follows a storm illustrates.

=== Act IV ===
A Messenger who was present at the site of the murder reports the cruel deed of Atreus, how the three children were killed, and how they were then served up to Thyestes at the horrible feast.

The Chorus, observing the going down of the Sun, becomes alarmed, fearing that the whole fabric of the universe should dissolve into fragments and lapse into eternal chaos.

=== Act V ===
Wicked Atreus gleefully congratulates himself on his cruel revenge, and reveals to his brother Thyestes the dreadful feast which he had eaten, and the serving up of the blood of his sons.

== Chorus ==
An aspect of Thyestes that is not well understood is the existence of the Chorus, which, following Greek practice, appears after the first Act. This would explain why they are unaware of what happened with Tantalus and the Fury. Critics believe that this is due to the fact that Seneca expected the play to be acted out, which would explain the Chorus' ignorance throughout much of the play. The second chorus is unfamiliar with what happened in Act II because they were not present on stage at that time. This is why they were unaware of Atreus' true plans to trick Thyestes and feed him his own children. It was not until Act IV that they were told of Atreus' crimes by the messenger. Some critics think that the contrast between what the Chorus says and what actually happens is confusing to the audience, which is why the Chorus is the least understood aspect of Senecan dramas.

== Translations and influence ==
In 1560 Jasper Heywood, then a Fellow of All Souls College, Oxford, published a verse translation, which was republished in 1581 as part of Seneca, his tenne tragedies, translated into Englyſh. Watson Bradshaw composed a prose English translation in 1902. In 1917, Frank Justus Miller published another prose translation to accompany the original in the Loeb Classical Library. A new Loeb edition of Seneca's tragedies by John G. Fitch was published in 2002. Oxford University Press issued a new poetic translation of the play by Emily Wilson in 2010 as part of the title "Six Tragedies of Seneca." It generally corresponds to the Latin critical edition, "Seneca Tragoedia," edited by Otto Zwierlein (Clarendon Press, 1986).

Shakespeare's tragedy Titus Andronicus derives some of its plot elements from the story of Thyestes. In 1681, John Crowne wrote Thyestes, A Tragedy, based closely on Seneca's Thyestes, but with the incongruous addition of a love story. Prosper Jolyot Crebillon (1674–1762) wrote a tragedy "Atree et Thyeste" (1707), which is prominent in two tales of ratiocination by Edgar Allan Poe. In 1796, Ugo Foscolo (1778–1827) wrote a tragedy called Tieste that was represented first in Venice one year later. British dramatist Caryl Churchill also wrote a rendition of Thyestes. Her specific translation was performed at the Royal Court Theater Upstairs in London on June 7, 1994 In 2004, Jan van Vlijmen (1935–2004) completed his opera Thyeste. The libretto was a text in French by Hugo Claus, based on his 20th century play with the same title (in Dutch: Thyestes). Thyestes appears in Ford Ainsworth's one-act play, Persephone.
