= Cyril Tourneur =

16th/17th-century English soldier, diplomat, and dramatist

Cyril Tourneur (/ˈtɜːrnər/; died 28 February 1626) was an English soldier, diplomat and dramatist who wrote The Atheist's Tragedy (published 1611); another (and better-known) play, The Revenger's Tragedy (1607), formerly ascribed to him, is now more generally attributed to Thomas Middleton.

== Life ==
Little is known of Cyril Tourneur's early life. It has been suggested that he was either son of Edward Tournor of Canons, Great Parndon (Essex), or his grandson via Captain Richard Turnor, water-bailiff and subsequently lieutenant-governor of Brill in the Netherlands. However, the literary scholar Allardyce Nicoll concluded "the evidence connecting him with the Turnors of Great Parndon is of the slightest", further observing that he had "discovered not a shred of proof for associating him with any others of the numerous Turner families of this time. Turners, of course, abounded in the late sixteenth century as they abound to-day". Allardyce noted that the alleged connection of Cyril Tourneur with the Great Parndon family is not corroborated by that place's official records. He served in his youth Sir Francis Vere and Sir Edward Cecil. His literary activities seem to be concentrated in the period 1600–1613. In 1613 and 1614 he was employed in military and diplomatic service in the Low Countries. In 1625 he was appointed to be secretary to the council of war for the Cádiz Expedition. This appointment was cancelled, but Tourneur sailed in Cecil's company to Cádiz. On the return voyage from the disastrous expedition, he was put ashore at Kinsale with other sick men and died in Ireland on 28 February 1626.

== Writings ==
A difficult allegorical poem called The Transformed Metamorphosis (1600) is Tourneur's earliest extant work; an elegy on the death of Prince Henry, son of James I of England, is the latest (1613). Tourneur's other non-dramatic works include a prose pamphlet, Laugh and Lie Down (1605), some contributions to Sir Thomas Overbury's Book of Characters and an epicede on Sir Francis Vere. This poem conveys the poet's ideal conception of a perfect knight or happy warrior.

Tourneur's primary dramatic work is The Atheist's Tragedy, or The Honest Man's Revenge which was published in 1611. A case has been made by Johan Gerritsen that Tourneur is the author of the first act of The Honest Man's Fortune (1613), a play from the Beaumont & Fletcher canon usually attributed to John Fletcher, Philip Massinger and Nathan Field. In addition there is a lost play, The Nobleman, and the lost Arraignment of London written with Robert Daborne.

Tourneur's current reputation however rests on The Atheist's Tragedy. It confidently reproduces themes and conventions which are characteristic of medieval morality plays and of Elizabethan memento mori emblems. It uses these conventions in the context of Calvin's Protestant theology. This and Tourneur's other uncontested works, show him to be "a traditional Christian moralist, with a consistent didactic bent." The play recalls Jonson's The Alchemist and Volpone in the character of Languebeau Snuffe, and may also be a response to The Revenge of Bussy D'Amboise.

As regards The Revenger's Tragedy, the play was published anonymously, and was first attributed to Cyril Tourneur by Edward Archer in 1656. The attribution was also made by Francis Kirkman in lists of 1661 and 1671. Critics supporting Tourneur's authorship attribution argued that the tragedy is unlike Middleton's other early dramatic work, and that internal evidence, including some idiosyncrasies of spelling, points to Tourneur. However, the consensus of modern scholarship attributes the play to Middleton, citing stylistic similarities to Middleton's other work and contextual evidence.

Modern stagings of The Atheist's Tragedy remain few and far between.

== Reputation ==
Charles Lamb writes of The Atheist's Tragedy: “The reality and life of the dialogue, in which Vindici and Hippolito first tempt their mother, and then threaten her with death for consenting to the dishonor of their sister, passes any scenical illusion I ever felt. I never read it but my ears tingle, and I feel a hot blush overspread my cheeks, as if I were presently about to proclaim such malefactions of myself, as the brothers here rebuke in their unnatural parent, in words more keen and dagger-like than those which Hamlet speaks to his mother. Such power has the passion of shame truly personated, not only to strike guilty creatures unto the soul, but to 'appall' even those that are 'free.'"

In From Shakespeare to Pope (1885), Edmund Gosse writes: "Fifteen years ago it used to be all the fashion among young men of poetic aspirations to affect the tragedies of Cyril Tourneur. The name was an agreeable one, the plays were very rare and difficult to meet with, and accordingly Cyril Tourneur became a kind of watchword of the higher culture, like Botticelli. Now Cyril Tourneur has been reprinted, with admirable care, by a very distinguished scholar, and I notice that his name becomes rarer and rarer on the lips and pens of the enthusiastic. Without expressing the least disrespect towards a writer in whom a variety of critics have found much to praise, I am bound to say that the existence of Cyril Tourneur. appears to me to be one little reason more, by the way, why the classical reaction should be regarded as absolutely inevitable. Cyril Tourneur is a regular raw-head and bloody-bones, a vampire of literature, a purveyor of yells and dead-men's bodies and churchyard curses. The passages which attracted the admiration of Charles Lamb are sudden felicities, such as I have just said can be discovered, though, I allow, in fewer numbers and in less sustained brilliance, in a vast number of examples. 'But the general tenour of his writings is so monstrous, so confused, so obscure, that there are whole pages which might have been written by a Dyak of Borneo who had strayed into the school of Lycophron. I would desire to recommend to anyone who holds that English poetry, at the beginning of the seventeenth century, was in a quiet, healthy condition, and needed merely to be allowed to go on its course, a chef d'œuvre of Cyril Tourneur's called The Transformed Metamorphosis. I remember the shouts of joy among the elect when this masterpiece was first discovered in a unique copy some twelve years ago. Well, the editor and fondest admirer of Cyril Tourneur admits that the excessive obscurity of the Transformed Metamorphosis 'arises as much from the abnormal and grotesque mould in which the whole poem is cast as from the hideous jargon in which it is written.' These are the words of a leading admirer of the school of James and Charles, and I seize them as a text for my parable. I am asked why the literature of the seventeenth century shut itself up in bondage, why it subjected itself to stiff and artificial rules, why it confined itself to dry and obvious themes; my answer is, because of the abnormal and grotesque mould in which all but the best passages of poetry had come to be cast, and because of the hideous jargon in which verse was written."

== Works ==
- The Atheists Tragedie; or, The Honest Mans Revenge (1611)
- A Funeral Poeme Upon the Death of the Most Worthie and True Soldier, Sir Francis Vere, Knight.. (1609)
- A Griefe on the Death of Prince Henrie, Expressed in a Broken Elegie ..., printed with two other poems by John Webster and Thomas Haywood as Three Elegies on the most lamented Death of Prince Henry (1613)
- The Transformed Metamorphosis (1600), an obscure satire
- The Nobleman, a lost play entered on the Stationers Register (Feb. 15, 1612) as "A Tragecomedye called The Nobleman written by Cyrill Tourneur", the MS. of which was destroyed by John Warburton's cook
- Arraignment of London (1613), stated in a letter of that date from Robert Daborne to Philip Henslowe that Daborne had commissioned Cyril Tourneur to write one act of this play.

== Sources ==
- Gibbons, Brian, (ed). (1991). The Revenger's Tragedy; New Mermaids edition (2nd edition). New York: Norton, 1991
- Gunby, David. "Tourneur, Cyril (d. 1626)". Oxford Dictionary of National Biography (online ed.). Oxford University Press. doi:10.1093/ref:odnb/27582. (Subscription, Wikipedia Library access or UK public library membership required.)
- Swinburne, Algernon Charles; Bryant, Margaret (1911). "Tourneur, Cyril" . In Chisholm, Hugh (ed.). Encyclopædia Britannica. Vol. 27 (11th ed.). Cambridge University Press. pp. 106–107. This includes Swinburne's critical assessment of the writer.
- Seccombe, Thomas (1899). "Tourneur, Cyril" . In Lee, Sidney (ed.). Dictionary of National Biography. Vol. 57. London: Smith, Elder & Co.

Other reading

- Parfitt, George, ed. The Plays of Cyril Tourneur. Cambridge, Cambridge University Press, 1978.
- Higgins, Michael H. 'The Influence of Calvinistic Thought in Tourneur's Atheist's Tragedy', Review of English Studies XIX.75 (Jul 1943), 255-262.
