= Westward Ho =

Westward Ho may refer to:

== Arts and entertainment ==
=== Literature ===
- Westward Ho (play), a 1604 play by John Webster and Thomas Dekker
- Westward Ho!, an 1832 novel by James Kirke Paulding
- Westward Ho! (novel), an 1855 British historical novel by Charles Kingsley

=== Film ===
- Westward Ho! (1919 film), a silent film based on the novel of the same name
- Westward Ho (1935 film), starring John Wayne
- Westward Ho! (1940 film), a British public information film
- Westward Ho (1942 film), one in a series of western films known as The Three Mesquiteers
- Westward Ho! (1988 film), an animated film produced by Burbank Films Australia

=== Songs ===
- "Westward Ho", performed by Westside Connection on the album Bow Down
- "Westward Ho", by John Parr from the 1990 film Go Trabi Go
- "Westward Ho!", by Moondog
- "Westward Ho! - Massive Letdown", a 2014 song by Half Man Half Biscuit
- "Westward Ho!", a 2014 album by Police Dog Hogan

=== Others ===
- Custer's Revenge, a 1982 Atari 2600 video game also called Westward Ho
- Westward the Course of Empire Takes Its Way, a mural by Emanuel Leutze, popular name Westward Ho

== Places ==
=== England ===
- Westward Ho!, a village in Devon
- Westward Ho, a district of Grimsby, Lincolnshire
- Royal North Devon Golf Club, also known as Westward Ho!

=== North America ===
- University Golf Club, British Columbia, Canada, original name Westward Ho!
- Westward Ho (Phoenix), a landmark hotel in Phoenix, Arizona, US
- Westward Ho Hotel and Casino, a defunct hotel and casino in Las Vegas, US
- Westward Ho, Alberta, an unincorporated community in Canada

== Transportation ==
- Westward Ho, a GWR 3031 Class locomotive

=== Ships ===
- Westward Ho! (clipper), an 1852 California, US clipper
- USS Westward Ho (ID-3098), a ship built by Columbia River Shipbuilding
- Westward Ho TN 54, a smack from the Sloop period, Faroe Islands

== Other uses ==
- Operation 'Westward Ho', a UK government scheme to resettle displaced persons as European Voluntary Workers in UK after the Second World War

== See also ==
- Bideford, Westward Ho! and Appledore Railway, England
- Westward Ho the Wagons!, a 1956 film starring Fess Parker and George Reeves
- Westward Ha!, a 1948 collection of miscellaneous pieces by S. J. Perelman
- Westward Whoa, a 1936 Looney Tunes short film
- Worstward Ho, a 1983 Samuel Beckett text
- Eastward Hoe, a 1605 satire on the 1604 play
- Northward Ho, a 1607 response to the preceding
- Inward Ho, a 1923 collection of essays by the journalist Christopher Morley
- Southward Ho, a 1939 film starring Roy Rogers
- Spaceward Ho!, a video game first released in 1990
