= Cuckold's Point =

Location in Rotherhithe, London

Coordinates: 51°30′17″N 0°01′58″W

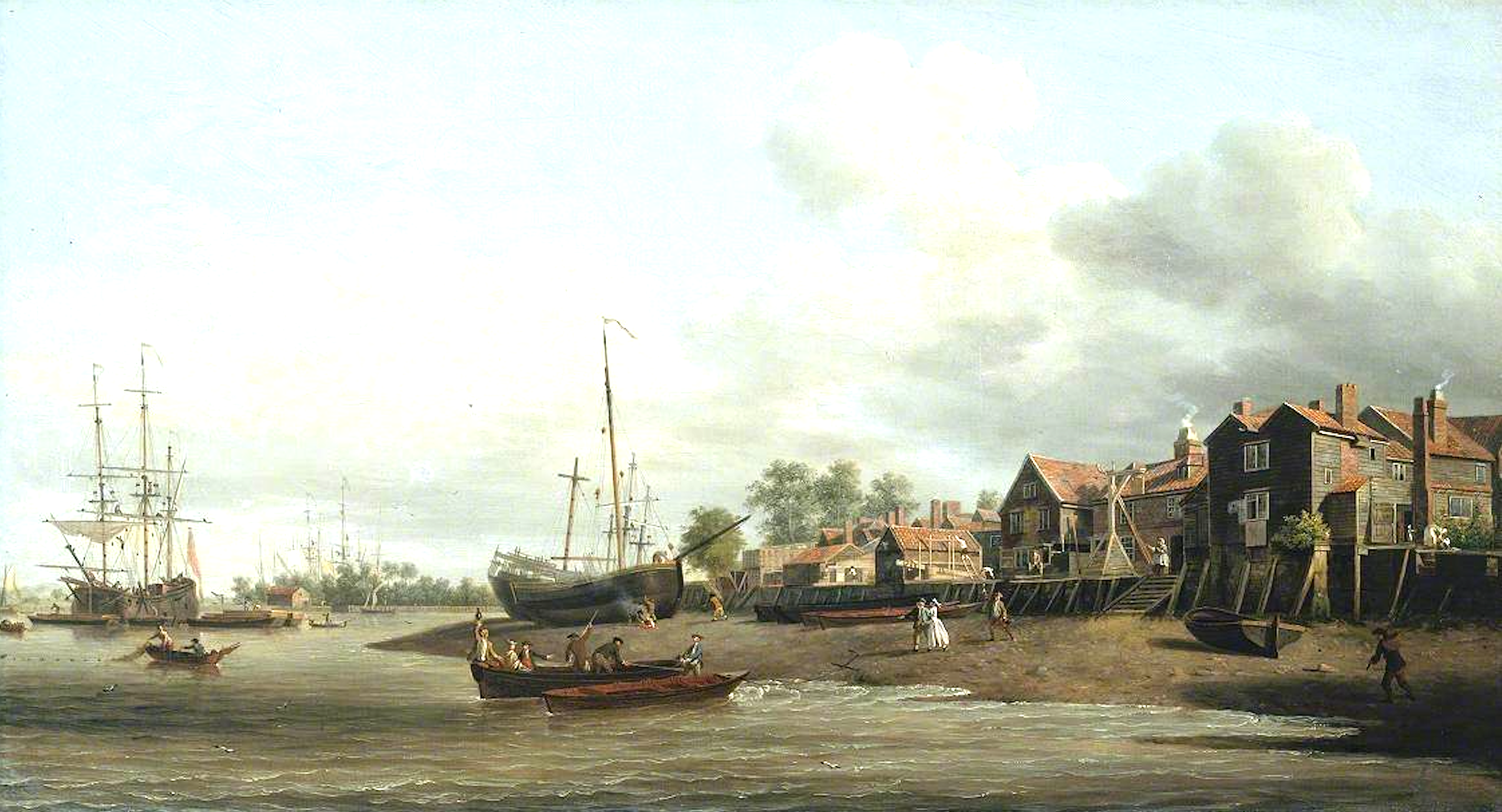
A Morning, with a View of Cuckold's Point, by Samuel Scott (1702–1772)

Cuckold's Point, also Cuckold's Haven, is part of a sharp bend on the River Thames on the Rotherhithe peninsula, south-east London, opposite the West India Docks and to the north of Columbia Wharf. The name is associated with a post (which may have been a maypole) surmounted by a pair of horns that used to stand at the location, a symbol commemorating the starting point of the riotous Horn Fair, which can also symbolise a cuckold.

== History ==
The Horn Fair was a procession which led to Charlton. It is said that King John, or another English monarch, gave the fair as a concession, along with all the land from the point to Charlton, to a miller whose wife he had seduced after a hunting trip, though this story is disputed.

Cuckold's Haven is first mentioned in writing on 15 May 1562, in The Diary of Henry Machyn, Citizen and Merchant-Taylor of London; the entry reads "Was set up at the cuckold haven a great May-pole by butchers and fisher-men, full of horns; and they made great cheer". Only two years later, however John Taylor (the Water Poet), lamented the marker's absence — in verse. It may have been a temporary or occasional structure, therefore.

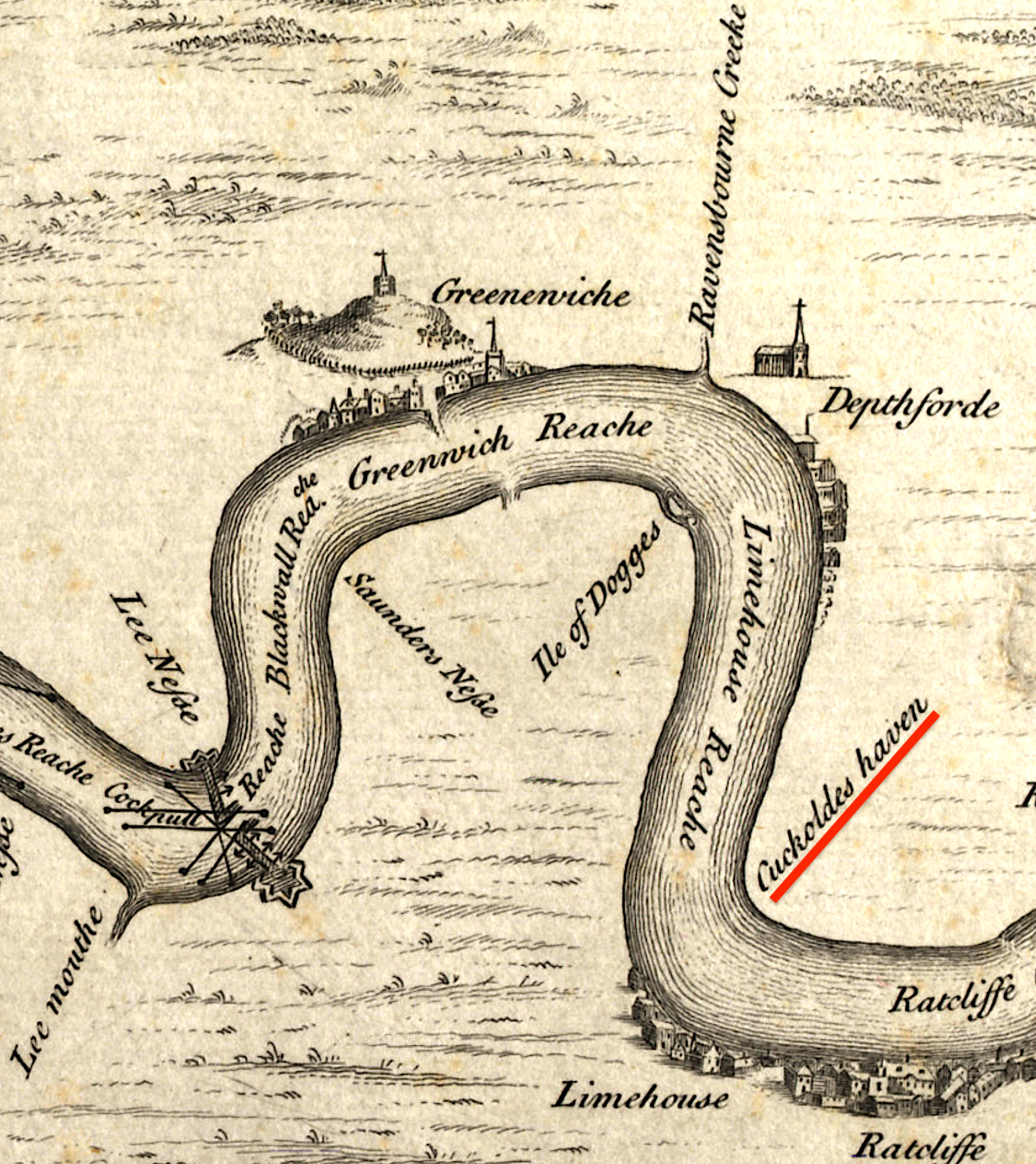
Cuckold's Haven, Elizabethan map, 1588 (north is down)

Cuckold's Haven appears on a 1588 government map of London's river defences at the time of the Spanish Armada; in the context, it is a shown as recognised landmark for mariners.

Cuckold's Point was also the location of a riverside gibbet, where the bodies of executed criminals (usually river pirates) were displayed as a deterrent to others, while it also gave its name to an adjacent shipyard during the 18th century.

== Literary and artistic links ==
For some reason English Renaissance drama was fascinated by the subject of cuckoldry, and Cuckold's Haven featured in many a play, including The London Prodigal (attributed to Shakespeare — probably falsely); Eastward Ho! (by George Chapman, Ben Jonson and John Marston, for which the authors had a spell in jail); Northward Ho! (a reply to the former); The Isle of Gulls; and The Witch of Edmonton, which contains the line

confidence is a wind, that has blown many a married Man ashore at Cuckold's Haven.

Cuckold's Point is mentioned in the diaries of Samuel Pepys. On Friday 20 February 1662/63, Pepys described a river journey from Woolwich back to The Temple:

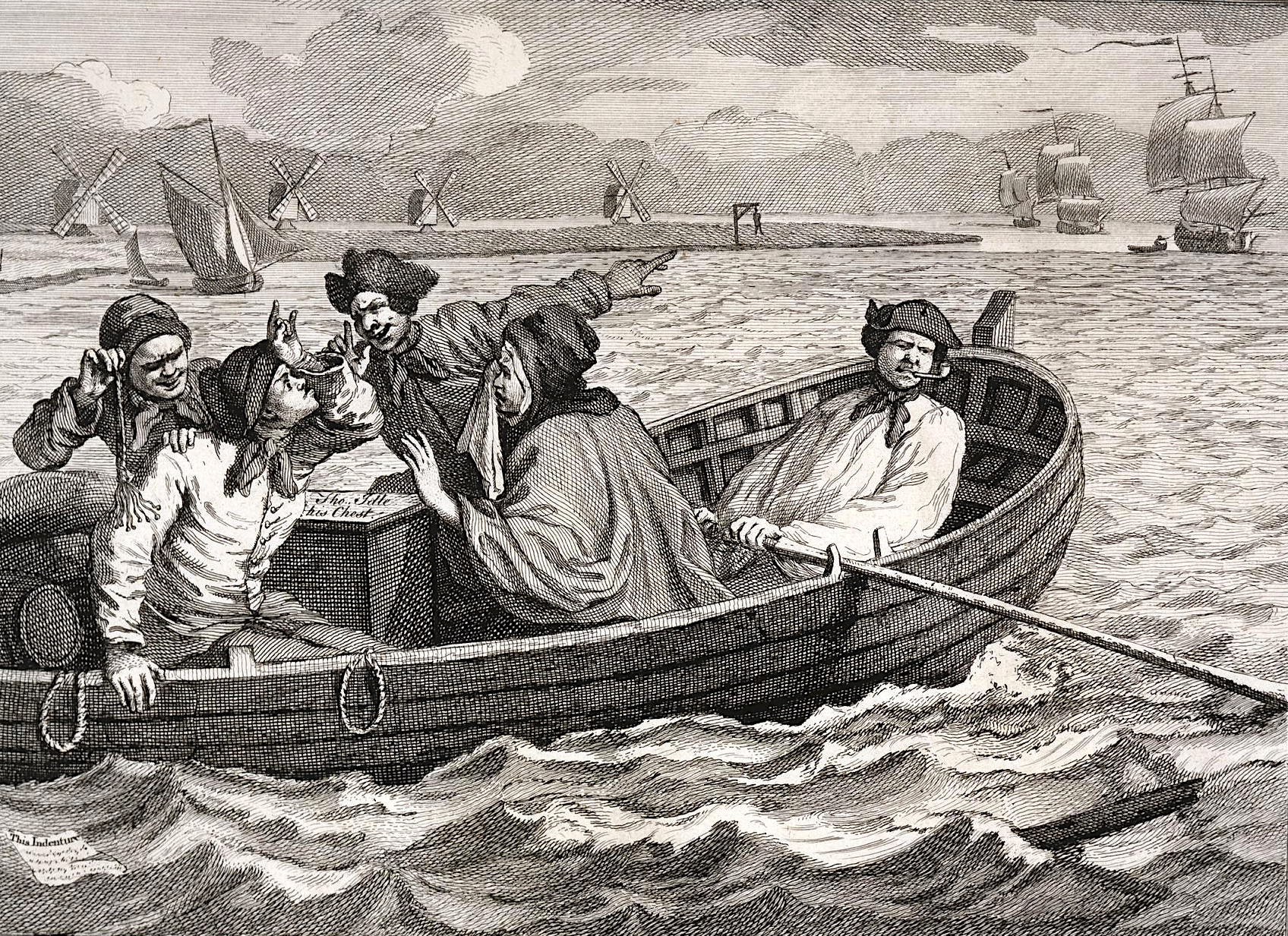
Hogarth the idle 'prentice

Up and by water with Commissioner Pett to Deptford, and there looked over the yard, and had a call, wherein I am very highly pleased with our new manner of call-books, being my invention. Thence thinking to have gone down to Woolwich in the Charles pleasure boat, but she run aground, it being almost low water, and so by oars to the town, and there dined, and then to the yard at Mr. Ackworth’s, discoursing with the officers of the yard about their stores of masts, which was our chief business, and having done something therein, took boat and to the pleasure boat, which was come down to fetch us back, and I could have been sick if I would in going, the wind being very fresh, but very pleasant it was, and the first time I have sailed in any one of them. It carried us to Cuckold’s Point, and so by oars to the Temple, it raining hard, where missed speaking with my cosen Roger, and so walked home and to my office; there spent the night till bed time, and so home to supper and to bed.

In William Hogarth's print Industry and Idleness, Plate V, the Idle Apprentice, sent to sea in disgrace, is depicted in a boat off Cuckold's Point; in allusion, he defiantly makes the sign of the horns.

== Today ==
Cuckold's Point is near to Pageant Crescent, Rotherhithe and to Nelson's Pier, from which the Docklands Hilton has a ferry connection to Canary Wharf.

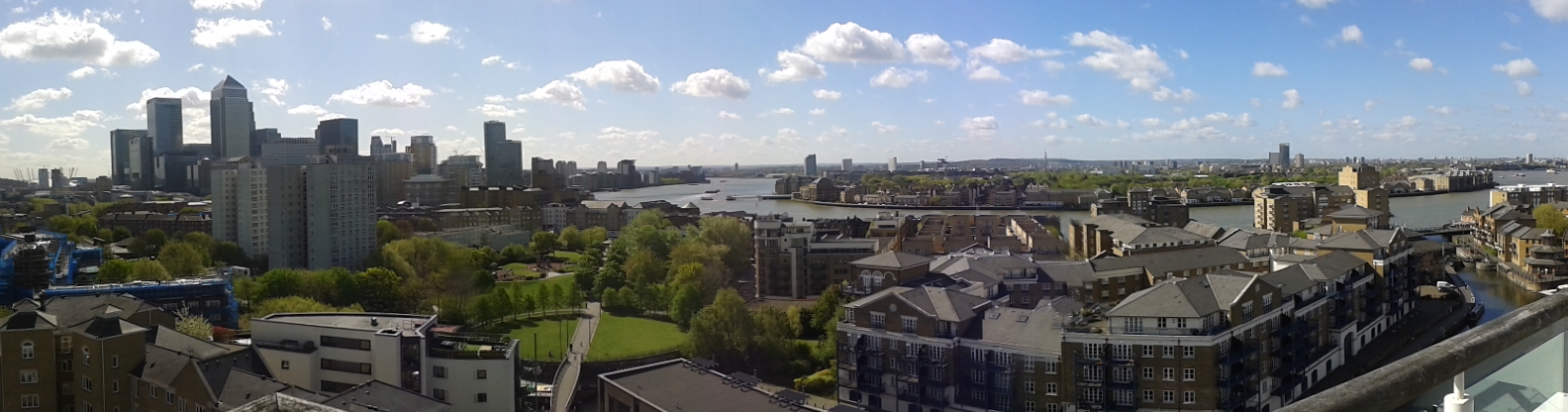
Panorama: The bend in the Thames at Cuckold's Point, showing (left to right) Canary Wharf, Limehouse Reach, Ropemakers' Fields (in foreground), Cuckold's Point (across river), Limehouse Basin lock, and the Lower Pool of London.
