= Parasitaster, or The Fawn =

Play written by John Marston

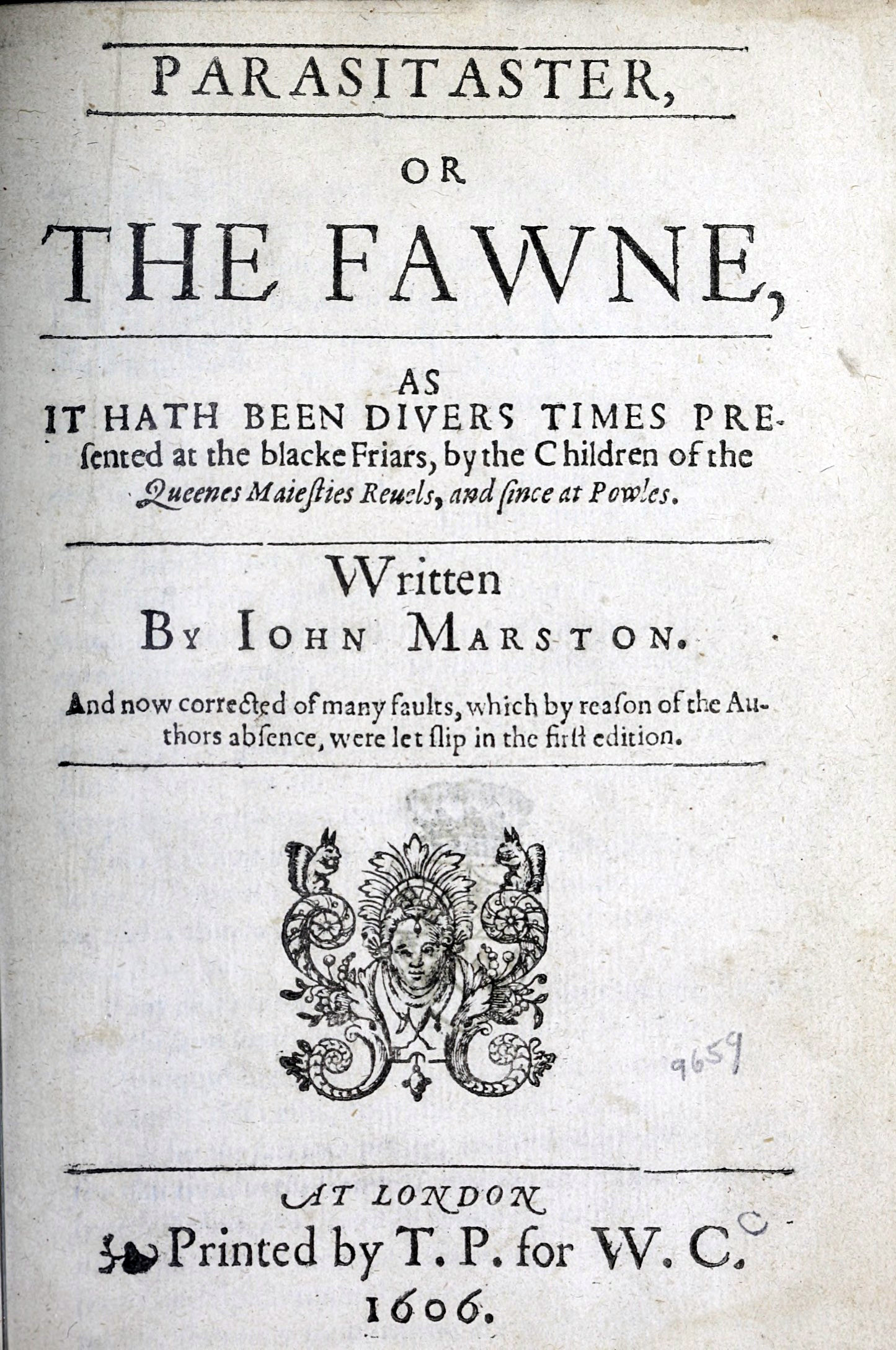
Title page of the second, corrected edition of Parasitaster, or The Fawne (1606)

Parasitaster, or The Fawn is an early Jacobean play, written by the dramatist and satirist John Marston, probably in 1604, and performed by the Children of the Queen's Revels in the Blackfriars Theatre.

The play is one of several written by Marston in the busy years 1604 and 1605, which also saw the production of The Dutch Courtesan and Sophonisba, as well as Eastward Ho, in which he collaborated with Ben Jonson and George Chapman. There is general agreement that The Fawn was most likely written and first performed in 1604, although a possible allusion in Act IV, scene i, to the bloody execution of Sir Everard Digby, who was drawn and quartered for his role in the Gunpowder Plot on 30 January 1606, suggests that the printed texts may include revisions, by Marston or others, after that date.

== Appearance ==
The play was entered into the Stationers' Register on 12 March 1606, and two different quartos of that year survive. A note on the title page of the second quarto and an addition to the prefatory address to the reader state that many errors in "the first faulty impression" have been corrected by the author in the second. In addition to simple corrections, there are a number of other small changes to the dialogue and the stage directions. In all, approximately half of the pages in the second quarto were reset; the remainder were reprinted unchanged from the first edition.

== Plot ==
The play tells the story of Duke Hercules, who disguises himself as a flattering courtier, the Fawn, in order to infiltrate the court of Duke Gonzago and observe the behaviour of his son Tiberio, who has been sent to Gonzago as an ambassador. In the process, Hercules observes the lechery of Gonzago's courtiers, who are all embroiled in seedy sexual adventures, and the vanity and stupidity of Gonzago himself, who is a pompous old windbag. At the play's conclusion, Hercules holds a symbolic Court of Cupid, in which all the foolish courtiers are arrested for their crimes against love and good sense.
