= The Wonder of Women =

Play written by John Marston

The Wonder of Women, or The Tragedy of Sophonisba
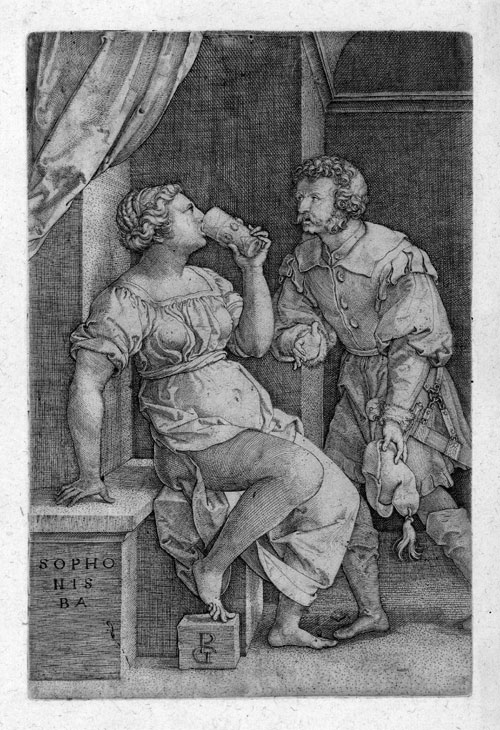
- (16th-century copperplate print by Georg Pencz)
- Original language: English
- Written by: John Marston
- Characters: Sophonisba, Syphax, Massinissa, Scipio
- Genre: Jacobean
- Setting: Carthage, c. 200 BCE

Premiere
- Date: c. 1606
- Place: Blackfriar's Theatre

The Wonder of Women or The Tragedy of Sophonisba is an early Jacobean stage play written by the satiric dramatist John Marston. It was first performed by the Children of the Revels, one of the troupes of boy actors popular at the time, in the Blackfriars Theatre.

The play was entered into the Stationers' Register on 17 March 1606, and published later that year by the bookseller John Windet. The title page of the first edition states that the play was acted at the Blackfriars, with no mention of the company's name — which indicates that the play must have been performed in late 1605 or early 1606, after the Queen's Revels Children had lost royal patronage as a result of the Eastward Hoe scandal.

The play tells the story of the Carthaginian princess Sophonisba, who is being lustfully pursued by an unwanted suitor, the lecherous and unscrupulous Syphax, despite her having recently married the noble warrior Massinissa. Meanwhile, Carthage is being attacked by the forces of the Roman general Scipio. As Carthage and its king break faith with Massinissa in an effort to fend off the combined forces of Scipio and a rebuffed Syphax, Sophonisba is forced to choose between filial allegiance to King Hasdrubal and personal fidelity to both her ideals and her husband. Ultimately, Sophonisba commits suicide so that Massinissa will not be forced to break two conflicting vows: to keep his wife free from Roman bondage and to deliver her to Scipio. By upholding Massinissa's reputation, at the play's end, Sophonisba becomes the "Wonder of Women" and the "just shame of men".

The plot is highly sensationalist and melodramatic, and the play features several scenes of high stylization, martial pomp, and ritual. Critics have often been harsh in their appraisals of The Wonder of Women. In his brief introduction to the play, editor H. Harvey Wood even declares that "[Marston's] style in Sophonisba is almost grotesquely strained and inflated in an attempt to match the dignity of the subject and the import of the occasion". In the address "To the General Reader", prefixed to the print edition of the play, Marston explains that he has written the play as a poetic statement, not a factually accurate history. The play's themes include the difficulty of acting honorably in a corrupt society, and the importance of maintaining personal integrity.
