= The Isle of Gulls =

Stage play by John Day

The Isle of Gulls is a Jacobean era stage play written by John Day, a comedy that caused a scandal upon its premiere in 1606.

The play was most likely written in 1605; it was acted by the Children of the Revels at the Blackfriars Theatre in February 1606. It was published later in 1606, in a quarto printed by John Trundle and sold by the bookseller John Hodges. A second quarto was issued in 1633 by William Sheares.

The 1606 edition was unusual in several respects. It was not licensed by the Stationers Company, as it should have been. Changes were made after the press run had begun — the publisher's name was removed from the title page, and the characters of the "King" and "Queen" were altered to "Duke" and "Duchess." These changes have been described as "unsurprising" in light of the play's obvious political satire.

The play, written in prose rather than verse, draws upon the Arcadia of Sir Philip Sidney for its plot. The problem arose from the play's satire on the political conditions and personalities of its day. The play's Arcadians and Lacedemonians were understood to be the English and the Scots (the boy actors used Scottish accents for the Lacedemonians). The title gives an unmistakably English frame of reference: a real Isle of Gulls lies in the River Thames. The character Damoetas in Day's play represented royal favorite Robert Carr, 1st Earl of Somerset. The "King" or "Duke" wastes public funds on himself and his "Queen" or "Duchess;" he keeps corrupt counsellors and raises unworthy men to knighthood, and generally leaves the state in chaos.

The play was offensive to the new Stuart monarchy, even more so than Eastward Ho, by Ben Jonson, John Marston, and George Chapman, had been a year earlier (1605). (The Isle of Gulls in fact mentions Eastward Ho as well as the plays written in conjunction with it, Westward Ho and Northward Ho. In Eastward Ho, Sir Petronel Flash and Gertrude are shipwrecked on the Isle of Gulls.) In the case of Eastward Ho, Jonson and Chapman went to jail; in the case of The Isle of Gulls, some of the juvenile cast members of the Blackfriars production were incarcerated in Bridewell prison for a brief interval. Day was questioned by the Privy Council, and may also have been imprisoned for a time. The child actors ended up under new management.

The published text of the play includes a Prologue, in which the actor speaking the piece is interrupted by three of the audience members sitting on the stage of the Blackfriars. (The potential disruptive influence of the spectators seated at the sides of the stage is employed in other works of the era, most notably in Francis Beaumont's 1607 satire The Knight of the Burning Pestle.) Each of the three wants a different kind of play: one demands a satire, the next a love story ("a scene of venery"), and the third a "stately penn'd history." The Prologue complains of the impossibility of pleasing them all.
