= 1606 in literature =

This article contains information about the literary events and publications of 1606.

== Events ==
- January? – Sir Thomas Craig becomes church procurator.
- February... – John Day's satirical play The Isle of Gulls causes a scandal which sends several of the young actors from the Children of the Chapel to prison for short periods.
- Spring – Ben Jonson's satirical play Volpone is first performed, by the King's Men at the Globe Theatre in London.
- May 27 – The English Parliament passes An Act to Restrain Abuses of Players, tightening censorship controls on public theatre performances, notably in relation to profane oaths.
- August 7 – Possible first performance of Shakespeare's Macbeth, with Richard Burbage in the title role, amongst a series of plays presented by the King's Men before Kings James I of England and Christian IV of Denmark (his brother-in-law) at Hampton Court Palace in England.
- November 14 – Marc Lescarbot's dramatic poem Théâtre de Neptune is performed at the Habitation at Port-Royal, Nova Scotia, the first theatrical performance in North America.
- December 26 (Saint Stephen's Day) – Shakespeare's King Lear is performed at Court before King James I of England. The title role is played by Richard Burbage and the Fool by Robert Armin.

== New books ==
=== Prose ===
- Thomas Dekker
  - The Double PP
  - News From Hell
- Salvator Fabris – Lo Schermo, overo Scienza D'Arme
- Joseph Hall - Heaven upon Earth, or of True Peace and Tranquillitie of Mind
- Philemon Holland – The Historie of Twelve Caesars, a translation of Suetonius's De vita Caesarum
- Johannes Kepler – De Stella Nova

=== Drama ===
- Anonymous (published)
  - The Returne from Pernassus, or The Scourge of Simony
  - Wily Beguiled
- Anonymous (probably Thomas Middleton) – The Revenger's Tragedy
- George Chapman
  - Sir Giles Goosecap (attributed; published)
  - The Gentleman Usher (published)
  - Monsieur D'Olive (published)
- John Day – The Isle of Gulls
- Lope de Vega
  - El anzuelo de Fenisa (Fenisa's Hook)
  - La discreta enamorada
  - El gran duque de Moscovia
- Ben Jonson
  - Volpone
  - Hymenaei
- John Marston
  - The Wonder of Women, or the Tragedy of Sophonisba
  - Parasitaster, or The Fawn (published)
- Thomas Middleton (attributed) – The Puritan, or, The Widow of Watling-Street (probable date)
- William Shakespeare
  - Macbeth (possible first performance)
  - King Lear (first recorded performance)
- Edward Sharpham – The Fleir

=== Poetry ===
- Hieronim Morsztyn – Światowa Rozkosz (Worldly Pleasure)
- Jean Passerat (posthumous) – Recueil des œuvres poétiques

== Births ==
- February 28 – William Davenant, English poet and dramatist (died 1668)
- March 3 – Edmund Waller, English poet (died 1687)
- May 12 – Joachim von Sandrart, German art historian (died 1688)
- June 6 – Pierre Corneille, French dramatist (died 1684)
- Unknown dates
  - Pierre du Ryer, French dramatist (died 1658)
  - Junije Palmotić, Ragusan dramatist and poet (died 1657)

== Deaths ==
- May 13 (burial) – Arthur Golding, English translator (born c. 1536)
- May 17 – Niccolò Orlandini, Italian Jesuit writer (born 1554)
- May 30 – Guru Arjan, Sikh Guru and compiler of scriptures (in custody, born 1563)
- September 28 – Nicolaus Taurellus, German philosopher and theologian (born 1547)
- October 5 – Philippe Desportes, French poet (born 1546)
- November 13 – Girolamo Mercuriale, Italian philologist and medical writer (born 1530)
- November 20 (burial) – John Lyly, English dramatist, poet and novelist (born c. 1553)
- November 22 – Sir Henry Billingsley, English translator (birth year unknown)
- Approximate dates
  - Henry Chettle, English dramatist (born c. 1564)
  - Lucas Janszoon Waghenaer – Dutch cartographer (born 1533/1534)
