= Charlton Horn Fair =

The Charlton Horn Fair was an English celebration held in Charlton, London at Cuckold's Point. It shared its date October 18, with St. Luke's Day. The 18th-century fair was infamous for its debauchery, and was discontinued in 1872. An article published in Daily News (1872) attributed the closing of the fair to "a week of burglary in the parish, the demoralization of servants, and so general a reign of the Lord of Misrule over the place that the locality took months to recover its tone."

Humorist Edward Ward (1667–1731) wrote a satirical poem chronicling the fair, titled A frolick to Horn-Fair with a walk from Cuckold's-point thro' Deptford and Greenwich. A description of the fair can also be found in The 1811 Dictionary of the Vulgar Tongue by Francis Grose.

Daniel Defoe wrote of Charlton and the Horn Fair, describing it as:

a village famous, or rather infamous for the yearly collected rabble of mad-people, at Horn-Fair; the rudeness of which I cannot but think, is such as ought to be suppressed, and indeed in a civiliz'd well govern'd nation, it may well be said to be unsufferable. The mob indeed at that time take all kinds of liberties, and the women are especially impudent for that day; as if it was a day that justify'd the giving themselves a loose to all manner of indecency and immodesty, without any reproach, or without suffering the censure which such behaviour would deserve at another time. (from A Tour through Great Britain)

Local newspapers of the time (1842–1872) such as The Morning Post, The Morning Chronicle and Daily News wrote extensively on the antics performed at the Horn Fair, building upon its reckless reputation until its dismantling.

The Greenwich Heritage Centre has a painting depicting the fair by W. Woodley.

A tamer version of the fair was re-established in 1973 in the grounds of Charlton House.
