= 1605 in literature =

This article contains information about the literary events and publications of 1605.

== Events ==
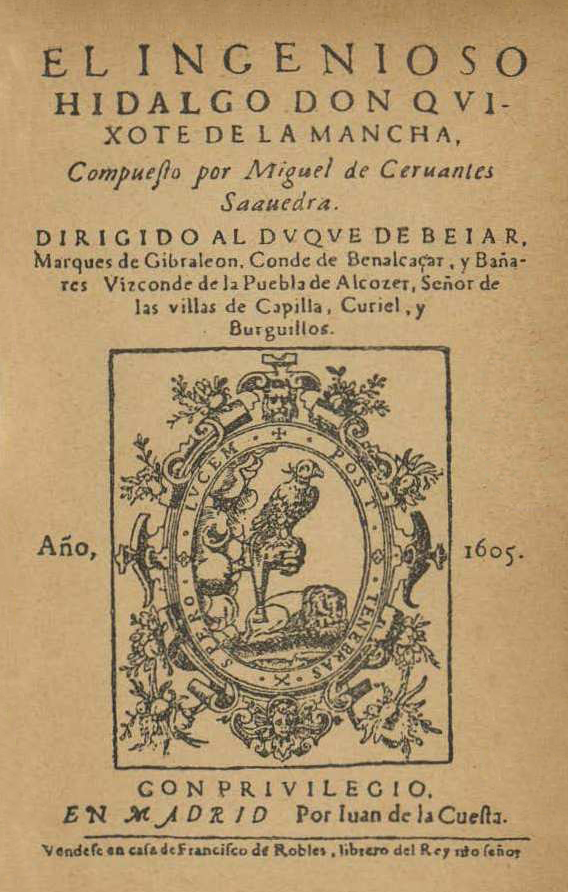
Don Quixote 1st ed. title page

- January 1 – The Queen's Revels Children perform George Chapman's All Fools at the court of King James I of England.
- January 6 – At the first performance of The Masque of Blackness at the Banqueting Hall, Whitehall Palace, the cast includes Penelope Rich and Lady Mary Wroth.
- January 7 – The King's Men perform Shakespeare's Henry V at court.
- January 8 – Ben Jonson's Every Man Out of His Humour is performed at court by the King's Men.
- January – The King's Men perform Love's Labour's Lost before Queen Anne.
- January 16 – The first part of Miguel de Cervantes' satire on chivalry, Don Quixote (El ingenioso hidalgo don Quixote de la Mancha, "The Ingenious Hidalgo Don Quixote of La Mancha", claimed to be translated from Arabic by Cide Hamete Benengeli), in dialects of Old Spanish and printed by Juan de la Cuesta in 1604, is published by Francisco de Robles in Madrid. Most of the first edition is shipped to Spanish America. One of the first significant novels in western literary tradition, it becomes a global bestseller almost at once and new editions, authorized and pirated, are produced across the Iberian Peninsula by the end of the year.
- February 2 – The King's Men give a repeat performance of Ben Jonson's Every Man in His Humour at court.
- February 10 and February 12 – Performances of The Merchant of Venice are given at court.
- May 30 – Bishop and historian John Spottiswoode becomes a member of the Scottish privy council.
- August 27–August 30 – King James I, Queen Anne, and their son Prince Henry visit the University of Oxford. Gentlemen from St John's and Christ Church colleges entertain them with a series of plays, including (at the latter) an early example of perspective scenery. The big success is Samuel Daniel's The Queen's Arcadia. Matthew Gwinne's Latin play Vertumnus puts James to sleep.
- October – Relation aller Fürnemmen und gedenckwürdigen Historien by Johann Carolus in Strasbourg (Holy Roman Empire) first appears. It is generally regarded as the world's first newspaper. De Nieuwe Tijdinghen, a Dutch proto-newspaper, is perhaps also published this year.

Uncertain dates

- Richard Rowlands publishes A Restitution of Decayed Intelligence in Antiquities concerning the most noble and renowned English Nation in Antwerp, including the first English-language telling of the legend of the Pied Piper of Hamelin.
- Luis de Góngora has some poems published in an anthology.
- The Rose theatre in London is abandoned after its lease runs out.

== New books ==
=== Prose ===
- Anonymous – Ratsey's Ghost
- Johann Arndt – Vier Bücher vom wahren Christenthum (Four Books of True Christianity, 1605–1610)
- Francis Bacon – The Advancement of Learning
- William Camden – Remaines of a Greater Worke, Concerning Britaine
- Miguel de Cervantes – Don Quixote
- Galileo Galilei with Girolamo Spinelli (probably) – Dialogo de Cecco di Ronchitti da Bruzene in perpuosito de la stella Nuova (Dialogue of Cecco di Ronchitti of Brugine concerning the new star)
- Melchior Goldast – Suevicarum rerum scriptores
- Garcilaso de la Vega – Historia de la Florida

=== Drama ===
- Anonymous
  - The Fair Maid of Bristow (published)
  - The First Part of Hieronimo (published)
  - The History of Richard Whittington, of his lowe byrth, his great fortune (licensed; later lost)
  - The True Chronicle History of King Leir (published)
  - The London Prodigal (published with attribution to William Shakespeare)
- Robert Armin and others – Fool upon Fool (published)
- George Chapman, Ben Jonson and John Marston – Eastward Hoe (performed and published)
- George Chapman – All Fools (published)
- Henry Chettle and Thomas Heywood (?) – The Trial of Chivalry (published)
- Samuel Daniel – The Queen's Arcadia
- Thomas Dekker and John Webster – Northward Ho
- Thomas Heywood – If You Know Not Me, You Know Nobody
- Ben Jonson
  - The Masque of Blackness
  - Sejanus (published)
- John Marston – The Dutch Courtesan (published)
- Thomas Middleton – A Yorkshire Tragedy (attributed; approximate year; published 1608 with attribution to "W. Shakspeare")
- Samuel Rowley – When You See Me, You Know Me (published)

=== Poetry ===
- Samuel Daniel – Certain Small Poems
- John Davies of Hereford – Humours Heav'n on Earth

== Births ==
- June – Thomas Randolph, English poet and dramatist (died 1635)
- July 29 – Simon Dach, German poet and hymnist (died 1659)
- July 25 – Theodore Haak, German-born Calvinist translator and natural philosopher (died 1690)
- September 12 – William Dugdale, English antiquary and herald (died 1686)
- October 19 – Sir Thomas Browne, English writer and polymath (died 1682)
- November – François Combefis, French Dominican patrologist (died 1679)
- November 4 – Thomas Nabbes, English dramatist (died c. 1645)

Uncertain dates

- Walter Blith, English writer on husbandry (died 1654)
- John Gauden, English writer and bishop (died 1662)
- William Habington, English poet (died 1654)
- Sor Marcela de San Félix, Spanish poet, dramatist and nun (died 1687)

Probable year

- Hugh Paulinus de Cressy, English church scholar (died 1674)

== Deaths ==
- March 26 – Jakob Ayrer, German dramatist (born c. 1543)
- April 6 – John Stow, English historian (born c. 1525)
- May – Edward Lively, English linguist and Bible scholar (born 1545)
- September 9 – Heinrich Khunrath, German alchemist and philosopher (born c. 1560)
- September 23 – Pontus de Tyard, French poet (born c. 1521)
- October 13 – Theodore Beza, French Protestant theologian (born 1519)

Uncertain dates

- William Haughton, English dramatist
- Lodewijk Toeput, Flemish painter and poet (born c. 1550)
