= Hugh Atwell =

English actor

Hugh Atwell (died 1621) was an English actor.

Atwell was one of the "Children of her Majesty's Revels", who is known to have taken part in the first representation of Ben Jonson's "Epicœne" in 1609. From a funeral elegy by William Rowley, upon the death of Hugh Atwell, "servant of Prince Charles", on 25 September 1621, he has been accounted an actor of some note. In the "Alleyn Papers" Atwell's name is mentioned as the witness of a loan from Philip Henslowe to Robert Daborne of twenty shillings in 1613. Atwell's name also appears as one of Alleyn's company, applying to him for an advance of money. Another player of the same surname in Henslowe's company, George Attwell, has been regarded as the father of Hugh Atwell.
