= The Dutch Courtesan =

c. 1604 play by John Marston

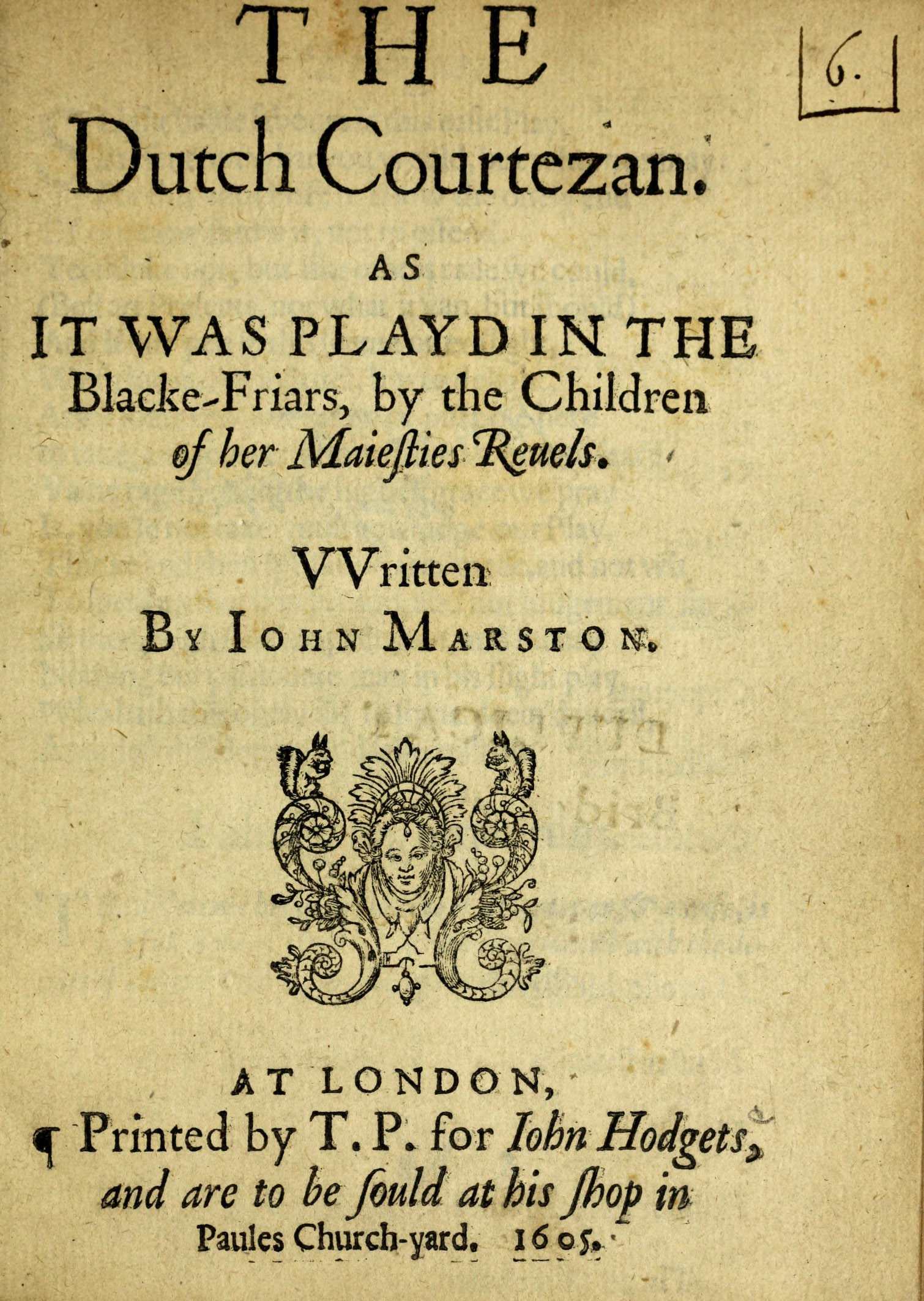
Title page of the first edition (1605)

The Dutch Courtesan is an early Jacobean stage play written by the dramatist and satirist John Marston circa 1604. It was performed by the Children of the Queen's Revels, one of the troupes of boy actors active at the time, in the Blackfriars Theatre in London.

== Printing and performance history ==
The play was entered into the Stationers' Register on 26 June 1605, and published later that year by the bookseller John Hodgets, printed by Thomas Purfoot. The play was revived in the following decade, and performed at Court by the Lady Elizabeth's Men on 25 February 1613.

The Dutch Courtesan was a popular work at the time, and was performed and adapted several times during the Restoration era, the most famous adaptation being Aphra Behn's The Revenge; or, a Match in Newgate. However, this adaptation is more sentimental and less morally complex than Marston's original.

== Plot and themes ==
Freevill is deeply involved with the "Dutch Courtesan" Franceschina but he is about to marry Beatrice, daughter of Sir Hubert Subboys and decides to break with Franceschina. He introduces her to his friend Malheureux who at once desires her. Humiliated, she promises to submit to him if he kills Freevill and bring her a ring he has received from Beatrice. The two friends pretend to quarrel, Freevill vanishes, the ring is brought to Franceschina. She goes off to inform Freevill's father and Beatrice's father of what has happened. Malheureux is arrested and condemned to die. At the last moment, Freevill appears and explains he has done this to cure Malheureux of his passion. Franceschina is whipped and imprisoned.

The play explores the nature of human desire and the problems involved with trying to lead a "good," moral life when sexuality is a fundamental part of human nature. Critics have judged the play both anti-Puritan and anti-Stoic, and have also seen it as a satire on Thomas Dekker's contemporary play The Honest Whore.

== Sources ==
It is now generally agreed that the principal source of main plot of The Dutch Courtezan was a story drawn from the first book of Les bergeries de Julliette by Nicolas de Montreulx, published in 1585. But in its moral framework the play, like much of Marston's work, is also deeply indebted to the Essays of Montaigne, especially to the essay Sur des verses de Vergil (On some verses of Vergil) (III.5), which discusses the control of physical desire and the difference between love and lust.

== Background ==
London society of the 1600s already had a stereotypical image of the Dutch prostitute – indeed the most celebrated brothel in London was called Holland's Leguer – whereby "leguer" referred to a military encampment. The character Mary Faugh – who runs the brothel – admits that she is a member of the Family of Love and the vintner Mulligrub and his wife are also identified as such. This linking of the Family of Love with promiscuity was common during this period although there is little evidence that the Familists (as members were called) actually practised free love.
