= Fenisa's Hook =

Play written by Lope de Vega

Fenisa's Hook (Spanish: El anzuelo de Fenisa) is a play written by the Spanish playwright Lope de Vega, who is considered part of the Spanish Golden Age of literature. It was first published in 1617 in the eighth part of Lope de Vega's Comedias. Based on the tenth tale of the eighth day of Boccaccio’s Decameron, it has been called a picaresque play, works that exhibit an uncharacteristic moral freedom. It focuses on merchants, the circulation of bodies and merchandise, and the seductive power of art. Boccaccio's tale is about a trickster who is tricked. Lope uses Boccaccio's story for the main plot of his play, where Fenisa, a courtesan in Palermo attempts to woo the rich merchant Lucindo in order to gain his riches. A secondary plot includes Dinarda who is dressed as a man and has come to Palermo in search of the man who seduced her and left her behind. Fenisa ends up falling for this Dinarda who is disguised as don Juan de Lara. While Fenisa is able to trick Lucindo the first time around, he comes back to Sicily a second time and this time he tricks her. In the end, Dinarda finds and marries her Albano, while Fenisa is left without a spouse and without money.

This is a light and comic play that opposes the mercantile values of Fenisa and Lucindo to the aristocratic attitudes of Albano and Dinarda. Fenisa's character is delightfully portrayed. But, she is more than a courtesan; she is a woman who delights in taking revenge on all men for having been betrayed by her first love. She also delights in her freedom, while living in a picaresque world where the rules of the aristocracy are left behind. In spite of the intricate plot line, it is Fenisa's characterization and actions that are the center of attention in Lope's play.
