= Westward Ho (play) =

Jacobean-era stage play by Thomas Dekker and John Webster

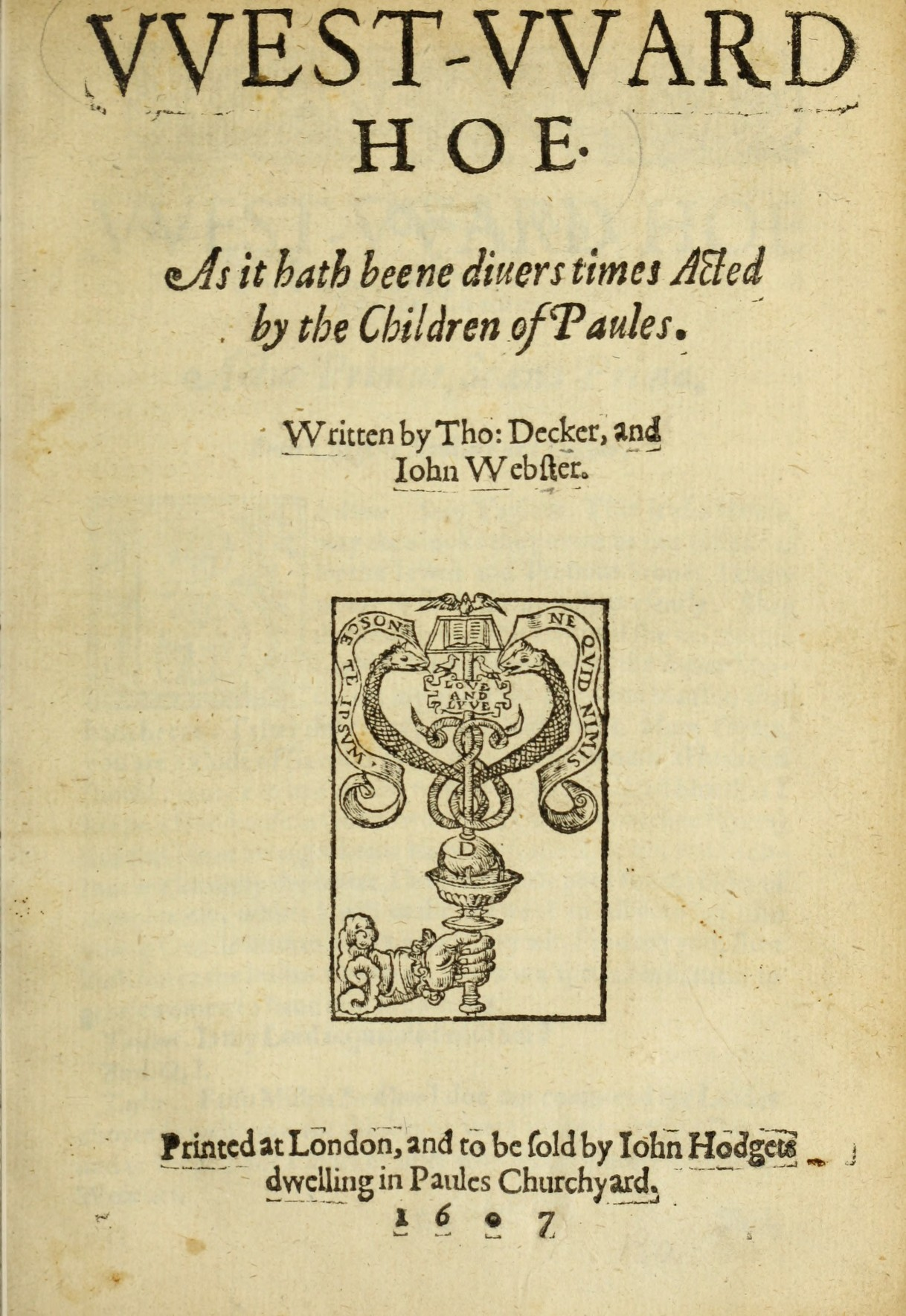
Title page of the first edition of Westward Ho (1607)

Westward Ho (or Ho!, or Hoe) is an early Jacobean-era stage play, a satire and city comedy by Thomas Dekker and John Webster that was first performed circa 1604. It had an unusual impact in that it inspired Ben Jonson, George Chapman and John Marston to respond with the famously controversial Eastward Ho (1605), landing Jonson and Chapman in jail.

== Date ==
The scholarly consensus is that Dekker's and Webster's play must have been on the stage before the end of 1604, since it provoked the reaction of Eastward Ho early the following year; some critics have dated it as early as 1603. Westward Ho was entered into the Stationers' Register on 2 March 1605, although the entry in the Register is crossed out and marked "vacat."

== Performance and publication ==
Westward Ho was entered into the Stationers' Register on 2 March 1605, and printed in quarto in 1607 by William Jaggard for the bookseller John Hodgets. The title page states that the play was acted by the Children of Paul's, one of the companies of boy actors that constituted a distinctive feature of that era.

As a response, Eastward Ho was acted by the other troupe of boy actors, then called the Children of the Queen's Revels, generating a kind of theatrical debate between two sets of dramatists and two acting companies. And Dekker and Webster would in turn answer Eastward Ho with their Northward Ho later in 1605, completing a trilogy of "directional plays".

Westward Ho received its first modern performance in 2009, at the White Bear Theatre, as part of their Lost Classics Project.

== Authorship ==
Critics generally agree that Dekker's hand is dominant in Westward Ho, while Webster's is the minority contribution; but they have disagreed on particulars. Peter Murray estimated Webster's share at roughly 40% of the whole. Scholars have tended to see Webster's hand most clearly in Act I (especially scene i) and Act III (especially scene iii).

== Satire ==
Westward Ho is a satire that provoked a counter-satire in response. Throughout the Tudor and early Stuart periods, the city of London endured a radical expansion and transformation, from the Medieval walled city it had been, toward the modern city it would become. Much of its physical expansion took place on the westward side of the city. (The phrases "westward ho!" and "eastward ho!" were the cries of the watermen who provided taxi service by boat on the River Thames.) In their original play, Dekker and Webster took a broad-scale satirical view of contemporary events and developments in London, as it evolved "westward" into new, more egalitarian, more capitalistic and competitive forms.

In his dramatic output overall, Dekker does not show a strong preoccupation with ethics; one 19th-century critic called him a "moral sloven". Webster was capable of expressing a dark anarchic cynicism – found most blatantly in his two great tragedies, The White Devil and The Duchess of Malfi. In contrast, the trio of Jonson, Chapman, and Marston generally used satire to uphold traditional morality. To some degree, the difference between the two sets of dramatists can be conceptualised as the traditional philosophical contrast between is and ought: Dekker and Webster depicted their society as they saw it, while Jonson and his collaborators had a greater interest in directing society toward what it should be. The trio had a more overtly didactic and pedagogic side to their moral and artistic outlook than did the duo. (Jonson and Dekker had been on opposite sides of an earlier controversy, the so-called Poetomachia or War of the Theatres; and the directional plays can be, and have been, seen as a continuation of that earlier contest.)

== Synopsis ==
The play opens with Mistress Birdlime, a London bawd and procuress, bringing gifts from an Earl to Mistress Justiniano, the wife of an Italian/English merchant. The Earl has been pursuing Justiniano's wife for some time, though so far without success. Justiniano is having business difficulties, which only exacerbate his domestic problems. Justiniano tells his wife that he intends to travel to Stade in Germany; actually, he adopts a disguise and remains in London to observe and manipulate his wife and their circle of friends and associates.

That circle includes three other citizens, Tenterhook, Honeysuckle, and Wafer, and their wives. The three wives are all pursued by a set of gallants that includes Sir Gosling Glowworm, Captain Whirlpool, Masters Linstock and Monopoly. Monopoly is a special friend of Mrs. Tenterhook; when he does not pay her enough attention, she convinces Tenterhook to have Monopoly arrested for the debts he owes. Then she arranges for the arresting officer, Sergeant Ambush, to keep Monopoly at his house rather than taking him to prison, so that Mrs. Tenterhook can meet him there in private.

Justiniano is disguised as a tutor called Parenthesis who is teaching the wives their letters; in fact he facilitates contact between the wives and the gallants. The group forms a plan to evade the three husbands for an outing to Brentford (in the play it is called "Brainford"), west of London, upstream on the Thames. Their excuse for the trip is that the Tenterhooks' child, staying with his wet nurse in Brentford, is ill, and the women are rushing off to tend to him. Justiniano, disguised this time as a collier, brings this message to the citizens.

With Justiniano (apparently) absent, Birdlime succeeds in bringing Mrs. Justiniano to the Earl; he is ardent for her, but she puts him off. She condemns Birdlime as a panderess, but Birdlime dismisses the accusation. In fact it is entirely true: Birdlime runs a bawdy house that features a woman named Luce as its prime attraction. The citizens Tenterhook, Honeysuckle and Wafer all show up there; Birdlime tries to conceal their identities from each other, though the men recognise each other's voices. (At one point, Tenterhook covers Luce's eyes with his hands from behind, and asks her to guess who he is; Luce names a long list of her customers in response, a list that includes most of the male characters in the play.)

In the course of his masquerade, Justiniano exposes hidden truths about himself: he is actually solvent and not bankrupt, and his activities are motivated by his own personal obsessions – he was so possessive and jealous over his wife that he would stay awake nights to listen to her talk in her sleep, hoping that she would let slip the names of lovers. The Earl has a second meeting with Mrs. Justiniano – or so he thinks; when "she" unveils, she turns out to be Justiniano himself rather than his wife. (The women often go veiled and masked in the play, which lubricates the plot's action.) Justiniano makes the Earl think that he has poisoned his wife, to give the elderly man a good scare; when the Earl is repentant, Justiniano reveals that she is still alive. Justiniano, in his true persona, then informs the other three citizens about the journey of their wives and the gallants; Justiniano, his wife, and the three men set off to Brentford in pursuit.

The wives and gallants reach their destination and lodge at an inn – but the gallants are disappointed with the result. The wives are exploiting the gallants for their own amusement, but have no intention of sleeping with them; as Mistress Tenterhook puts it, "citizens' wives have wit enough to outstrip twenty such gulls." Mrs. Tenterhook feigns illness, spoiling the trip's romantic possibilities. When the three husbands and the Justinianos arrive, they see that the wives have passed the night locked away together, without male companionship. The husbands are somewhat chastened to find that their self-righteous suspicions were unfounded; and the couples return to London, none the worse for wear.

It can be noted that the play formally maintains conventional morality; none of the married women is actually guilty of adultery, and nobody has sex in the course of the action. The play's risque aspect is more in its tone; in its freewheeling style more than in substance, Westward Ho casts a stark light on the society of its day.

== Intertextuality ==
Thomas Middleton borrowed a plot element from Westward Ho in his later city comedy The Roaring Girl (published 1611), where he sends his characters on a trip to Brentford just as Dekker and Webster do in their play. Middleton likely expected his audience to recognise the allusion, since he mentions Westward Ho by name in his text (IV, ii, 137).

== Critical responses ==
Traditional critics who took an interest in the controversy tended to side with Jonson and company more than with Dekker and Webster. Algernon Charles Swinburne, in an essay on Webster, termed Westward Ho a "hybrid amalgam of prosaic and romantic elements" and an "amorphous and incongruous product of inventive impatience and impetuous idleness...." Adolphus William Ward, however, called Westward and Northward Ho "two rollicking comedies". Modern critics have sometimes praised the realism of Dekker's and Webster's view of their society.
