= Northward Ho =

Stage play by Thomas Dekker and John Webster

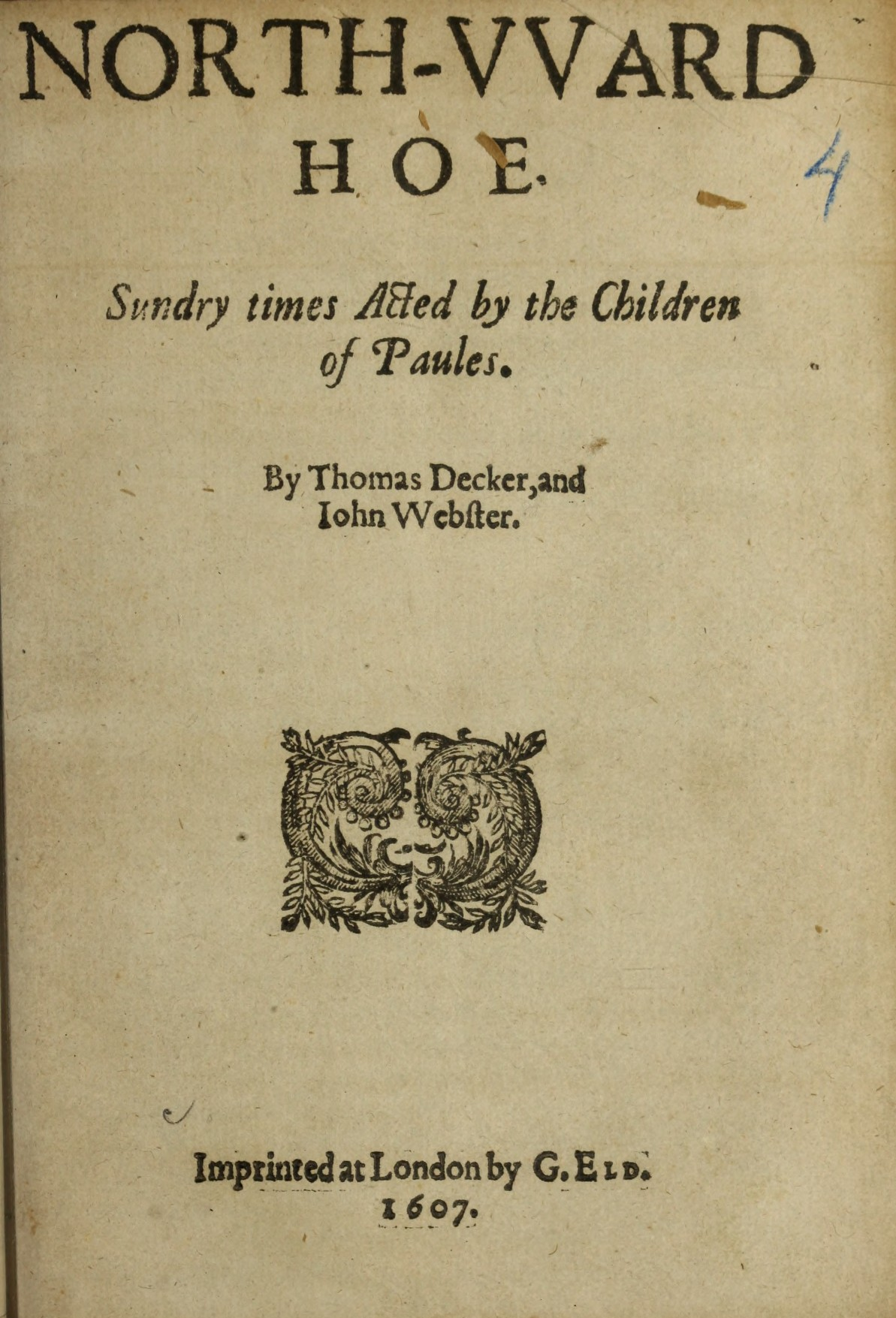
Title page of the first edition of Northward Ho, printed by George Eld (1607)

Northward Ho (or Ho!, or Hoe) is an early Jacobean era stage play, a satire and city comedy written by Thomas Dekker and John Webster, and first published in 1607. Northward Ho was a response to Eastward Ho (1605) by Ben Jonson, George Chapman, and John Marston, which in its turn was a response to Westward Ho (c. 1604), an earlier play by Dekker and Webster. Taken together, the three dramas form a trilogy of "directional plays" that show the state of satirical and social drama in the first decade of the 17th century.

== Date ==
Northward Ho could not have been staged prior to Eastward Ho, which was in existence by September 1605. John Day's play The Isle of Gulls, onstage in February 1606, refers to all three of the directional plays. This suggests that the last of them, Northward Ho, must have been performed during the last half of 1605.

== Publication ==
Northward Ho was entered into the Stationers' Register on 6 August 1607, and was published later that year in quarto by the printer George Eld. The title page of the first edition identifies the two authors, as well as the playing company that staged the work, the Children of Paul's – the same troupe that performed Westward Ho.

== Authorship ==
Scholars agree that Dekker is the predominant partner in the authorship of Northward Ho as in Westward Ho, while Webster is the minority contributor; yet, as with the earlier play, scholars disagree on the proportions of the two authors' shares. Peter Murray's argument that Webster wrote about 40% of each play is the high-end estimate; other commentators give him less. Webster's hand has been perceived most often in Act I and in Act III, scene i.

== Sources ==
The plot device of the ring that is employed in Northward Ho can be found in at least two collections of stories, the Ducento Novelle of Celio Malespini and Les Cent nouvelles Nouvelles of Antoine de la Sale.

== Critical responses ==
Commentators from Algernon Charles Swinburne to Fredson Bowers have regarded Northward Ho as superior in quality to Westward Ho. According to Bowers, "Critical opinion is unanimous in thinking Northward Ho to be the better of the two Dekker/Webster plays...."

F. G. Fleay's argument that the character Bellamont in Northward Ho represents George Chapman has been accepted by some critics.

== Synopsis ==
The play's opening scene, set in the town of Ware north of London, introduces two "gallants," Featherstone and Greenshield, and portrays their situation. The men have long been trying to seduce a citizen's wife, Mistress Mayberry, without success (a type of situation often depicted in the city comedy of the period). As a consequence, they have decided to play a malicious prank on her husband. They encounter Mayberry and his friend Bellamont, seemingly by chance, and tell the two men a story of how they (Featherstone and Greenshield) have both seduced the wife of a London tradesman; they keep her name secret at first, but then let it slip as if by accident. Most critically, they possess a ring that Mayberry recognizes as his wife's.

The two pairs part; Mayberry is deeply distressed at the idea that his wife has been unfaithful to him. His older and wiser friend Bellamont protests, and points out the obvious unlikelihood of the encounter: that the two gallants should just happen to have seduced the same woman, who just happens to be Mayberry's wife, strains credulity. Bellamont suggests that Mayberry is clearly being manipulated, and manages to salve the other man's wounded pride. Back in London, Mayberry confronts his wife; she is stung by his suspicion, but explains how Greenshield, while courting and pestering her in the Mayberrys' shop, slipped her ring from her finger and escaped with it. (This idea, of citizens' wives being courted by gentlemen while they staff their husbands' businesses, is another staple of the literature of the era.) Mayberry's suspicions are allayed – but he has a strong desire for revenge against the two gallants.

Bellamont has a son named Philip who, like many young men, enjoys the pursuit of drink, women, and gambling. In his first scene he is shown being arrested by sergeants in the outer room of a tavern, over an unpaid debt of £80. His friends Leverpool and Chartley and the prostitute Doll witness the arrest and are tempted to intervene, but Philip stops them; he sends a tavern servant to his father for bail. Doll and company decide to set up a confidence game, what was then called "coney-catching." They rent a house and present Doll as a wealthy young countrywoman, very eligible for marriage, who has just come to the city. Leverpool and Chartley masquerade as her servants. She is courted by, and exploits, various potential suitors, including a Dutch visitor named Hans van Belch, a local grocer called Allum, and a Welsh soldier, Captain Jenkins. (In Westward Ho, the character Justiniano has an Italian name but speaks and acts like an Englishman. Northward Ho, in contrast, employs blatant stereotypical ethnic and dialect humor.)

In pursuit of his revenge, Mayberry maintains a friendly relationship with Featherstone and Greenshield. Greenshield's "sister" has just arrived in London from York, and Mayberry offers the three of them lodging at his summer house. There, a conversation between two young servingmen, Featherstone's servant Leapfrog and Mayberry's servant Squirrel, reveals the true circumstances of the threesome. Greenshield's "sister" Kate is actually his wife; and Kate is having a clandestine romantic affair with her husband's friend Featherstone. She fools Greenshield by pretending to suffer from sleepwalking; on her nighttime rambles she often ends up in Featherstone's room.

Philip, playing a joke on his father, has Doll summon Bellamont for a potential commission. (Bellamont is a poet, and provides verses for fees.) Bellamont comes to Doll's establishment, but quickly understands the ruse and the nature of Doll's profession and her current activities. When Doll asks Bellamont what he thinks of her, he calls her "a most admirable, brave, beautiful whore." Once Bellamont leaves, Doll reveals that she is attracted to him. Captain Jenkins comes to Bellamont to commission a madrigal for Doll. While he is there, Doll herself arrives; Bellamont has Jenkins hide behind the arras, and Doll reveals the truth about herself. Jenkins exposes her to her other "gulls," and Doll and company find it expedient to leave the city; they flee northwards.

Featherstone, in pursuing his own sexual and financial goals, has set himself and the Greenshields on a trip to Ware; Bellamont and the Mayberrys travel along as part of their revenge plan. Along the way, the group stops at Bethlem Royal Hospital, or "Bedlam," to view the madmen; the others play a joke on Bellamont, and make the keeper think that the poet is a lunatic who has been fooled into coming to the hospital. Bellamont has a fit of temper and hits the keeper before the others come to his rescue. At Ware, the play's schemes bear their final fruit: a disguised Greenshield is tricked into offering his masked wife to Mayberry's amorous attentions... only to have their true identities exposed to each other. Featherstone's adultery with Kate is also exposed – but Featherstone is not left to triumph, since he is fooled into marrying a disguised Doll. Featherstone is appalled to learn that he has married a prostitute; but Doll asserts that she's reformed and promises to be a good and faithful wife. The would-be adulterers and seducers receive their just punishment; the others are none the worse for wear.

In Westward Ho, the trio of citizens' wives, Mistresses Tenterhook, Honeysuckle, and Wafer, are largely indistinguishable and interchangeable. The three female characters in the sequel are far more distinct, extending along the full range of morality: Mrs. Mayberry being the chaste and virtuous wife, Kate Greenshield the "bad" adulterous wife, and Doll the professional prostitute.
