= Sloop period =

Period in Faroese history

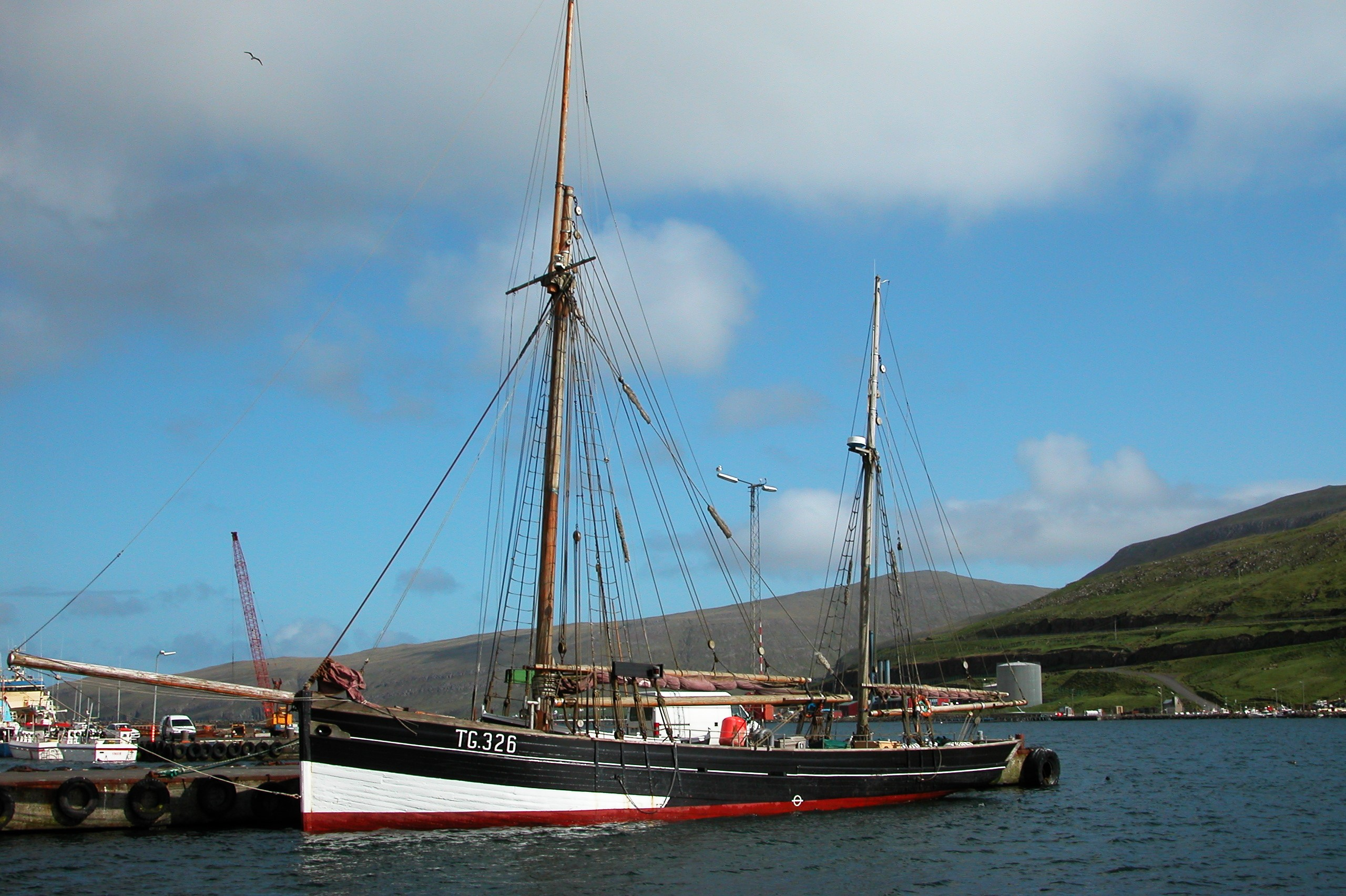
The smack (sloop) Johanna TG 325 was built in Sussex in 1884, brought to Vágur, Faroe Islands ten years later by Jákup Dahl.

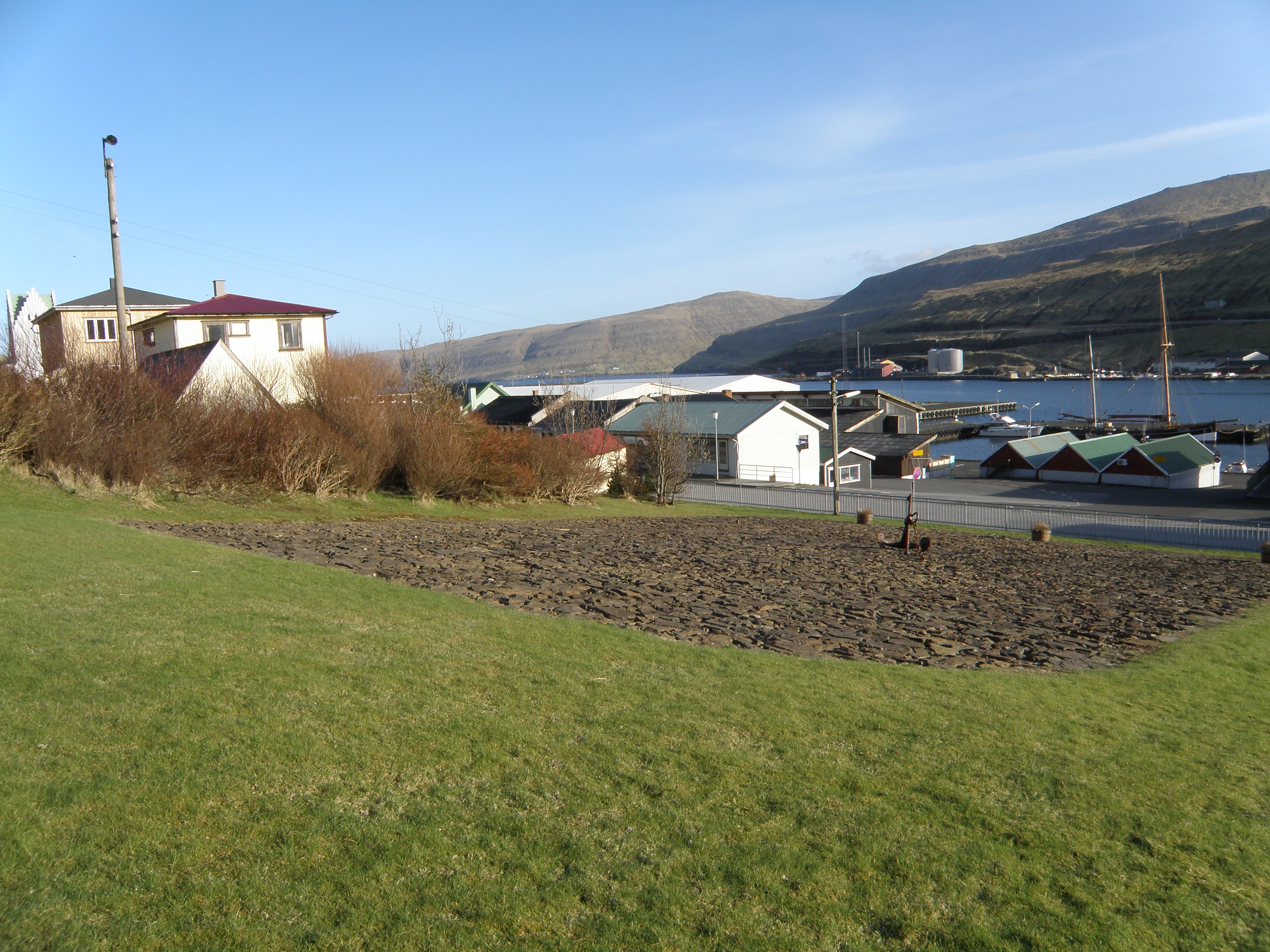
The cod was dried on places like this one in Vágur on Suðuroy. It was laid on the flat rocks.

The Sloop Period Faroese: Slupptíðin is a period in Faroese history, where the Faroese society transformed from a feudal society to a semi-industrial society. The period spans from the 1880s to the beginning of World War II.

== History ==
The name of the period comes from the fact that a lot of Faroese persons bought used sloops, mainly smacks, from the UK, and this gave an uprise in fishery on the islands. A smack is called slupp in Faroese, from the English word sloop. The Faroe Islands got their first fishing fleet. These fishing vessels were fishing from spring to autumn mainly in the waters around Iceland. Faroese women got an opportunity to earn money for the first time, when they went to work in the fish industry onshore, supplied by the sloops. The sloops were fishing cod, which was dried and salted, also known as klippfisk because they were often dried by lying on bare rocks.

There are still two smacks from the Sloop period in the Faroe Islands, which are still sailing, but nowadays mainly for pleasure trips. The smack Johanna TG 326 from Vágur, was built in Rye, East Sussex in 1884, sold to Grimsby in October 1894 and to Jákup Dahl in Vágur on Suðuroy in December 1894. It was in active fishery until 1972. In 1981 it was in very bad shape and sold for 1 DKK to the local fond named after the smack Johanna TG 326. They collected money in order to restore the vessel and they managed to get it back into its original shape. In Tórhavn they have maintained the smack Westward Ho TN 54, which was built in Grimsby in 1884 and sold to T.F. Thomsen in Tvøroyri in Suðuroy in 1894. The name was Westward Ho from the beginning in England until 1895. From 1895 to 1908 it was named Viking, and since 1908 it has been called Westward Ho. Since the smack came to the Faroe Islands it has been fishing in the waters near Faroe Islands, Iceland, Greenland, Jan Mayen, Bear Island (Norway), Rockall.
