= Eastward Hoe =

Stage play by George Chapman, Ben Jonson, and John Marston

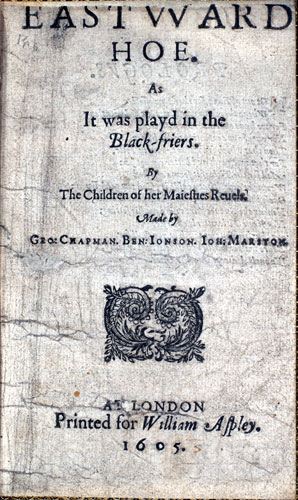
Title page of Eastward Hoe

Eastward Hoe or Eastward Ho! is an early Jacobean-era stage play written by George Chapman, Ben Jonson and John Marston. The play was first performed at the Blackfriars Theatre by a company of boy actors known as the Children of the Queen's Revels in early August 1605, and it was printed in September the same year.

Eastward Ho! is a citizen or city comedy about Touchstone, a London goldsmith, and his two apprentices, Quicksilver and Golding. The play is highly satirical about social customs in early modern London, and its anti-Scottish satire resulted in a notorious scandal in which King James was offended and the play's authors were imprisoned. Eastward Ho! also parodically engages with popular contemporaneous plays such as The Spanish Tragedy, Tamburlaine and Hamlet. The play's title alludes to Westward Ho! by Thomas Dekker and John Webster (who responded with Northward Ho! in 1607).

== Characters ==
- Touchstone, a goldsmith of Cheapside
- Mistress Touchstone, his wife, a gentlewoman
- Gertude, his elder daughter
- Mildred, his younger daughter
- Francis Quicksilver, his prodigal apprentice
- Golding, his dutiful apprentice
- Sindefy, Quicksilver's lover, later employed as Gertrude's maid
- Sir Petronel Flash, a 'thirty pound' knight, engaged to Gertrude
- Captain Seagull, a ship's captain employed by Petronel to Virginia
- Spendall and Scapethrift, adventurers with Captain Seagull
- Drawer, of the Blue Tavern in Billingsgate
- Security, an elderly usurer; bawd to Quicksilver
- Winifred, Security's young wife
- Bramble, a lawyer
- Scrivener
- Poldavy, a tailor
- Bettrice, a lady's maid
- Mistress Fond and Mistress Gazer, city women
- Coachman, to Gertrude
- Hamlet, footman to Gertrude
- Potkin, a tankard bearer
- First Gentleman and Second Gentleman, at the Isle of Dogs
- Wolf, the keeper of the Counter, a prison
- Slitgut, a butcher's apprentice
- Holdfast, a prison guard
- Friend, of the prisoners
- First Prisoner, Second Prisoner (Toby)
- Page, Messenger, Constable, and Officers

== Synopsis ==
=== Act 1 ===
William Touchstone, a London goldsmith, chastises his apprentice Francis "Frank" Quicksilver for his laziness and prodigality. Concerned with his reputation, he tells Quicksilver to consider his actions with the catchphrase, "Work upon that now!" (1.1.10-1). Touchstone also warns Quicksilver against dishonest business and bad company, but Quicksilver remains dismissive and defensive about his way of life. Contrastingly, Touchstone's second apprentice, Golding, is industrious and temperate. Touchstone expresses his great admiration for Golding's uprightness and hopes that Golding will marry Mildred, his mild and modest daughter.

Touchstone's second daughter, Gertrude, is engaged to the fraudulent Sir Petronel Flash, a knight who possesses a title but is bankrupt. Unlike her sister, Gertrude is vain and lascivious, preoccupied with opulent fashion and advancing her social status by marrying Petronel. After reluctantly granting Gertrude's inheritance, Touchstone heartily gives Golding permission to marry Mildred. Anticipating a successful match, Touchstone praises the engaged couple for their virtues.

=== Act 2 ===
The morning after Gertrude and Petronel's costly wedding, Touchstone breaks Quicksilver's apprenticeship and dismisses him for his shameful gluttony and drunkenness. Unperturbed, Quicksilver mocks Touchstone and asserts that he will spend his new freedom going "eastward ho!” (2.1.100-2). Touchstone promotes his new son-in-law, Golding, to a member of the guild.

Quicksilver meets with Security, an old usurer and pander who is married to a young woman named Winifred. Quicksilver devises how he will climb the social ladder and get wealthy without inconvenience or labor. Petronel arrives and expresses his desire to leave London, especially since he cannot tolerate Gertrude or her expensive tastes. He confesses that "all the castles I have are built with air" (2.3.7). Quicksilver persuades Petronel to use Gertrude's dowry to fund their voyage to Virginia.

=== Act 3 ===
Touchstone arrives with Golding and Mildred who are now married. Gertrude pretentiously flaunts her higher rank and disdains her family's lower social status. Once Gertrude unsuspectingly signs away her dowry, Petronel makes hasty preparations to sail to Virginia. Before their departure, Quicksilver and Petronel tell old Security to distract the lawyer Mr. Bramble so they can secretly take Bramble's wife on the voyage. Instead, Quicksilver disguises Winifred and brings her on the ship, fooling Security. Accompanied by Captain Seagull, Petronel and his fellow adventurers set sail for Virginia. They revel in the promise of abundant gold in Virginia and spend the night drinking while Petronel and Quicksilver conceal Winifred's identity from Bramble and Security. Their drunken dancing ends, however, when a storm hits their ship.

=== Act 4 ===
In the confusion of the storm, Security sees Winifred escape with Petronel in a lifeboat, suspecting that she has cheated on him. Separated from Quicksilver and Petronel, Security washes ashore on Cuckold's Haven where he stays in a nearby tavern. Winifred also arrives at the tavern along with Drawer, one of the voyagers.

Shipwrecked and disoriented, Quicksilver and Petronel lament their unfortunate condition. Two passing gentlemen tell them they have arrived on the Isle of Dogs, a northern peninsula in the Thames. Quicksilver tells Petronel and Captain Seagull that he will use his goldsmithing skills to create counterfeit money. Back in the tavern, Winifred lies to Security to cover up her affair with Petronel.

Nearby in London, Golding has been promoted to Master Deputy Alderman. He reports the shipwrecked voyagers have been arrested at Billingsgate for their crimes. Meanwhile, as a result of Petronel's deception, Gertrude sells her opulent clothes and pities her misfortune. Sympathetic towards Gertrude's situation, Mistress Touchstone advises her daughter to seek Mildred's help.

=== Act 5 ===
Brought before Golding and Touchstone, Petronel and Quicksilver admit their guilt in the charges brought against them, including Petronel's dishonest marriage, the dowry deception, and Quicksilver's thievery. Touchstone is appalled and refuses to have mercy on the voyagers. Quicksilver sings a song about his repentance of his schemes and dishonesty, whose change in character and denouncement of vice moves Touchstone to amazement. Golding releases the criminals, including Security, who still laments his cuckoldry. Touchstone reinstates Quicksilver as his apprentice and Petronel as his son-in-law, covering the loss of their possessions and wealth. Gertrude reconciles with Petronel and the play ends happily.

== Authorship and publication ==
Scholars have attempted to determine the respective contributions of the three authors but have not reached a full consensus. Earlier scholars attributed act 1 to Marston, acts 2–3 to Chapman, and act 5 to Jonson. More recently, however, scholars have suggested that the play's authorship was more collaborative, since numerous passages Eastward Ho! evidence more than one author's writing style.

In early September 1605, William Aspley and Thomas Thorp entered Eastward Ho! into the Stationers' Register. The title page features all three authors, Chapman, Jonson and Martson; the playing company who premiered the work, the Children of the Queen's Revels; and the playhouse, Blackfriars Theatre, where the play was first staged. Later in December 1605 and March 1606, George Eld printed more quartos issued by Aspley to meet the high demands for the play. In total, three more print editions of Eastward Ho! were issued within three months of its first publication. The popularity of the play and the looming possibility of censorship may have quickened the publication process. The surviving editions show evidence of deleted lines, missing passages, and altered passages. The censorship may have been issued by the Master of Revels, or his deputy, George Buc, who was also involved in play licensing until 1610. The printed text of 1605 does not represent the full and offensive stage production of that year, though critics have disagreed as to whether the hostile official reaction was provoked more by the stage version or by the text.

== Scandal ==
=== Anti-Scottish satire ===
The following passages in Eastward Ho! exemplify the anti-Scottish sentiment that likely offended Scottish-born King James I:

In Act 1, when Sir Petronel's knighthood is questioned, Mistress Touchstone says, "Yes, that he is a knight! I know where he had money to pay the gentleman ushers and heralds their fees. Ay, that he is a knight!" (1.2.81–2). Mistress Touchstone attributes Sir Pentronel's legitimacy to his purchased title. This line probably satirizes "King James's lavish grants of knighthood." While getting her dress tailored, Gertrude remarks, "Tailor Poldavy, prithee, fit it, fit it: is this a right Scot? Does it clip close, and bear up round?" (1.2.39–40). This remark possibly references the perception that Scots accompanying King James invaded the English Court.

In Act 2, Quicksilver remarks, "[Gertrude] could have been made a lady by a Scotch knight, and never ha' married him" (2.3.68–9). This line references a practice in Scotland where "notorious cohabitation" is accepted as "matrimonial engagement without formal ceremony."

In Act 3, Captain Seagull describes Virginia, the new country that is their destination. While explaining the other inhabitants in the new country, Seagull hints that he wishes for all of the King's Scotsmen to leave England:

"And you shall live freely there ... with only a few industrious Scots, perhaps, who indeed are dispers'd over the face of the whole earth. But, as for them, there are no greater friends to Englishmen and England, when they are out on't, in the world, than they are. And, for my part, I would a hundred thousand of 'em were there, for we are all one countrymen now, ye know; and we should find ten times more comfort of them there than we do here." (3.3.29–35).

These lines particularly angered Sir James Murray and were consequently omitted from the first quarto publication.

In Act 4, when Quicksilver inquires about his whereabouts, he meets the First Gentleman, who has a Scots accent. The First Gentlemen remarks, "I ken [Sir Petronel] well; he is one of my thirty-pound knights" (4.1.140). Like the reference in Act 1, this line mocks King James's selling of knighthoods and granting titles to fellow Scots.

=== Imprisonment ===
After the play's first performances, Jonson and Chapman were imprisoned for offending King James I with satirical Scottish references. In August 1605, when the play premiered, King James I was travelling to Oxford with courtiers including the Lord Chamberlain "whose permission should have been obtained before the comedy was performed." Staging boldly satirical plays without licence had been done before by playing companies, but this instance seems to have gone too far and caused a significant scandal. Jonson later recounted to William Drummond of Hawthornden that he "was delated by Sir James Murray to the king for writing something against the Scots in a play, Eastward Ho, and voluntary imprisoned himself with Chapman and Marston who had written it amongst them. The report was that they should then had their ears cut and noses." Marston was absent, and was not imprisoned with Chapman and Jonson. He may have avoided arrest because of his financial investment in the playing company.

=== Release from prison ===
Between late August and early September, Jonson and Chapman wrote urgent letters to friends, petitioning for their intervention. Among the names addressed in their letters were Earl of Suffolk, Lord Aubigny (the King's cousin Esmé Stuart), Earl of Pembroke, the Lord Chamberlain, the Earl of Salisbury (Robert Cecil), and even King James himself. Chapman's personal correspondences and commendatory poem in the first edition of Jonson's Sejanus (1605) suggest that the Earl of Suffolk was influential in obtaining their release in November 1605. Additionally, Lord Aubigny may have also smoothed the matter through a large financial transaction from Robert Cecil to Sir James Murray, a Scottish knight and favorite courtier of the King, who had been particularly offended at the play's Scottish satire. After his release from prison, Ben Jonson threw a banquet for his friends in celebration.

== Stage history ==
Eastward Ho! was banned from the stage until 1614, when it was revived in a court production by the Lady Elizabeth's Men. Later, in 1685, Nahum Tate revised Eastward Ho! to fit the fashions of Restoration theatre. After David Garrick's 1751 production in London and Charlotte Lennox's 1775 adaption, the play was infrequently performed through the nineteenth century.

In the twentieth century, the play was produced on radio adaptions and university stages, but remained neglected on professional stages. Only three professional productions between 1951 and 1983 were performed by Bernard Miles' original Mermaid Theatre.

The Royal Shakespeare Company revived Eastward Ho! in a production series which featured four other Jacobean plays in 2002. Directed by Lucy Pitman-Wallace, the play was performed at the Swan Theatre in 2002 with a positive critical reception. The play was also produced in 2006 by the American Shakespeare Center in the Blackfriars Playhouse in Staunton, Virginia.

== See also ==
- The Isle of Dogs
- The Isle of Gulls
- The Conspiracy and Tragedy of Charles, Duke of Byron
- A Game at Chess
- The Court Beggar
