= Children of the Chapel =

Choristers who form part of the Chapel Royal

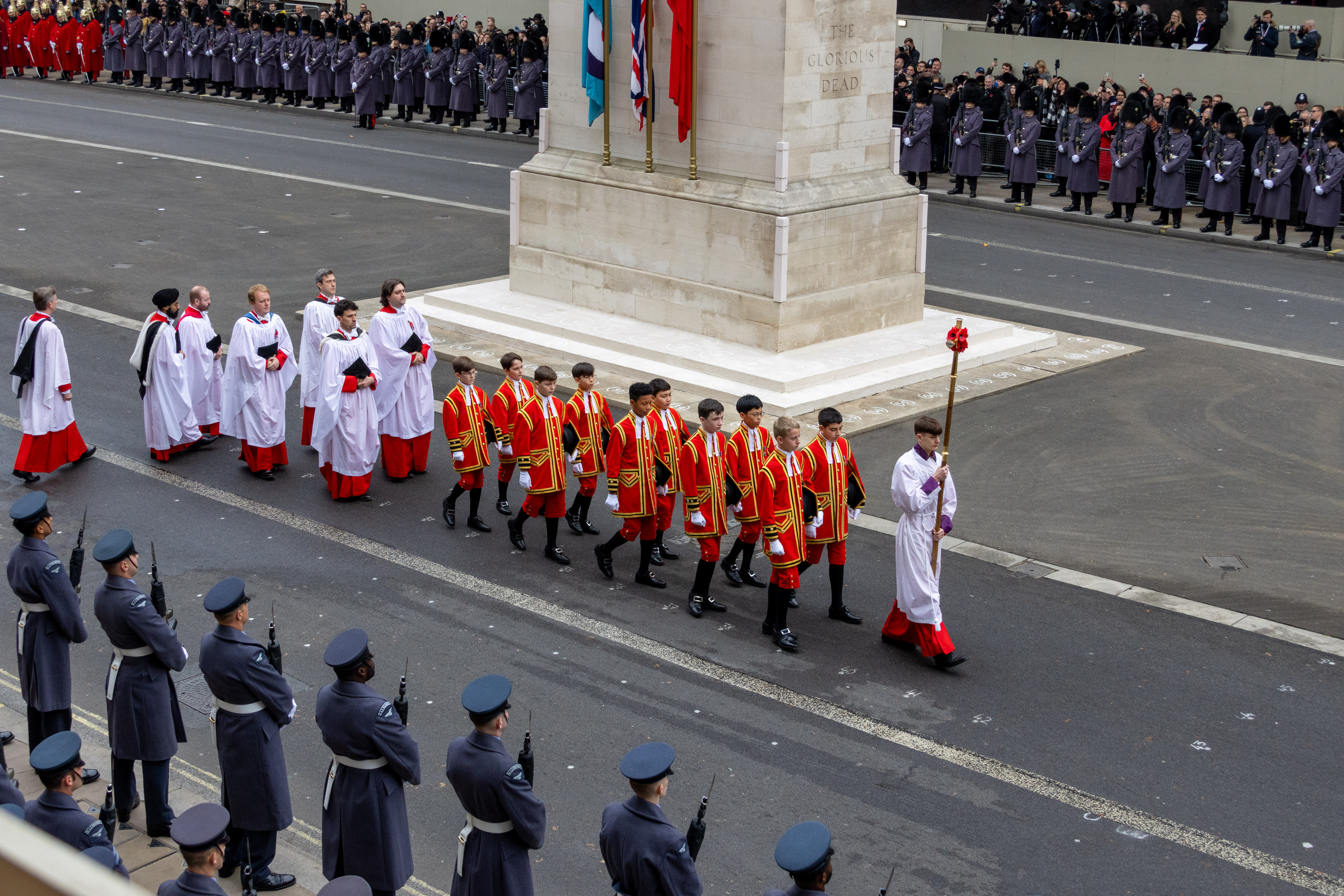
Children of the Chapel in their scarlet uniforms at the National Service of Remembrance at the Cenotaph in London 2024.

The Children of the Chapel, or Children of the Chapel Royal, are a group of boy choristers and actors who form part of the Chapel Royal, the body of singers and priests who perform for the monarchy of the United Kingdom. They were overseen by the Master of the Children of the Chapel Royal.

== The Children of the Chapel Royal ==
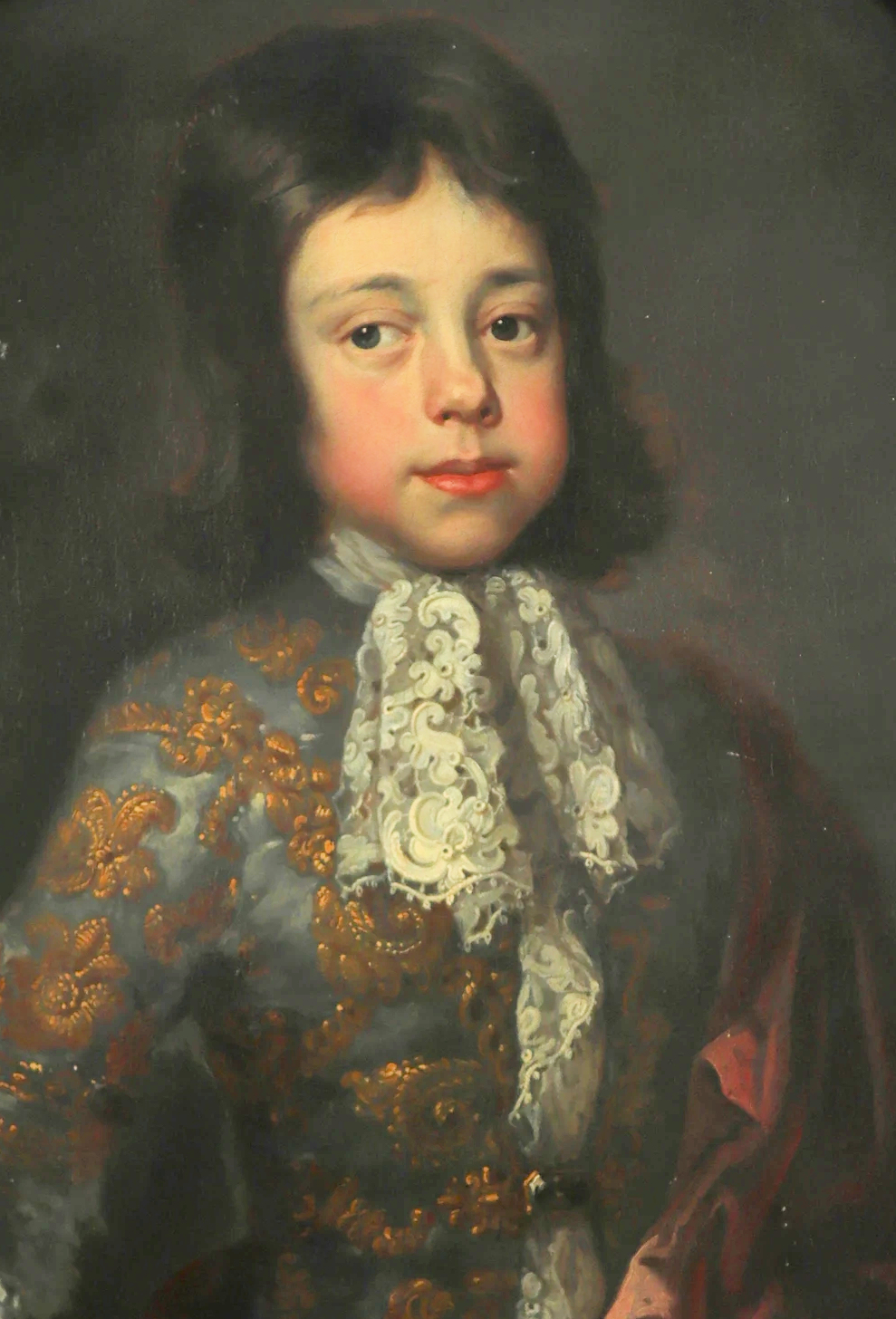
Thomas Edwards was a chorister alongside John Blow and Michael Wise following the restoration of the monarchy in 1660. He later became servant to Samuel Pepys.

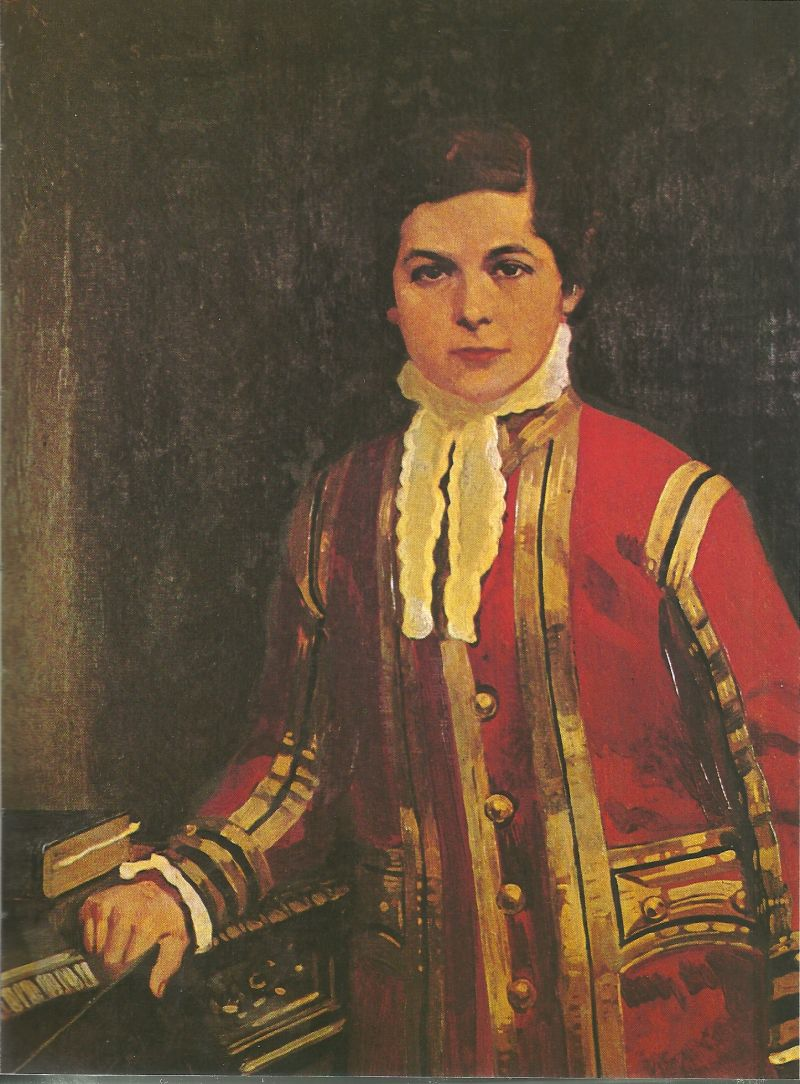
Arthur Sullivan aged 13 when he was a chorister of the Chapel Royal, wearing the State Dress

Sometime in the 12th century or earlier, a distinct establishment known as the Chapels Royal was created within the English Royal Court. Its musical establishment now claims to be the oldest continuous musical organization in the world. Children sang in church because their high voices were considered closest to the angels, and Queen Elizabeth desired entertainment and care for her “spiritual well being”. Boy groups from grammar school and choir school, ages 7–14, were royally patronized to perform songs for the queen and her court.

The choir now has just ten boys. They wear the distinctive state uniform that was introduced during the Restoration. Their special school within St James's Palace no longer operates, having closed in 1923; the boys all attend the City of London School and receive a choral scholarship from the king. In the past, when the boys were educated within the court, they were very much a part of court life and were entitled to many small special privileges.

The Choir's duties are to sing the regular services in the chapel of the Monarch's home and to otherwise attend as commanded. It is based in the two chapels of St James's Palace, and services are also sung in the chapels of Kensington and Buckingham Palaces. The Choir also takes part in many State and National ceremonies and at private events within the Royal Household. It consists of six Gentlemen in Ordinary, ten choristers, and a Sub-Organist.

At the coronation of Charles III and Camilla in 2023, one of the children of the Choir was chosen to give a welcoming address to the new King.

=== The troupes of child actors ===
The Children of the Chapel, (Note: If from the establishment of the Chapels Royal also known as the Children of His Majesty's Chapel Royal, the Children of the Chapel Royal, the Children of the Queen's Revels, the Children of the Revels) the Children of the Blackfriars Theatre, and the Children of the Whitefriars Theatre were troupes of child actors in Elizabethan and Jacobean England. The beginning of court performances dates back to the start of Elizabeth I's reign in England in 1558. Elizabeth I was the daughter of Henry VIII and Anne Boleyn. She came into power the day that her older sister Mary died, and took over rule of England almost immediately after. This became the start of the Elizabethan era and was known for its influx of appreciation and recognition of the arts. The performances themselves started off as mainly choir concerts, but later became more musical and performative, and incorporated masks for costumes. The Queen was insistent on making sure the children mastered other skills, such as art, theatre, and various musical instruments, to enhance their talent and develop the quality of the performances as time went on.

By the accession of James I in 1603, the Chapels Royal was staffed by a dean, a sub-dean, and 32 gentlemen (both priests and laymen. It also had a choir of 12 boys. The age range for the group was never set in stone, but generally the boys would join around age 6, and would continue in the group up into their mid 20s. Although the older members were technically no longer children, they were not kicked out, and instead the overall number of boys grew. William Cornysh, who was Master of the Children from 1509 to 1523, first began the practice of having the boys' choir perform dramatic interludes at Court. William Hunnis was Master of the Children of the Chapel from 1566 to 1597; under his stewardship the boys played repeatedly at Court until 1584.

In 1576 (the same year James Burbage built The Theatre and began the era of popular Elizabethan drama), the land in which the theater was on, which was initially owned by Sir William, was negotiated on by Burbage so that the Chamberlain's Men would have a theater to perform in. The area was founded by the Dominican Friars in 1278 and bordered the River Thames near London. It was known for being a self-governing area, mainly to escape control and power of the city's mayor. Burbage bought out the first floor hall of the Upper Frater of the theater which would be turned into the Blackfriar Playhouse. Hunnis's deputy Richard Farrant rented space in the old Blackfriars priory, and began public performances by the boys. For unknown reasons, the troupe did not act at Court after 1584, though they did give some performances outside London. When the Children of Paul's were suppressed in 1590, due to their playwright John Lyly's role in the Marprelate controversy, child actor troupes went out of fashion for the next decade, and this inevitably affected the Children of the Chapel.

(When Marlowe's Dido, Queen of Carthage was published in 1594, it was described as "Played by the Children of Her Majesty's Chapel." The uncertainty of that play's date clouds the question of when those performances occurred.)

In 1600 the Children of the Chapel returned to the public stage with regular performances. Nathaniel Giles, their Master from 1597 to 1634, became one of the lessees (with Henry Evans) of the Blackfriars Theatre that James Burbage built in 1596, and brought the Children to play there. The boys performed at Court on 6 January and 22 February 1601. They had a big hit that year with Ben Jonson's The Poetaster. Nathan Field, John Underwood, and William Ostler, all of whom would later join the King's Men, were in the cast.

Even in the early years of this period, the Children of the Chapel were mired in controversy. Giles drafted, and sometimes nearly kidnapped, boys that he wanted in his troupe. (He had a legal right to use such techniques – but only for the boys' choir, not for acting.) Solomon Pavy, the young actor eulogized by Ben Jonson upon his premature death in 1603, was one boy "pressed" into service in this way. Nathan Field was another. In one instance, a man named Henry Clifton brought a complaint before the Star Chamber in December 1601, maintaining that Giles had kidnapped Clifton's young son Thomas while the boy was walking home from grammar school. (Giles was censured, and Clifton got his son back.)

The Children of the Chapel performed plays by Jonson, George Chapman, John Marston, Thomas Middleton, and others during the next several years. They specialised in the satirical comedy that appealed to Court wits and a "Gentle" audience, in contrast to the more popularly oriented drama of William Shakespeare, Thomas Heywood, Thomas Dekker, and similar writers. The company experienced popularity and success in the first years of the century; when the House of Stuart inherited the monarchy, the Children of the Chapel, like other troupes of actors, received royal favor – they became the Children of the Queen's Revels (1603–5). They tried tragedies and tragicomedies, but most of their success came from satirical comedies. Company performances became a regular staple for the court and began to be performed by both children and adult companies, so much so that they occurred annually at the winter revelry, which was a large festive gathering full of drinking and loud festivities.

Yet they also experienced the downside of this brand of drama: when the play Eastward Hoe (1605) won official censure and landed two of its authors, Jonson and Chapman, in jail, the actors earned a share of the disapproval. They lost their Royal patent, and became simply the Children of the Revels (1605–6). After another scandal, this one involving The Isle of Gulls by John Day (1606), they were known as the Children of the Blackfriars. They managed to offend the King a third time, in 1608, in regard to their production of George Chapman's two-part play The Conspiracy and Tragedy of Charles, Duke of Byron. The double play offended the French Ambassador, who got it banned from the stage. (The Ambassador was particularly bothered by a scene in which the French Queen slaps the face of the King's mistress – a scene that was omitted from the printed texts of the plays.) When the Court was not in London, however, the Children of the Blackfriars performed the plays again, in their original offensive form. The angry James swore that the boys "should never play more but should first beg their bread." Yet the King liked plays too much to maintain this resolve over the long term, and the Children were eventually able to continue. They even performed at Court the following Christmas season.

Also in 1608, the King's Men took over the lease of the Blackfriars Theatre, effectively evicting the previous tenants. The children's company moved to the new Whitefriars Theatre, and became, perforce, the Children of the Whitefriars (1609). In 1610, however, they regained royal favour, due to the influence of Philip Rosseter, lutenist to the Royal household and their new manager; they were the Children of the Queen's Revels once again.

The company performed Jonson's Epicene in 1609; in 1611 they acted Nathan Field's A Woman is a Weathercock, both at Whitefriars and at Court. Field was in the cast of both productions. They played at Court four times in 1612–13, performing plays by Beaumont and Fletcher. For a time around 1613, the boys' troupe was linked with the Lady Elizabeth's Men. After losing their Whitefriars lease at the end of 1614, they moved to Rosseter's short-lived Porter's Hall Theatre (1615). The last play they are known to have acted was Beaumont and Fletcher's The Scornful Lady. The company apparently collapsed around 1616.

A warrant, granted in 1626 to Nathaniel Giles to take up singing boys for the service of the Chapel Royal, contained a proviso that the children so to be taken should not be employed as comedians or stage-players, or act in stage plays, interludes, comedies, or tragedies, "for that it is not fitt or decent that such as sing the praises of God Almighty should be trained or imployed on such lascivious and prophane exercises."

== See also ==
- Hugh Atwell, one of the "Children of her Majesty's Revels"

== Sources ==
- Chambers, E. K. The Elizabethan Stage. 4 Volumes, Oxford, Clarendon Press, 1923.
- Halliday, F. E. A Shakespeare Companion 1564–1964. Baltimore, Penguin, 1964.
- Ioppolo, Grace. Dramatists and Their Manuscripts in the Age of Shakespeare, Jonson, Middleton, and Heywood. London, Routledge, 2006.
- Munro, Lucy. Children of the Queen's Revels: A Jacobean Theatre Repertory. Cambridge, Cambridge University Press, 2005.
