= Nymph in a Landscape =

Painting by Palma Vecchio

- Resting Venus
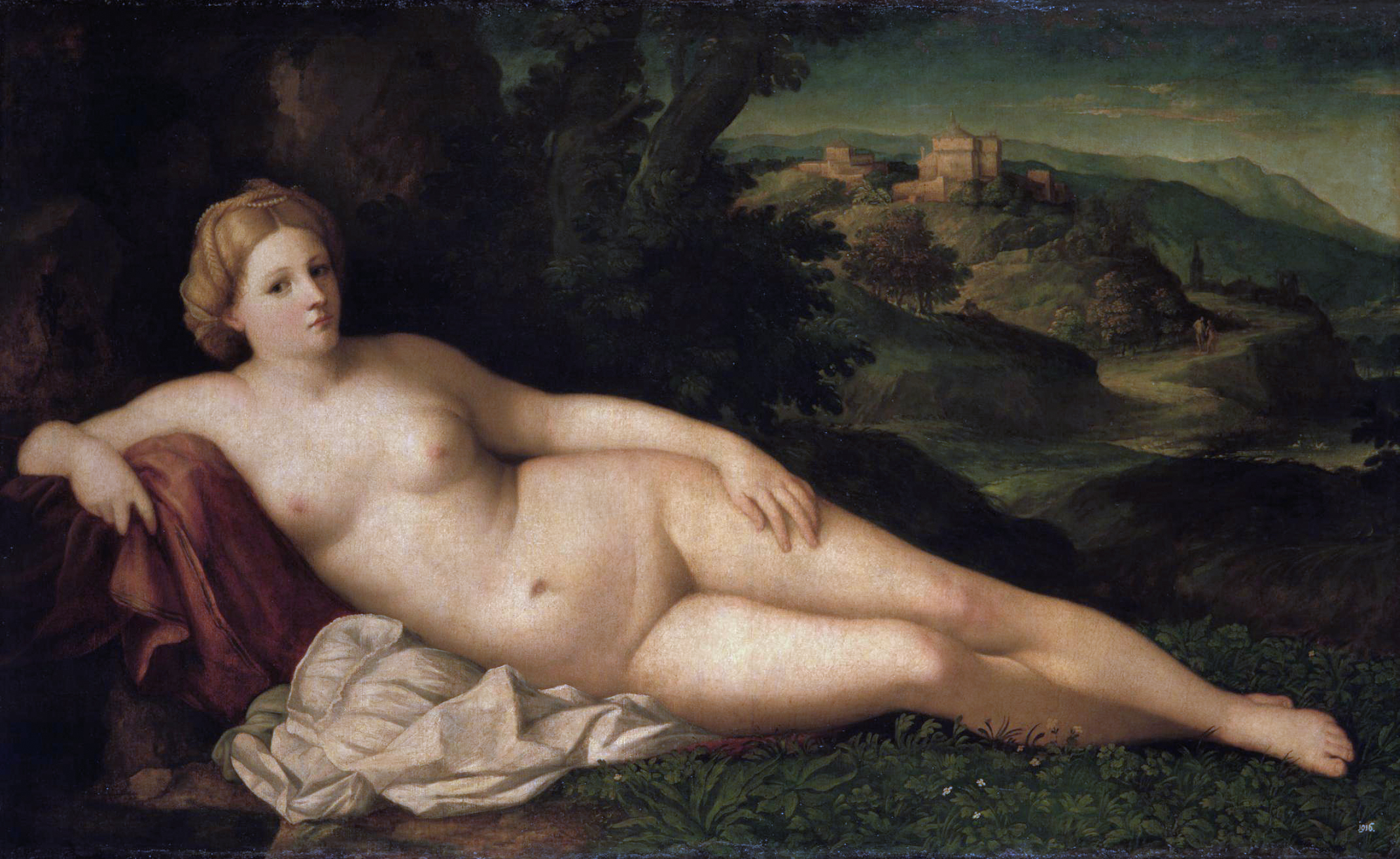
- Artist: Palma Vecchio

Nymph in a Landscape or Resting Venus is a c. 1518–1520 oil on canvas painting by Palma Vecchio, now in the Gemäldegalerie, Dresden. Its iconography derives from the Sleeping Venus by Giorgione, also now in Dresden.

== History and description ==
The painting derives iconographically from Giorgione's Venus of Dresden, in a way so that some have even identified it as representing a reclined Venus. In fact, it seems that this work was more inspired by some literary works of the early 16th century, in particular the messages contained in moralizing works such as Gli Asolani by Pietro Bembo. This work speaks of women who in the ancient world were considered like wood nymphs, capable of enchanting men with a single glance, and dragging them into a world of joys, but also of pains of love. Hence the languid and sensual body of the woman, completely naked and awake, without even a gesture of modesty as in Titian's Venus of Urbino, seems to be an obstacle to the winding road that can be seen in the landscape, as a symbol of moral elevation.
