= Saint Helena Altarpiece =

Painting by Jacopo Palma il Vecchio

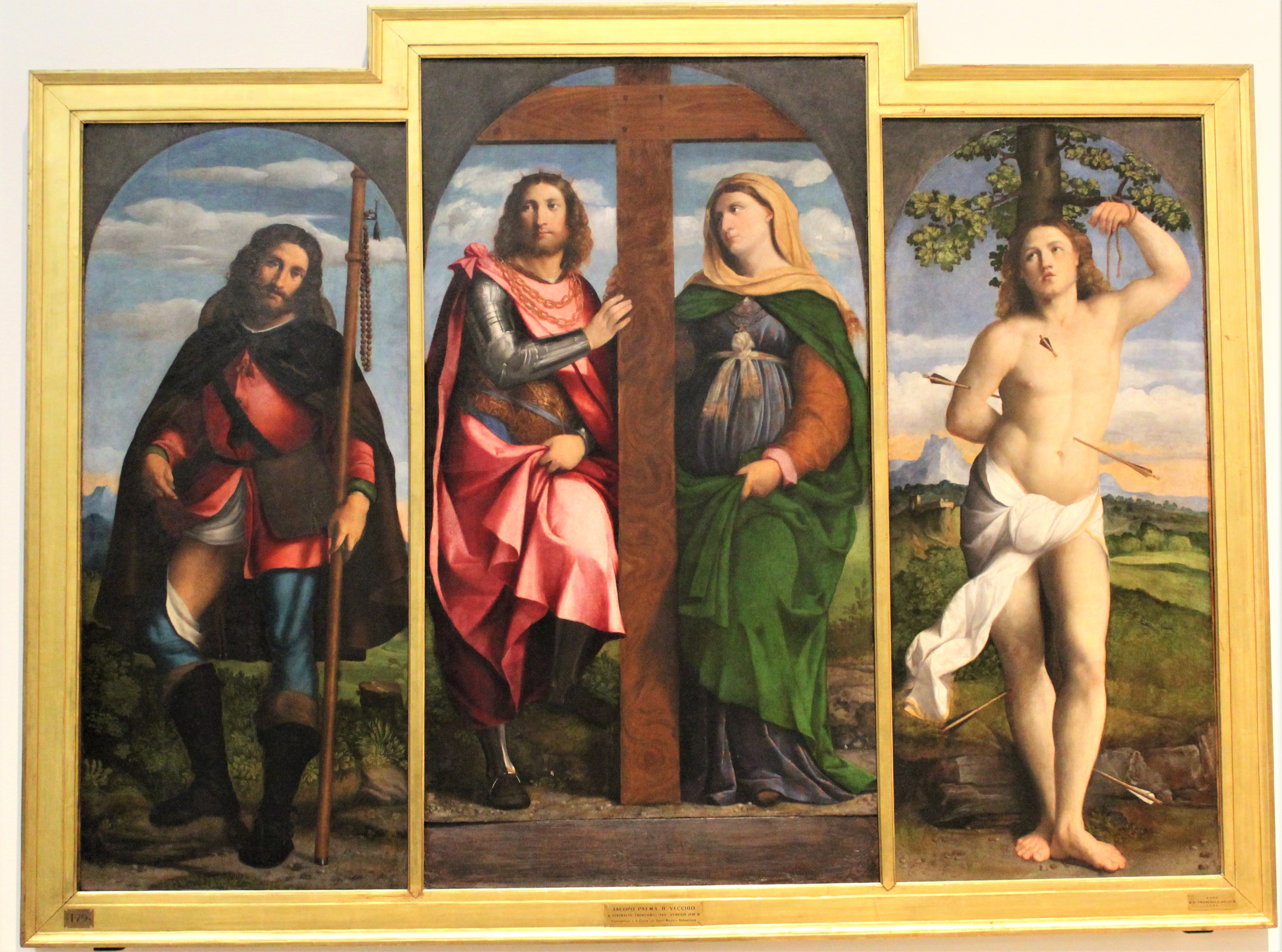
Saint Helena Altarpiece (c. 1524–1525) by Palma Vecchio

The Saint Helena Altarpiece is a three-panelled oil on panel painting by Jacopo Palma il Vecchio, created c. 1524–1525, now in the Pinacoteca di Brera in Milan.

From left to right it depicts Saint Roch, emperor Constantine the Great, the True Cross, Constantine's mother Saint Helena and Saint Sebastian.
