= Gerolamo Accoramboni =

Italian physician

Gerolamo Accoramboni (also known as: Hieronymus Acorombonus Eugubius) is an Italian physician born in Gubbio in Umbria on February 1469 and died in Rome on 21 February 1537.

== Personal life ==
Fourth son of Giovanni Filippo Accoramboni, he married Agnese Ubaldini with whom he had several children including:

- Fabio, jurist at the University of Padua.
- Claudio who married Tarquinia Paluzzi Albertoni in 1549: they had eleven children including Vittoria Accoramboni (1557-1585) whose life will inspire Stendhal (Vittoria Accoramboni) and John Webster (The White Devil).

== Professional life ==
He completed his studies of philosophy at the University of Perugia. In 1496, he was philosophy reader in Padua with Antonio Fracanzano as his master: it is possible that his Tractatus proportionalitatum Domini Antonii Fracantiani Vicentini was in fact by Accoramboni.

From 1505 to 1515, he filled the first chair of medicine at the academy of Perugia, and already his reputation attracted to his classes pupils from all over Italy.

In 1513, his compatriots deputed him as ambassador of Gubbio to Rome for the election of Pope Leo X. From 1514, while keeping his post in Perugia, he taught theoretical medicine in Rome until 1515.

In 1515, Pope Leo X invited him to Rome and appointed him his physician and gave him a professorship in the Sapienza University of Rome, a post he held until the death of Leo X in 1521. He was doctor to the following two popes: Adrian VI and Clement VII. He cured the future Cardinal Pietro Bembo of a serious illness and entered into controversy with another doctor of the Pope, Bartolomeo da Pisa, about a book that the latter wrote against him in 1519: Apologia quorumdam a se dictorum and ab Hieronymo de Eugubio impugnatorum, cum clara declaratione illorum Avicennae verborum quorum fuit contentio.

But Accoramboni was not to enjoy the fortune he had acquired by his talents: in the sack of Rome, in 1527, by the mutinous troops of Charles V, Holy Roman Emperor, his house was entirely devastated. He could not even save his manuscripts. In the embarrassment in which he found himself, Accoramboni hastened to accept the chair of medicine of the Academy of Padua, which he had refused several times. His treatment, fixed at first at 760 gold ecus, was increased, as early as the following year, to 800 ecus.

Pope Paul III having appointed him his physician, he returned to Rome, in September 1536, but some time afterwards he fell ill and died.

== Homonym ==
There is a “Gerolamo Accoramboni”, uncle of Antonio Benevoli, professor of surgery in Florence. But the latter was born in 1685 in Castello delle Preci in the Duchy of Spoleto.

== Works ==
- Tractatvs De Pvtredinae Excellentissimi Philosophi Et Medici cinsumatissimi. D. Hieronymi Acoramboni Eugubij ordinarij practicae medicinae in gymnasio Patauino (in Latin). de Ariuabenis. 1534.
- Tractatus de catarrho (in Latin). 1536.
- Tractatus de Lacte (in Latin). Petreius. 1538.
- Tractatus de natura et usu lactis (in Latin). 1538.
