= Holy Family with the Infant Saint John the Baptist and Saint Mary Magdalene =

Painting by Palma Vecchio

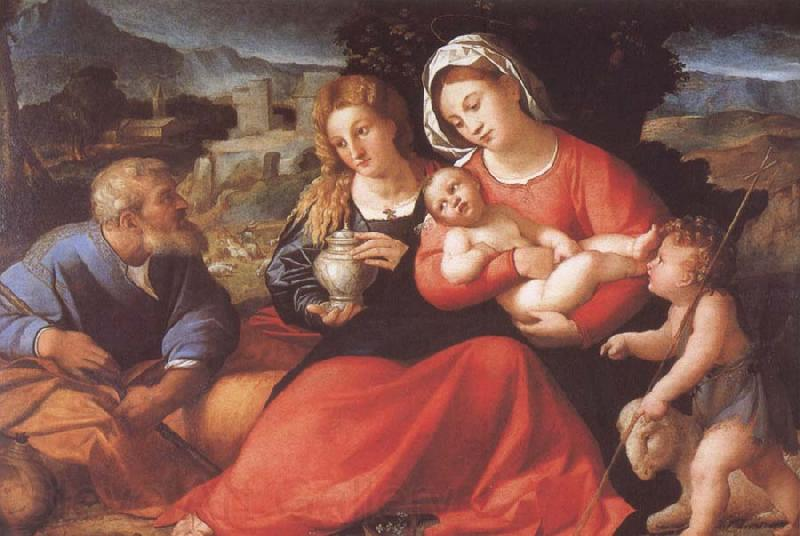
Holy Family with the Infant Saint John the Baptist and Saint Mary Magdalene (1508–1512) by Palma Vecchio

Holy Family with the Infant Saint John the Baptist and Saint Mary Magdalene is a 1508–1512 oil-on-panel painting by the Venetian painter Palma Vecchio. It was in archduke Leopold William of Austria's collection in Brussels from 1653 to 1662 before being moved to the Imperial Galleries in Vienna (now the Kunsthistorisches Museum), before finally being exchanged for another work with the Uffizi in Florence in 1793, where it is now inventory number 950.

It was stored for safety in the villa medicea di Poggio a Caiano from 1940 to 1942, before being moved from bomb shelter to bomb shelter until 1944. The German occupiers then seized it and other works from the Uffizi, taking them to the Castel Giovo in the Province of Bolzano, intending to take all the works they had looted from the Uffizi to Germany. It was returned to the Palazzo Pitti in 1945 then back to the Uffizi in 1951. It was restored in 1988 and 2003–2004.

Bernard Berenson proposed that the painting was done in collaboration with the Palma il Vecchio workshop.

== Frame ==
The painting is placed in an elaborate baroque frame of carved, gilded and painted wood, with laurel leaf decorations. An engraving after the painting by Jan van Troyen was included in the Theatrum Pictorium, published in Antwerp in 1660 by the painter David Teniers the Younger. It was a collection of 243 engravings by various artists, taken from paintings belonging to Archduke Leopold Wilhelm of Austria. From this engraving it is evident that the painting was originally taller and wider than it is now.

Another engraving was made of it by Giovanni Paolo Lasinio, which was published in 1828.

== Bibliography ==
- (in Italian) Galleria degli Uffizi: catalogo dei dipinti, Firenze, Giannini, 1926, SBN IT\ICCU\UBO\3026951.
- (in German) A. Spahn, Palma Vecchio, Leipzig, Hiersemann, 1932, SBN IT\ICCU\PUV\0292802.
- (in German) György Gombosi, Palma il Vecchio, München, Bruckmann, 1935, SBN IT\ICCU\LUA\0522653.
- (in Italian) Bernard Berenson, 'La scuola veneta', in Pitture italiane del Rinascimento: elenco dei principali artisti e delle loro opere con un indice dei luoghi, Firenze-London, Sansoni-Phaidon Press, 1958, SBN IT\ICCU\RAV\0057528.
- (in Italian) Giovanni Mariacher, Palma il Vecchio, Milano, Bramante, 1968, SBN IT\ICCU\SBL\0098552.
- (in Italian) Gallerie degli Uffizi, Gli Uffizi: Catalogo generale, Firenze, Centro Di, 1980, p. 398 [1979], SBN IT\ICCU\RAV\0060995.
- (in Italian) Philip Rylands, Palma il Vecchio: l'opera completa, Milano, A. Mondadori, 1988, SBN IT\ICCU\LO1\0021755.
- (in Italian) Giovanni C. F. Villa (ed.), Palma il Vecchio: Lo sguardo della bellezza, Milano, Skira, 2015
