= Judith (Palma Vecchio) =

Painting attributed to Palma Vecchio

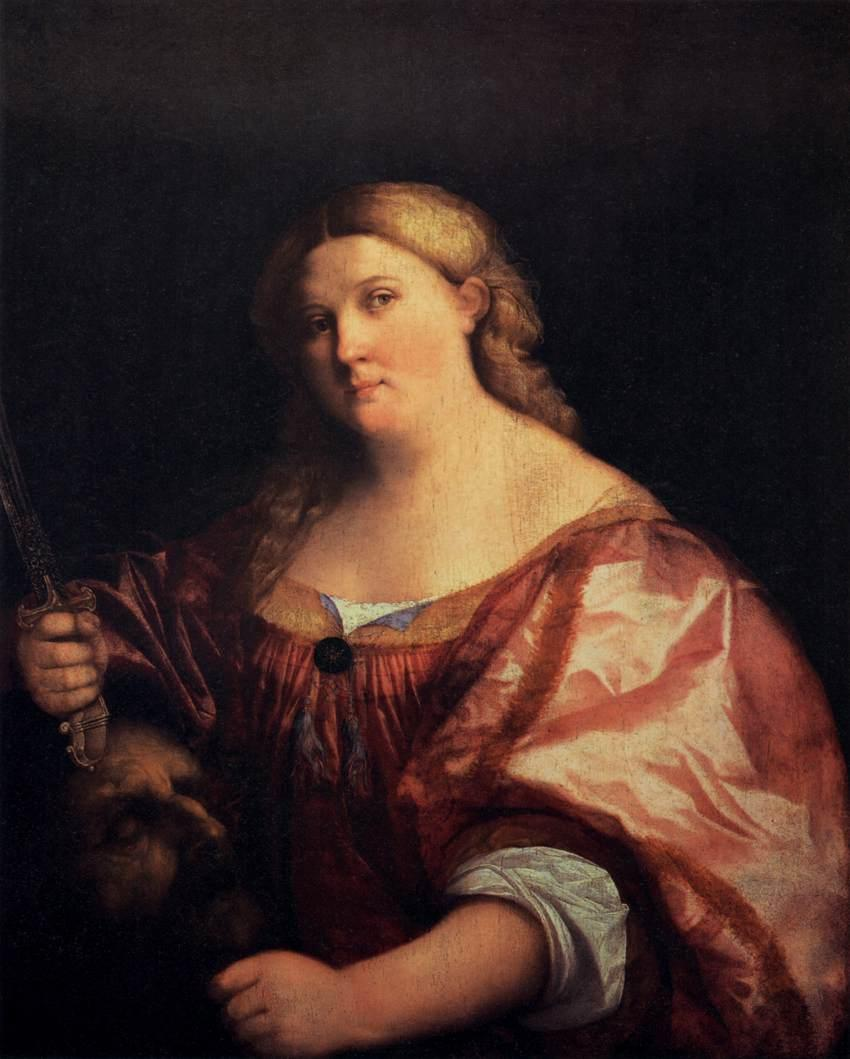
Judith (1525-1528) by Palma Vecchio

Judith is an oil on panel painting, attributed to Palma Vecchio, and created in 1525-1528. It is held in the Uffizi, in Florence. (Note: Inventory number: 939. Restored in 1988) The attribution to Palma Vecchio was questioned in the past but is now usually accepted. Art historians Giovanni Battista Cavalcaselle and Joseph Archer Crowe have attributed it to Palma Vecchio, also identifying damage from heavy-handed cleaning, especially on the head of Holofernes. This attribution has been confirmed by György Gombosi and Giovanni Mariacher, who identified it as a mature work of that artist.

== History ==
The painting is now exhibited in a later baroque frame with gold leaf gilding. The work was originally in the Della Rovere collection at the Ducal Palace, Urbino. Attributed to both Titian and Palma there, it remained in that collection from 1526 to 1631, after which it entered the Medici collection following Vittoria della Rovere's marriage to Ferdinando II de' Medici, Grand Duke of Tuscany. He placed it in the 'Guardaroba' of the Palazzo Pitti before in 1798 moving to the Uffizi, where it was attributed to Pordenone.

It was kept in the villa medicea di Poggio a Caiano from 1940 to 1944, after which the Germans stole it with other paintings and sculptures and moved them to the Castel Giovo (San Leonardo in Passiria) (Bolzano), intending to take them to Germany. It was instead returned to Florence in 1945, initially to the Museo degli Argenti in the Palazzo Pitti and then in 1951 the Uffizi.

== Exhibition history ==
- 2011 - Dante Gabriel Rossetti, Edward Burne-Jones e il mito dell'Italia nell'Inghilterra vittoriana, Roma.
- 2015 - Palma il Vecchio. Lo sguardo della bellezza, Bergamo.

== Bibliography ==
- (in Italian) Gallerie degli Uffizi, Gli Uffizi: Catalogo generale, Firenze, Centro Di, 1980, p. 398 [1979], SBN IT\ICCU\RAV\0060995.
- (in Italian) Philip Rylands, Palma il Vecchio: l'opera completa, Milano, A. Mondadori, 1988, SBN IT\ICCU\LO1\0021755.
- (in Italian) Giovanni C. F. Villa (ed.), Palma il Vecchio: Lo sguardo della bellezza, Milano, Skira, 2015,
