= Presentation of the Virgin Altarpiece =

Painting by Palma Vecchio

The Presentation of the Virgin Altarpiece is a c. 1515-1517 oil on panel altarpiece by Palma Vecchio, now in the church of Santa Maria Annunziata in Serina, Lombardy, the painter's birthplace.

The work was originally commissioned by the congregation of the Most Holy Rosary for its altarpiece. It was then kept in the sacristy for a time. A restoration in 2015 funded by Credito Bergamasco restored its original colours and rebuilt the bottom of the frame to its original 16th century form - it was carried out by Eugenia De Beni and Leone Algisi, managed by Dr Marina Gargiulo, Soprintendenza ai Beni Storici, Artistici e Etnoantropologici di Milano.

The central panel shows the Presentation of the Virgin below a half-length of Saint Joseph. The two left hand side panels show Saint Apollonia and Saint Philip, whilst the two right hand ones show Blessed Alberto and Francis of Assisi.
