= Holy Family with Saint John the Baptist and Saint Catherine =

Painting by Palma Vecchio and Titian

Holy Family with Saint John the Baptist and Saint Catherine (c. 1520-1525) by Palma Vecchio

Holy Family with Saint John the Baptist and Saint Catherine is a c. 1520-1528 oil on canvas painting by Palma Vecchio, now in the Gallerie dell'Accademia in Venice. It was completed by Titian after Palma's death.

== History ==
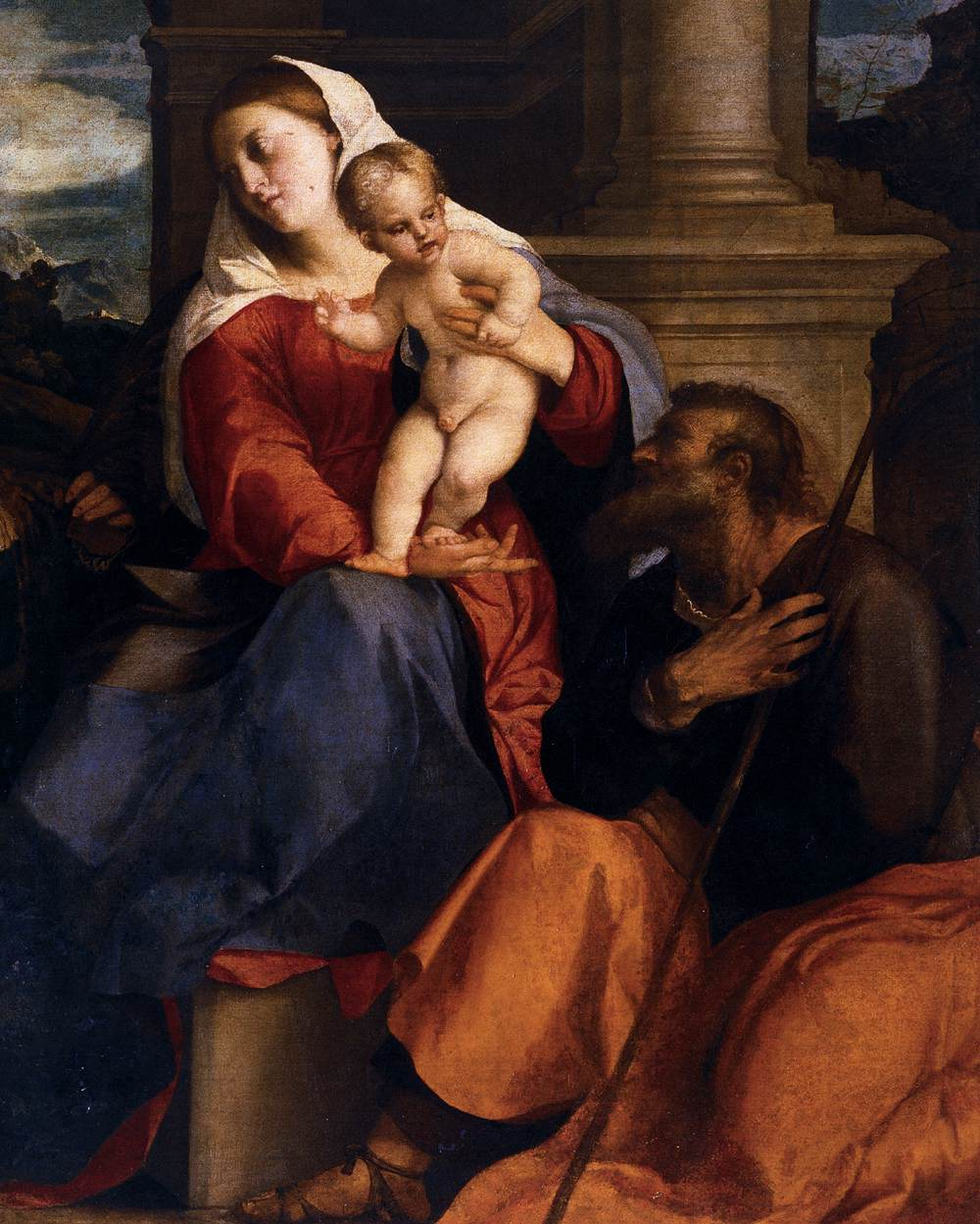
Detail

Commissioned by the Querini (an old Venetian family), it appeared in the catalogue of works still in Palma's studio upon his death under the title Flight into Egypt. It was owned by Widmann then Passamano before in 1900 being acquired for its present owner by the art dealer Alessandro Bedendo with Palma's Saint Jerome Meditating.
