= Madonna and Child with Donors =

Painting by Palma Vecchio

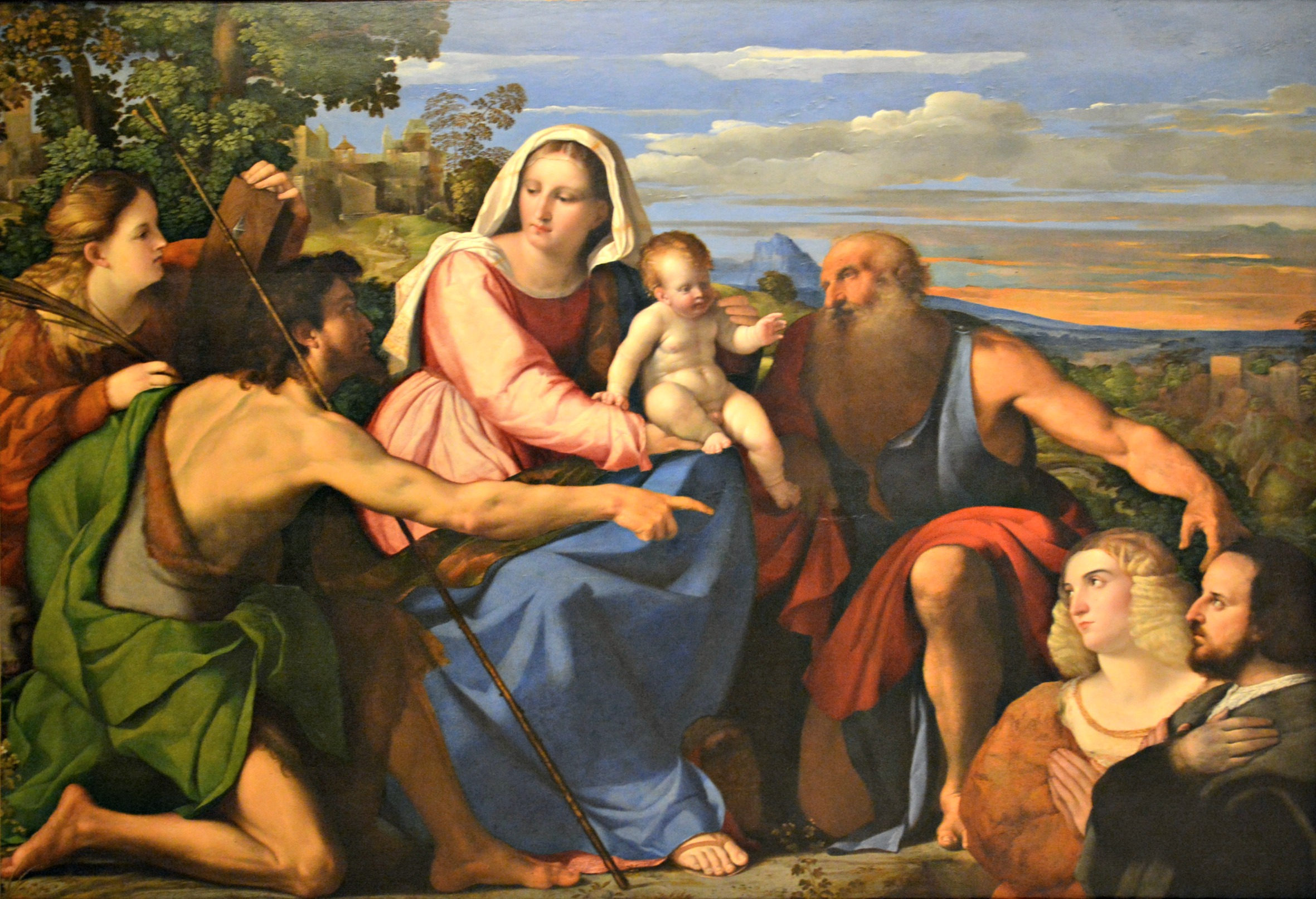
Madonna and Child with Donors (c. 1525) by Palma Vecchio

Madonna and Child with Donors or Sacred Conversation with Donors is a c. 1525 oil on panel painting by Palma Vecchio, now in the Museo nazionale di Capodimonte in Naples.

== History ==
As well as the Madonna and Child in the centre and the unknown donors at bottom right, it also shows Catherine of Alexandria and John the Baptist at left and Saint Jerome to the right. The work is recorded with its attribution to Palma in the collection of Domenico Barbaja, a music and theatre impresario active in Naples between 1809 and 1840. In 1841 Naples' royal family bought the work and seventeen others from the sale of Barbaja's collection, upon which it entered its present home.
