= Portrait of a Courtesan =

Painting by Palma Vecchio

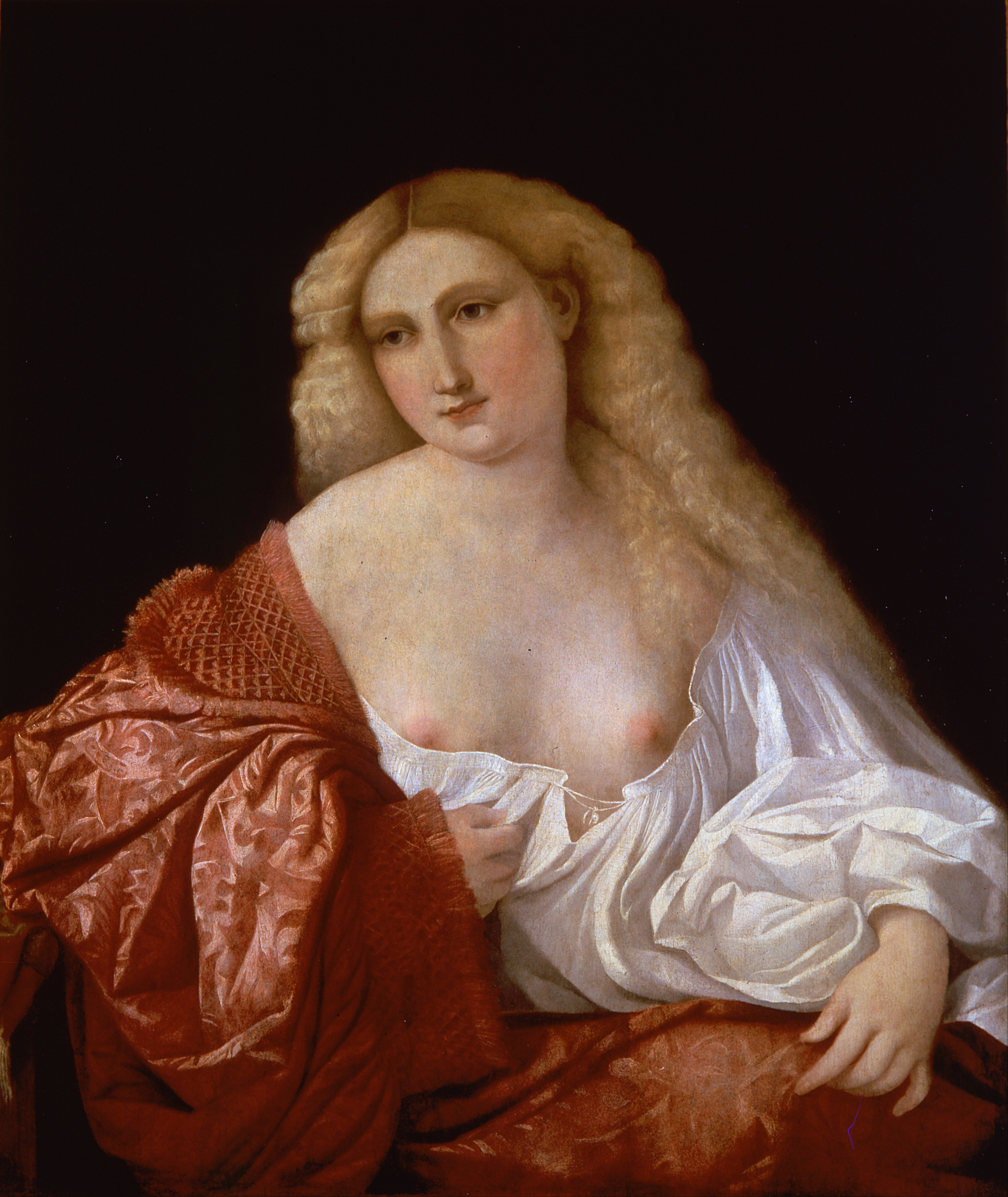
Portrait of a Courtesan (c. 1520) by Palma Vecchio

Portrait of a Courtesan or Portrait of a Woman is an oil on canvas painting by Palma Vecchio, from c. 1520. It is held in the Museo Poldi Pezzoli, in Milan.

== History ==
Probably produced during the artist's Venetian period, it was acquired by count Gian Giacomo Poldi Pezzoli for his new collection in 1865 as a work by Giorgione from the art dealer Terzaghi of Milan, without any earlier provenance. It was restored in the 19th century by Giuseppe Molteni and Luigi Cavenaghi and in 1951 by[Mauro Pellicioli.
