= Gli Asolani =

Dialogues in 3 books by Pietro Bembo

- Author: Pietro Bembo
- Language: Italian
- Subject: Love
- Genre: Dialogue
- Publisher: Aldus Manutius
- Publication date: 1505
- Publication place: Venice
- Media type: Print

Gli Asolani (the people of Asolo) are dialogues in three books written between 1497 and 1504 by Pietro Bembo in the language of Petrarch and comprise his first important work. Although he had shown a copy to Lucrezia Borgia in 1503, the first edition from 1505 was published by Aldo Manuzio (Aldus Manutius), and the second edition was published, after various revisions, in 1530. They concern a dialogue on love that is supposed to have happened at Asolo near the court of Caterina Cornaro.

== Structure and personages ==
- Libro I – Perottino: the unfortunate lover who expresses love's negativity via psychophysiological analyses – playing on the words amore (love) and amaro (bitter) "he argues that love is bitter, that all love causes bitterness, and that all bitterness proceeds from love"
- Libro II – Gismondo: the fortunate lover who refutes Perottino's thesis by expounding love's positivity
- Libro III – Lavinello: who refutes both Perottino and Gismondo by supporting the theory of Platonic love – contemplating the beautiful ideal present in earthly things; Kidwell summarises this as "In short, good love is that which one can enjoy eternally and bad that which condemns us eternally to grief"

== Renaissance renewal of classical humanism ==
As an ecclesiastic, a writer such as Pietro Bembo was not solely interested in temporal pursuits: his perspective was a transcendent one. He is credited with developing the flow-chart like mental associations that illustrate the relationship of law and order, the degree of agreement (or not) in the human soul with virtues' source Divine Love, depicted poetically in Dante's Divine Comedy. God's liberality precedes all moral action, an important aspect to be recalled in critiques of the excesses of the papacy under the Borgia's. The work is dedicated to Lucrezia Borgia, her later notoriety perhaps preventing a wider readership, becoming available in English translation as late as 1954, see below.

== Later influences ==
The romantic poet Robert Browning credits Cardinal Bembo with coining the poeticism "asolare" upon which he based his last work "Asolando" published posthumously in 1890.

"...a titlename popularly ascribed to the inventiveness of the ancient secretary of Queen Cornaro whose palace-tower still overlooks us: Asolare—" to disport in the open air, amuse oneself at random." The objection that such a word nowhere occurs in the works of the Cardinal is hardly important— Bembo was too thorough a purist to conserve in print a term which in talk he might possibly toy with..."

Indeed, Bembo's anthropology of human love as divine gift reconciling fallen man to his neighbor (rather than primitive psychological strife in the battle of the sexes) represents an early instance in the development of Christian metaphysics towards an understanding of the experience of human persons in mutual relationship with each other. This romantic or conjugal meaning of the body as sign of the Transcendent, reflects the mystery of Divine Love found in human sexual love. As icons of the Trinity, the integral, inseparable nature of the human body and soul reaches its fullest understanding much later in the phenomenological personalism of Karol Wojtyla, and his teachings on the theology of the body. His 3-act play The Jeweler's Shop also employs a trio of couples reversing the dramatic order, setting the amore lovers first with the amare lovers second, concluding with a couple from the next generation, a plot twist that provides the experiential material that helps resolve their stand-off of positive vs negative fatalism allowing them to cross the threshold of hope. Burt Lancaster and Olivia Hussey starred in a 1989 movie adaptation entitled La Bottega dell'orefice.

== Bibliography ==
- Kidwell, Carol (2004). Pietro Bembo: Lover, Linguist, Cardinal. McGill-Queen's University Press. ISBN 978-0-7735-2709-6.
- Bembo, Pietro (1584). Gli Asolani di M. Pietro Bembo (in Italian). Tomaso Porcacchi da Castiglione Aretino.
- Bembo, Pietro (1954). Pietro Bembo's Gli Asolani. Translated by Gottfried, Rudolf B. Indiana University Press. Archived from the original on 2017-02-23.
