= Palma Vecchio =

Italian painter (c.1480–1528)

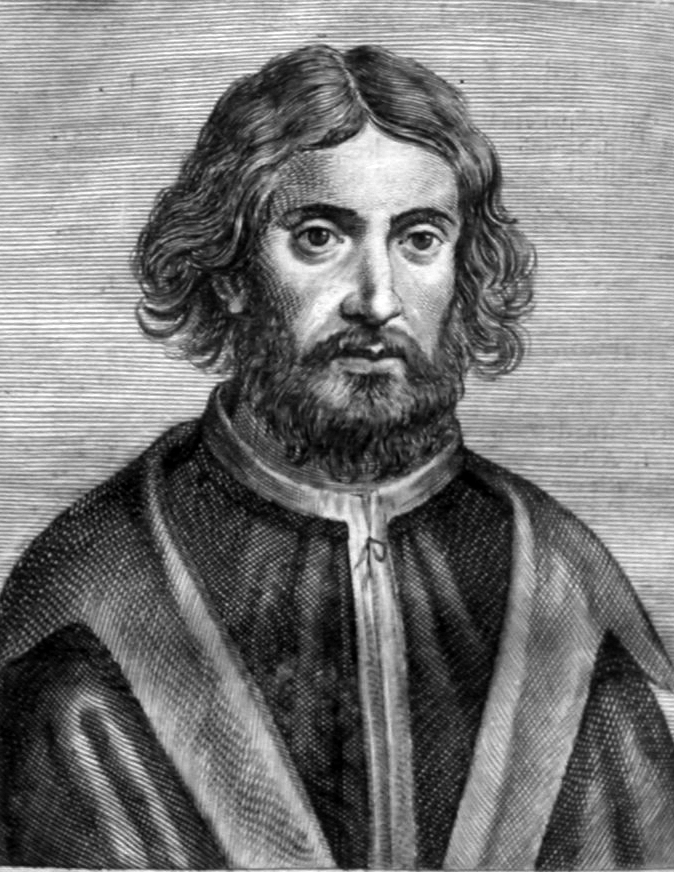
- Imaginative portrait, c. 1648
- Born: Jacomo Nigretti de Lavalle c. 1480; Serina, Republic of Venice
- Died: 30 June 1528 (aged 47–48); Venice, Republic of Venice
- Known for: Painting
- Movement: High Renaissance

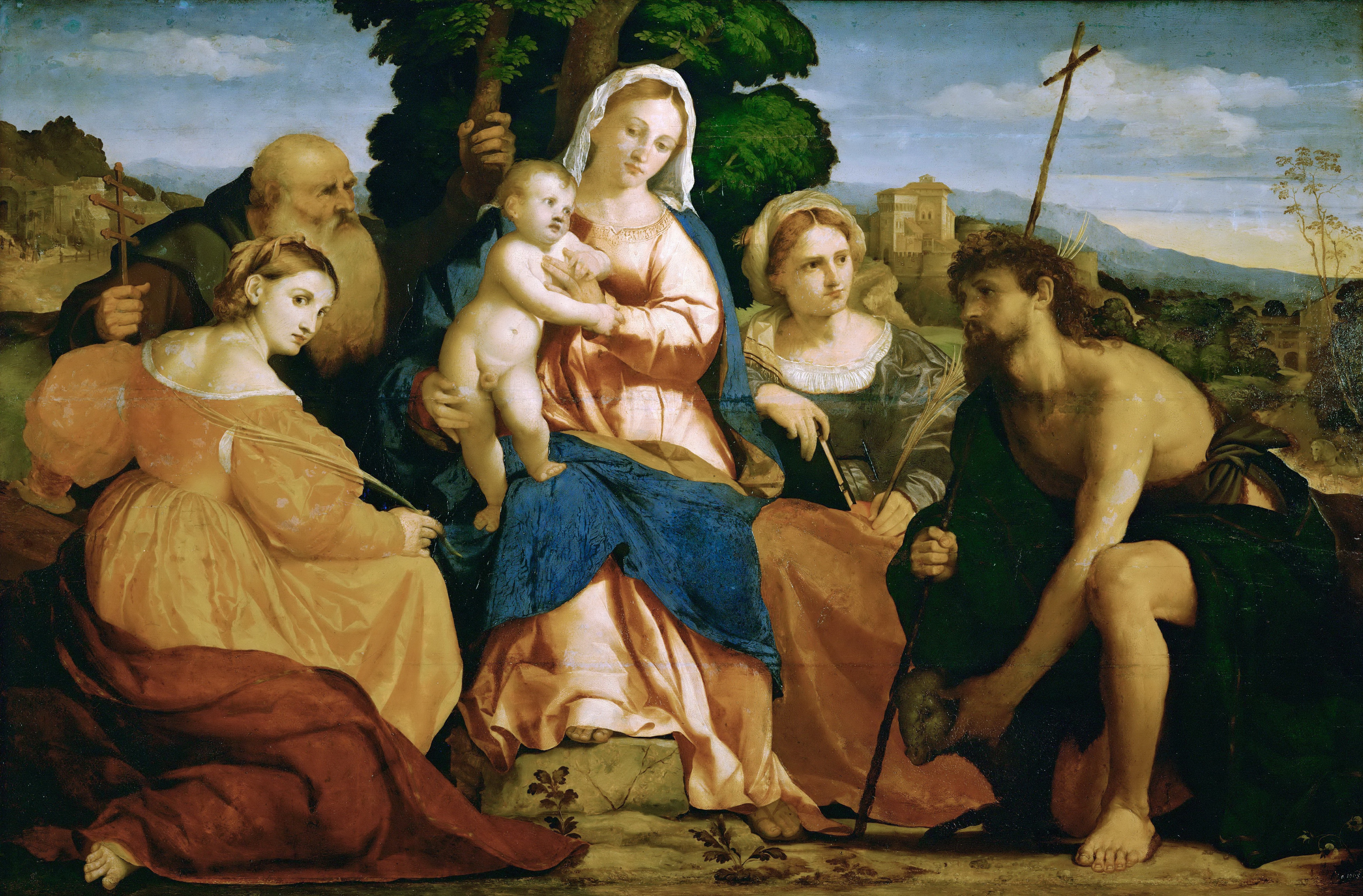
Virgin and Child, Saints Catharine and Celestine, John the Baptist and Barbara, 1520–1522

Palma Vecchio (c. 1480 – 30 July 1528), born Jacopo Palma, also known as Jacopo Negretti, was a Venetian painter of the Italian High Renaissance. He is called Palma Vecchio in English and Palma il Vecchio in Italian ("Palma the Elder") to distinguish him from Palma il Giovane ("Palma the Younger"), his great-nephew, who was also a painter.

== Life ==
Palma was born at Serina Alta near Bergamo, a dependency of the Republic of Venice, but his recorded career all took place in or near Venice. He is first recorded in Venice in 1510, but had probably already been there for some time. He was perhaps apprenticed to Andrea Previtali, who also came from Bergamo, and who returned there in 1511. Palma's earlier works show the influence of Giovanni Bellini, Previtali's master and by then the aged doyen of Venetian painting, but Palma came to follow the new style and subjects pioneered by Giorgione and Titian. After the deaths of Bellini and Giorgione, and the removal from Venice of Sebastiano del Piombo, Lorenzo Lotto and Previtali, before long Palma found himself, after Titian, the leading painter in Venice, much in demand until his early death at the age of 47 (according to Vasari; his date of birth is calculated from this). His stock has been rising somewhat in recent decades, as more attributions are removed from Giorgione and Titian and given to him; his "sheer painterly capacity" in the handling of paint and color is extremely fine.

He painted the new pastoral mythologies and half-length portraits, often of idealized beauties who, then as now, were enticingly suspected of being portraits of Venice's famous courtesans. He also painted religious pieces, in particular developing the sacra conversazione (the Virgin and Child with a group of saints and perhaps donors) in a horizontal form with a landscape background. In other, secular, groups something seems to occurring between the figures, though exactly what is unclear. All these types of painting were patronized by wealthy Venetians for their homes.

He also painted traditional vertical altarpieces for churches inside Venice and around the Venetian territories on the mainland such as the Presentation of the Virgin Altarpiece, now in Serina. However, he was not commissioned to paint a main altar in Venice until 1525, at Sant'Elena, Venice (now Brera, Milan). He was quick to absorb influences from other parts of Italy, sometimes copying poses from Michelangelo, and taking influence from Central Italy from about 1515 into the 1520's.

Palma's mature work from the 1520's shows a "High Renaissance style, characterized by his mastery of contrapposto, the enrichment of his high-keyed palette and the development of a dignified and diverse repertory of ideal human types in conservative compositions. These qualities dominated his work to the exclusion of dramatic chiaroscuro, spatial experiment, expressionism and innovative composition." Critical opinion is rather divided as whether the art from shortly before his sudden death was continuing to develop, or had lost energy and direction. S. J. Freedberg sees his career as oscillating between the influences of Titian and other north and Central Italian trends, including Mannerism. He had a workshop about which little certain is known, and may have taught Bonifazio Pitati, who he certainly influenced, as he did Giovanni Busi.

== Works ==
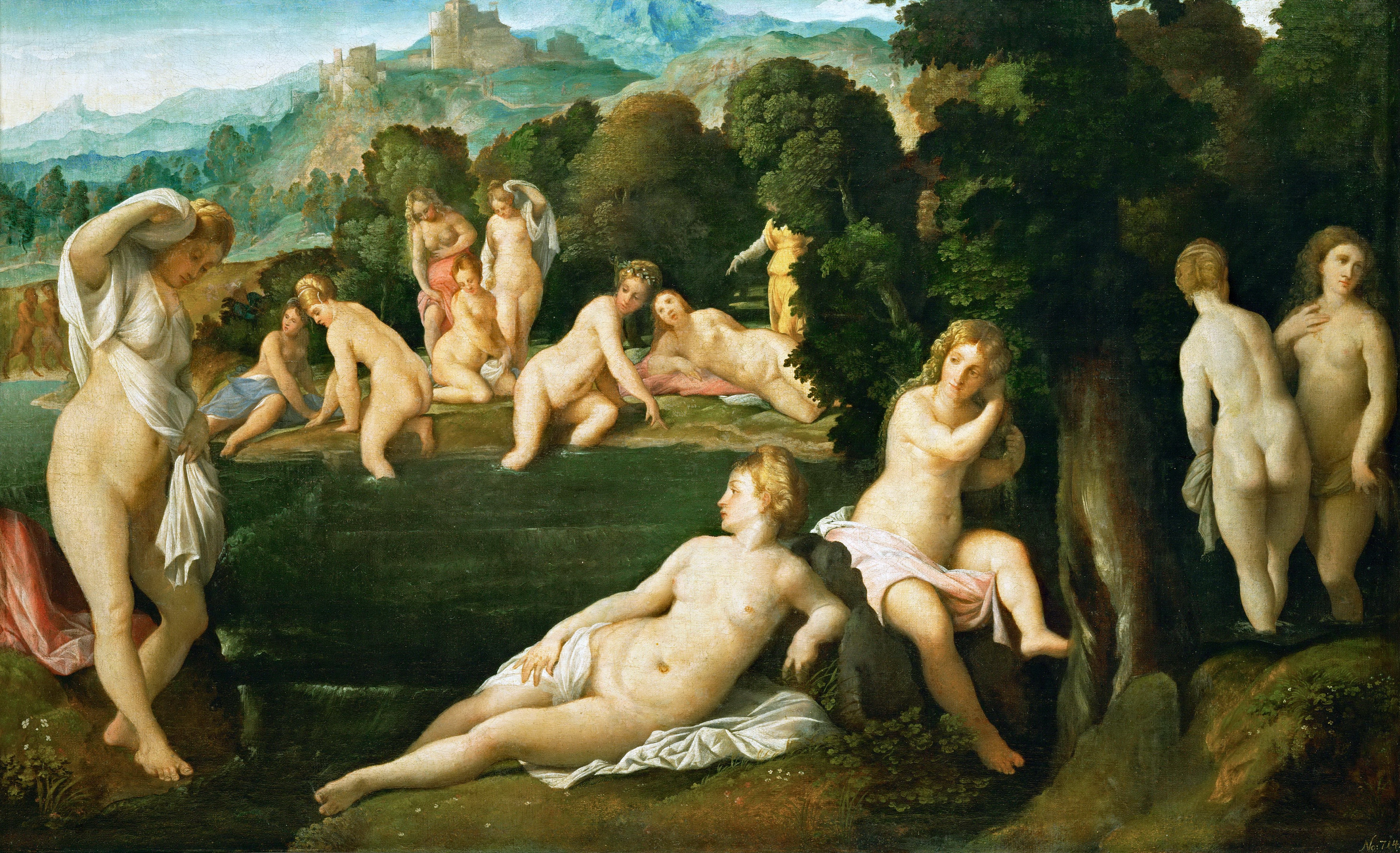
Diana and Callisto, or Nymphs Bathing, 1525-1528

His paintings frequently feature his (so-called) daughter Violante, of whom Titian was said to be enamoured. Famous works by Palma include a composition of six paintings in the Venetian church of Santa Maria Formosa, with St Barbara in the centre, under the dead Christ, and to right and left SS. Dominic, Sebastian, John Baptist and Anthony. A second work is in the Dresden Gallery, representing three sisters seated in the open air; it is frequently named The Three Graces. A third work, discovered in Venice in 1900, is a portrait supposed to represent Violante.

Other leading examples are: the Last Supper in the National Gallery for Foreign Art; a Madonna, in the church of Santo Stefano in Vicenza; the Epiphany, (Brera Gallery, Milan); the Holy Family with a young shepherd (Louvre, Paris), The Holy Family with St. Catherine, St. John and Donor and Self Portrait (Beli Dvor, Belgrade), St Stephen and other Saints, Christ and the Widow of Nain and the Assumption of the Virgin, (Gallerie dell'Accademia, Venice), Holy Family with the Infant Saint John the Baptist and Saint Mary Magdalene (Uffizi), Lady with a Lute (Alnwick Castle, England), Christ at Emmaus (Pitti Palace) and Holy Family with Saint John the Baptist and Saint Catherine. Palma's works are illustrated and analysed in the catalogue raisonné of the art critic Philip Rylands.

It has recently been realized that Titian completed a sacra conversazione by Palma, probably after his death; he had probably done the same for Giorgione after his death. He overpainted two of the figures, and made changes to the background. It is now in the Gallerie dell'Accademia in Venice.

== Gallery ==
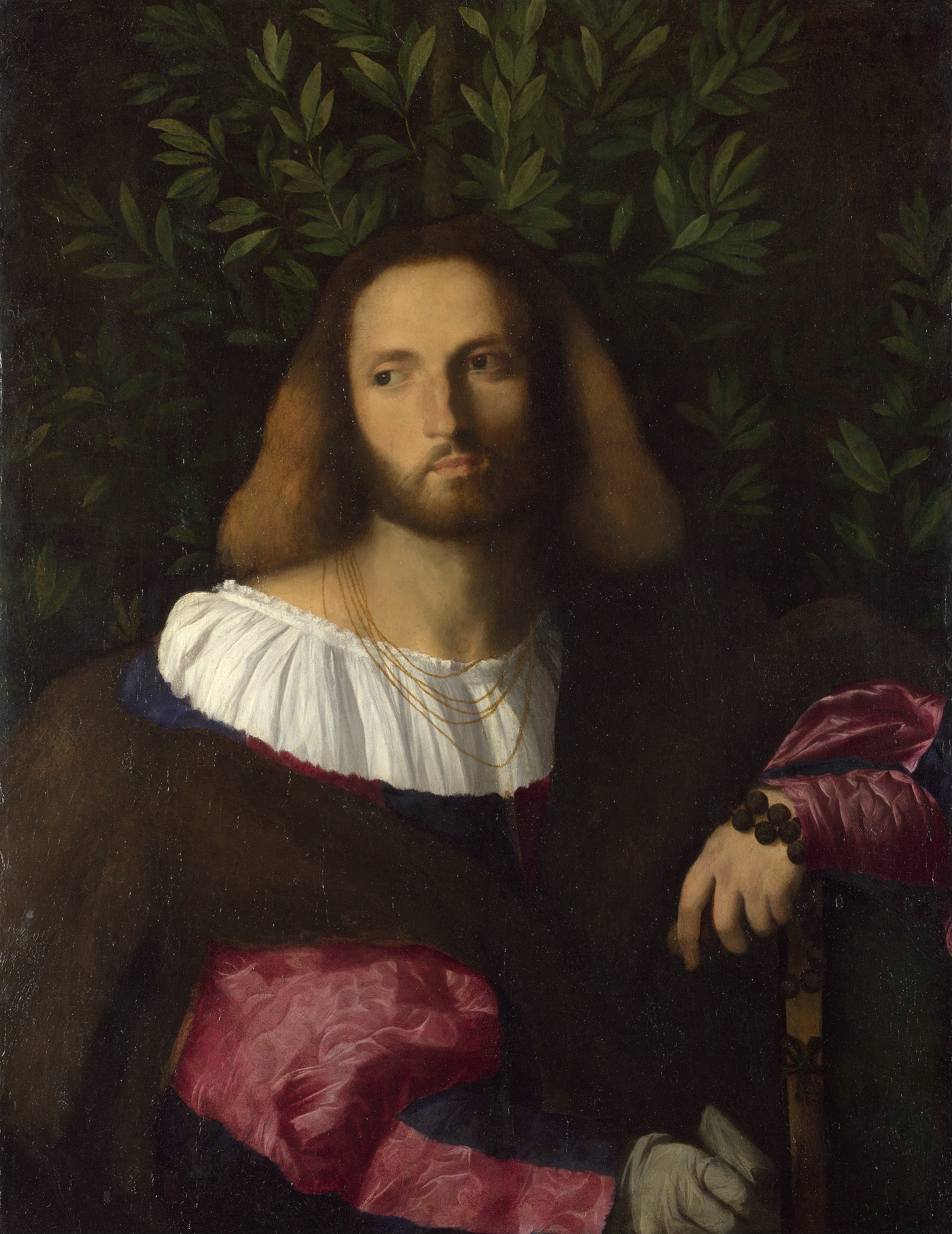
Portrait of a Poet, c. 1516

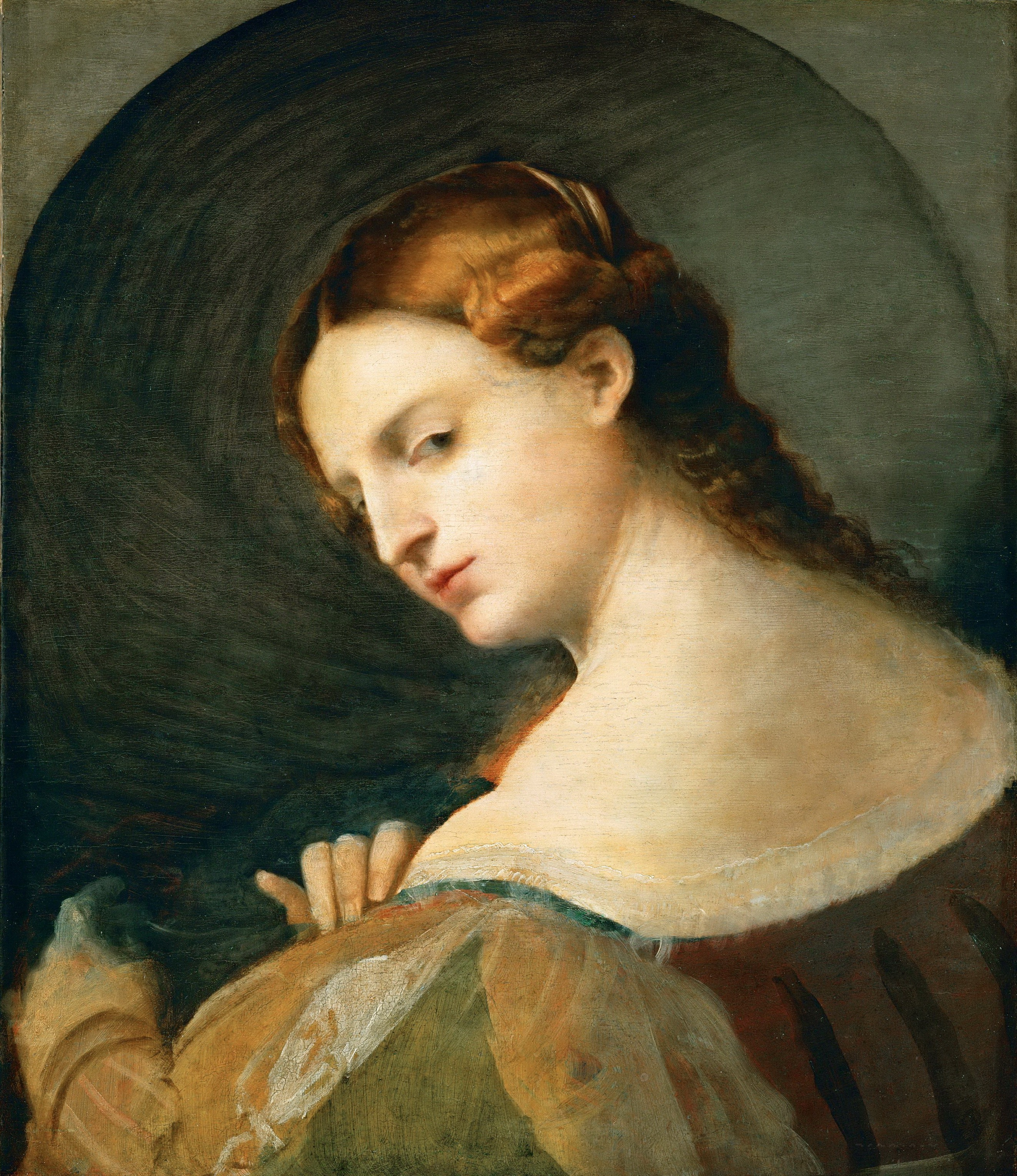
Young Woman in Profile, c. 1512–1514

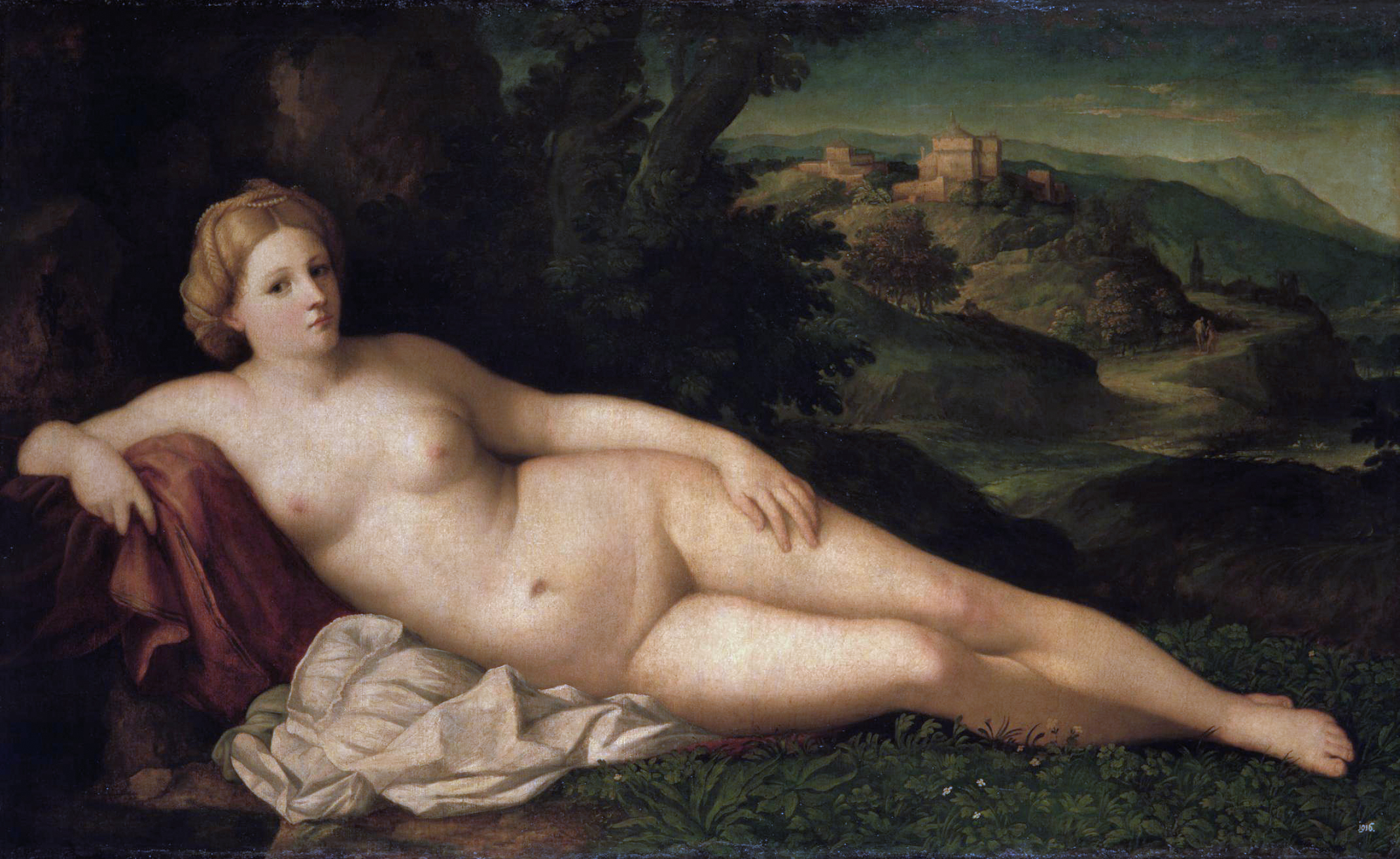
Nymph in a Landscape, c. 1518–1520

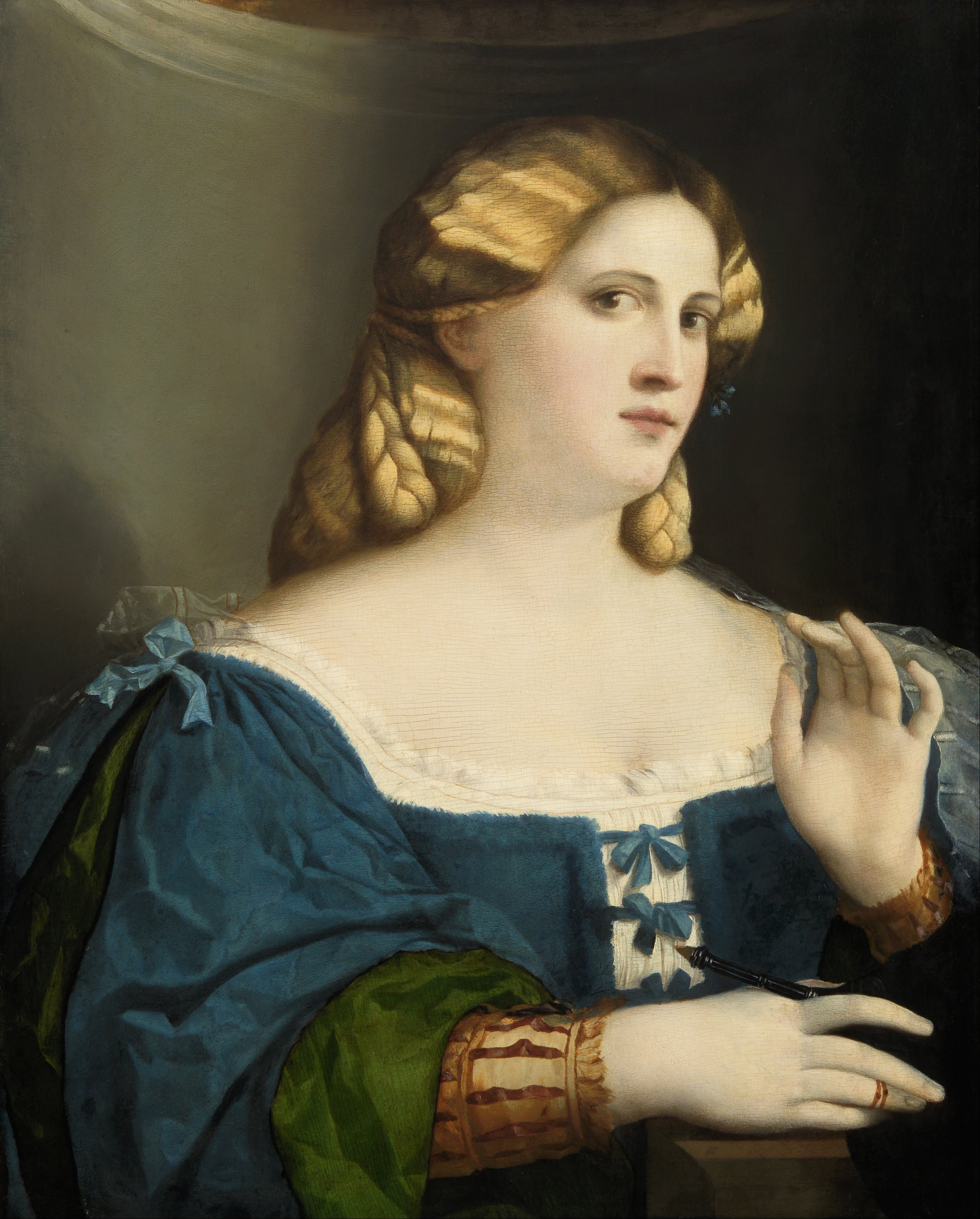
Young Woman in a Blue Dress, with Fan, 1512–1514

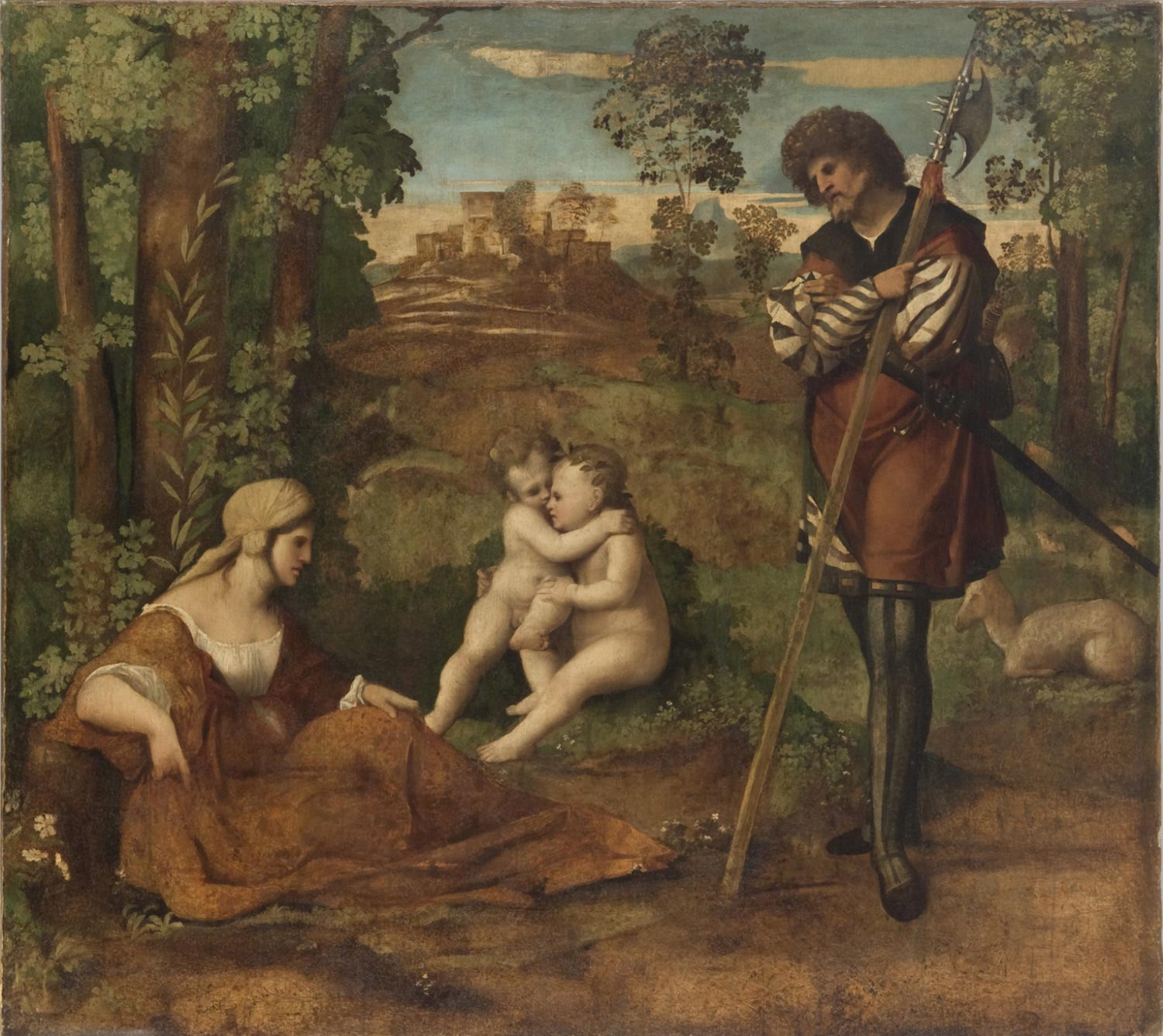
Allegory, by 1515, Philadelphia Museum of Art

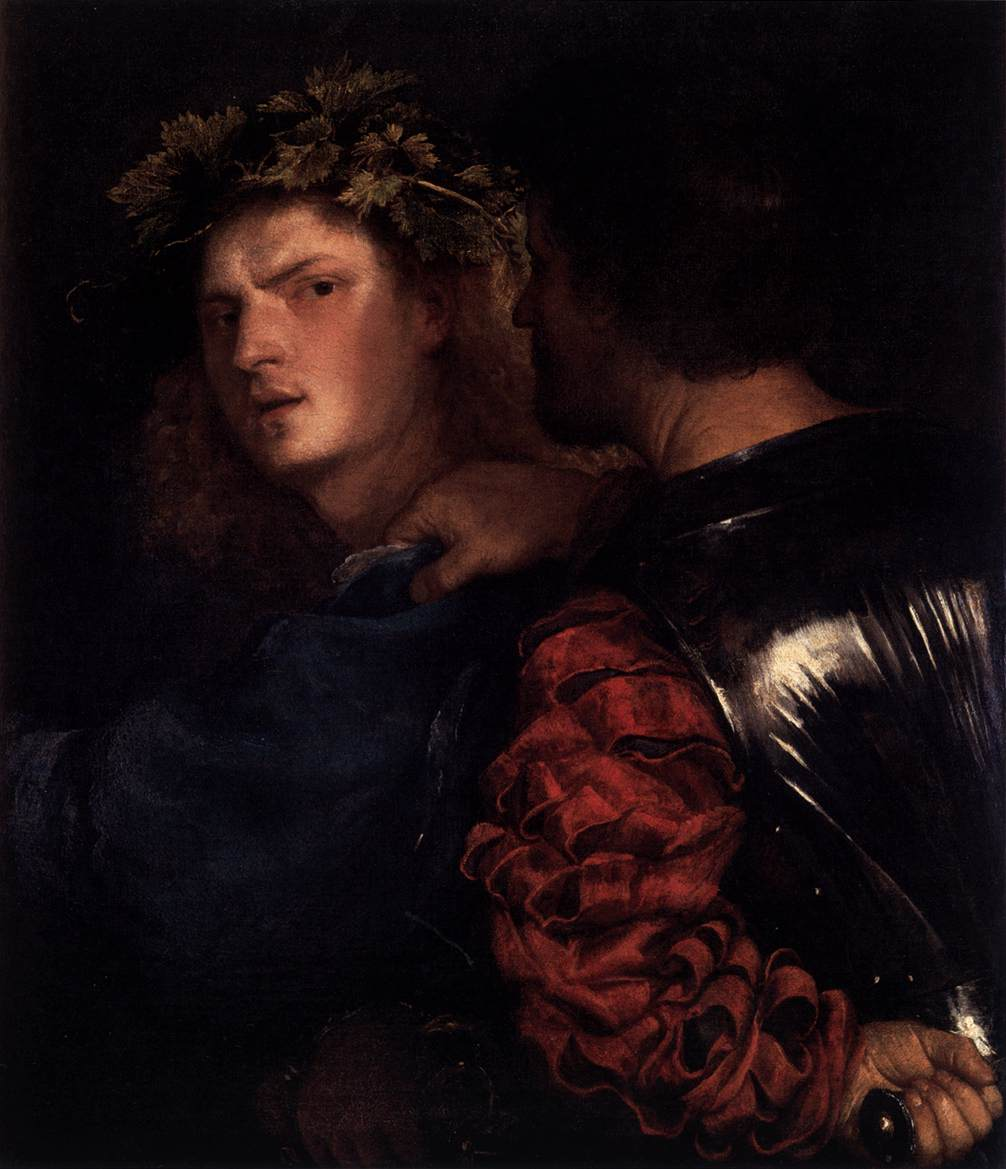
The Bravo, an example of a painting often attributed to Titian or Giorgione, but also to Palma.

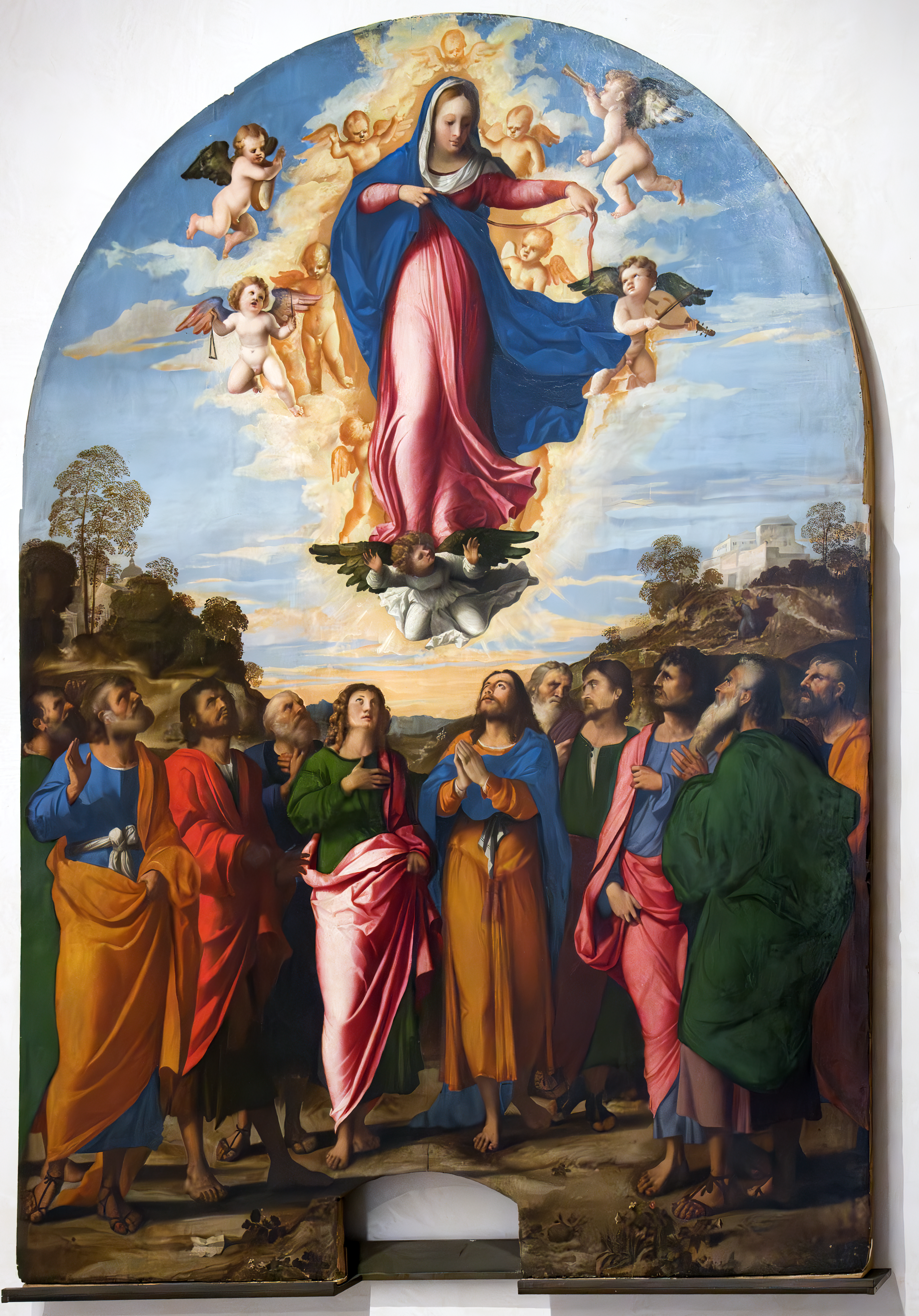
Assumption of the Virgin, a large altarpiece, 1512-1514.

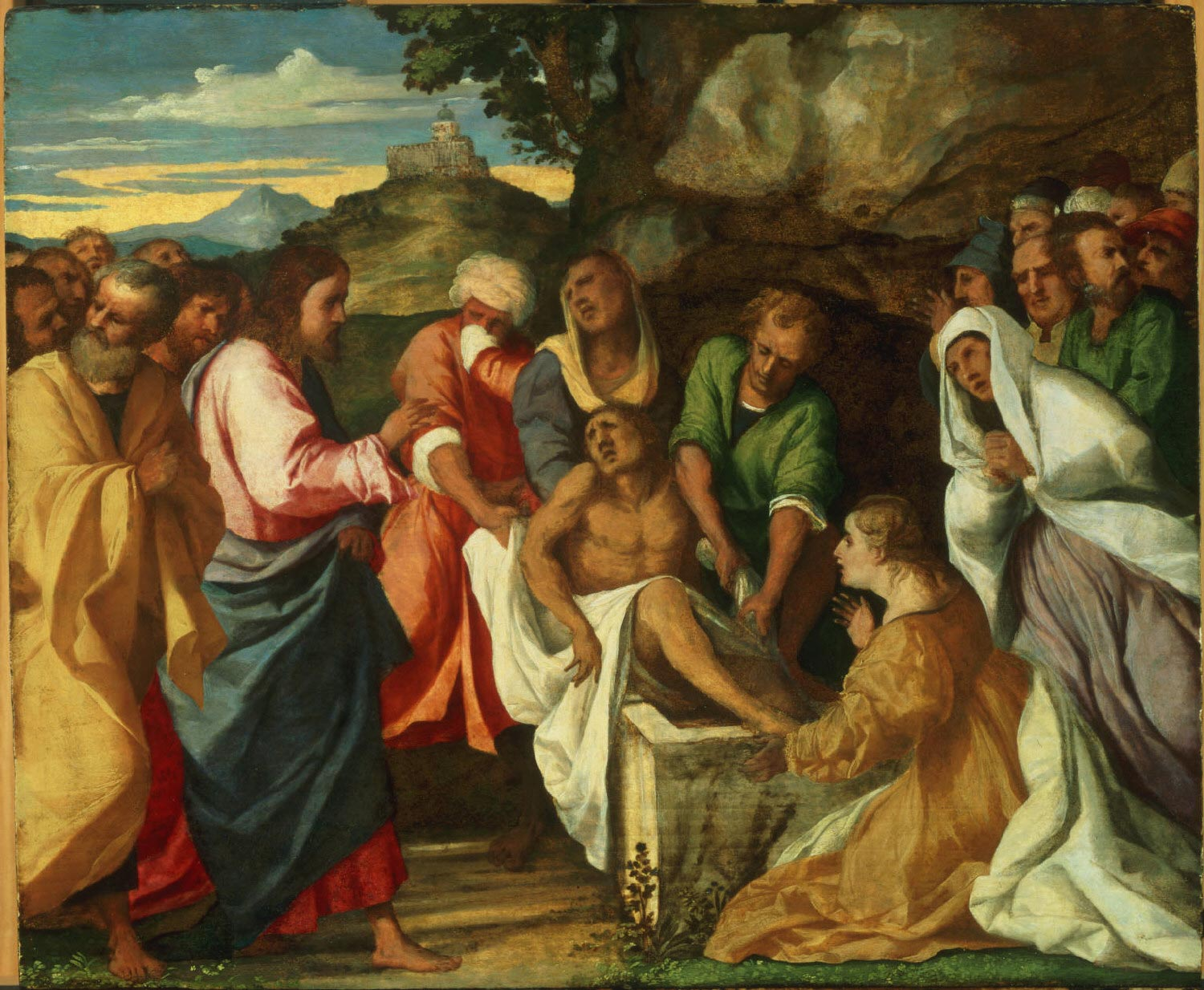
The Raising of Lazarus, c. 1514

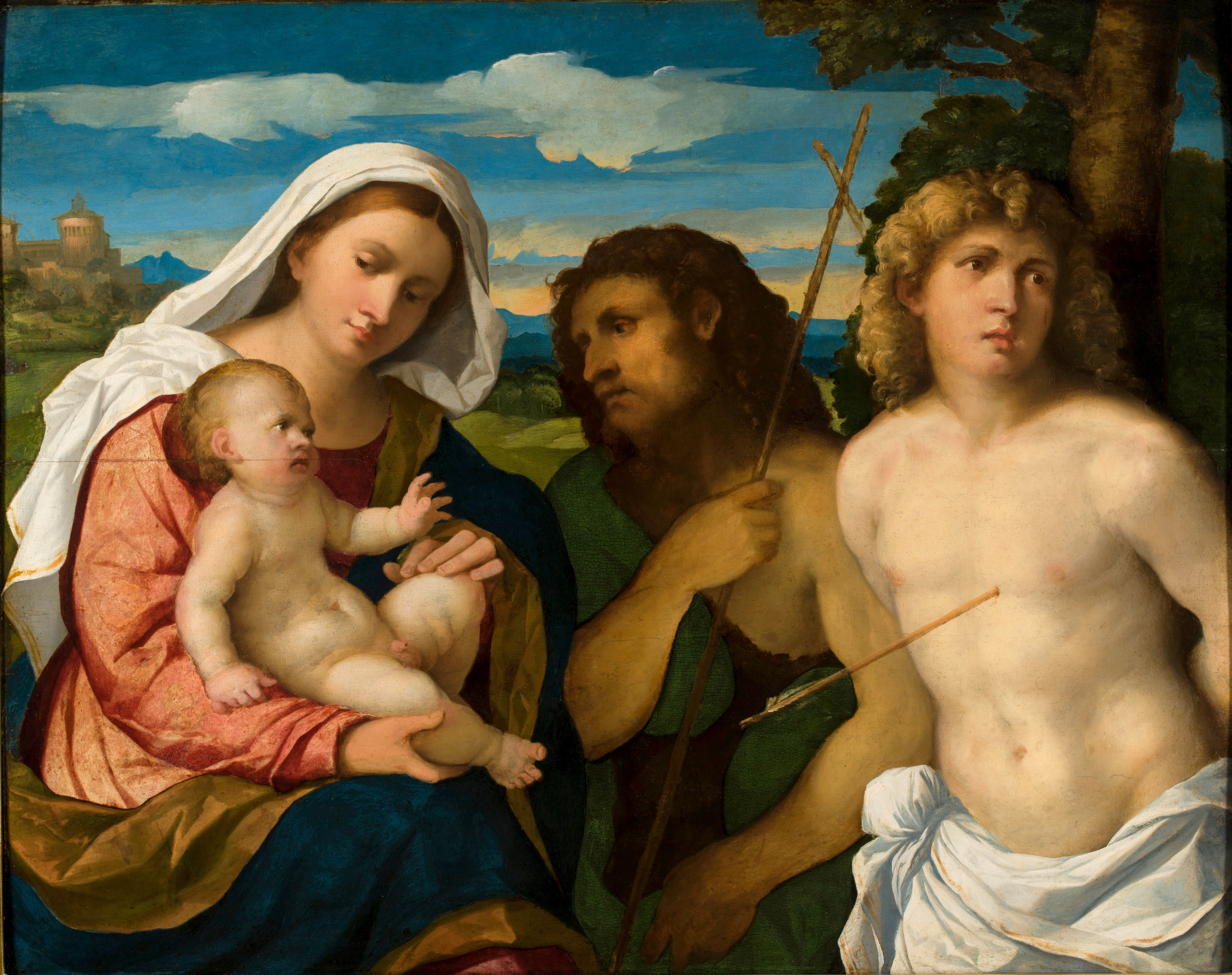
Sacra Conversazione, 1516–1518

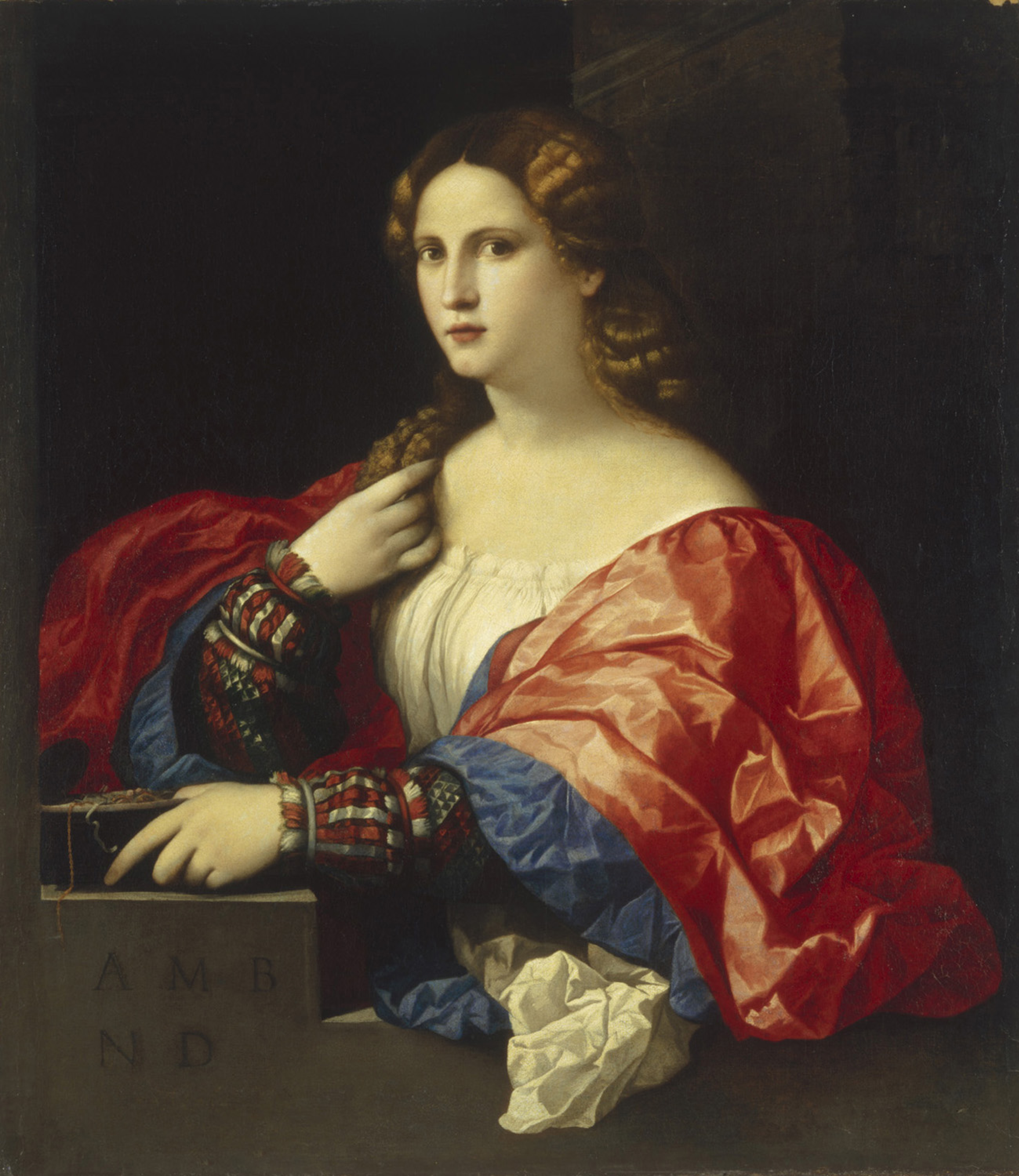
La Bella, 1518–1520

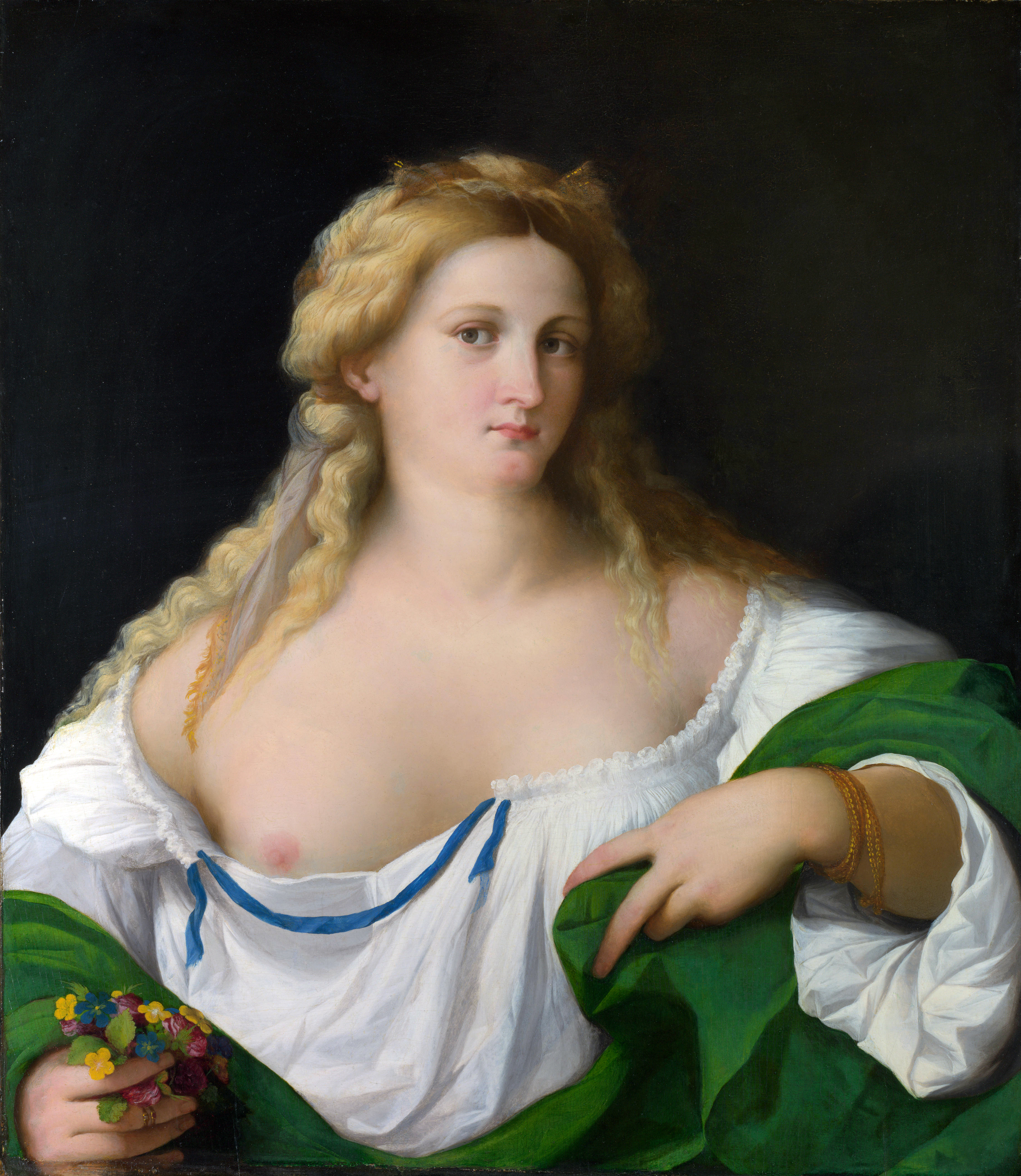
A Blonde Woman, c. 1520

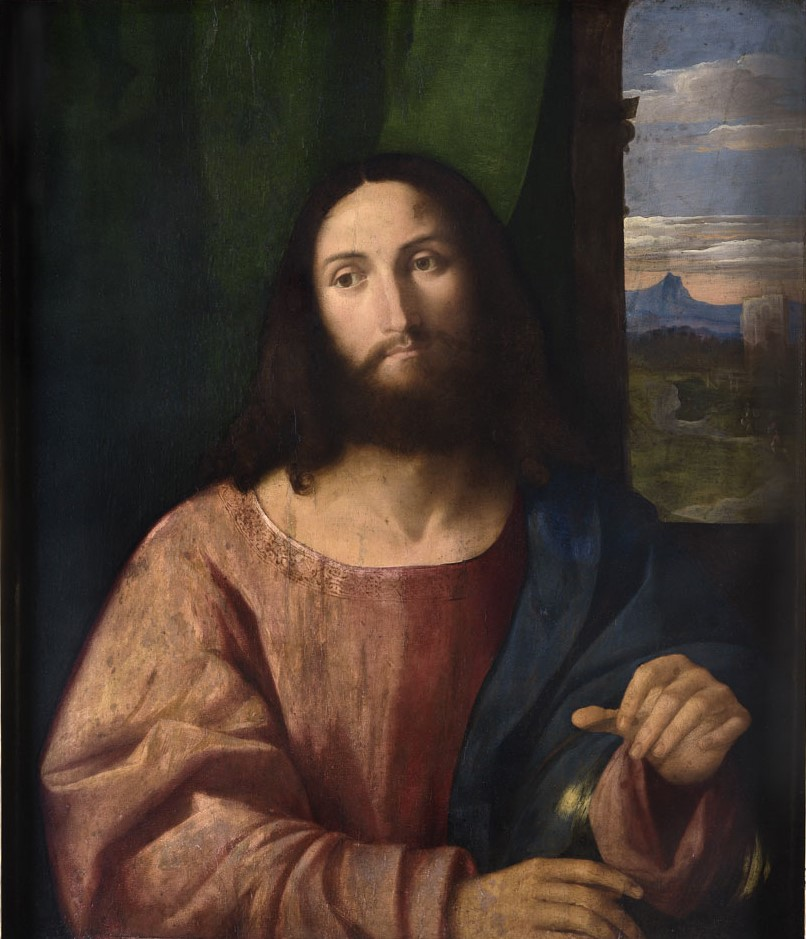
Salvator Mundi, c. 1518–1522

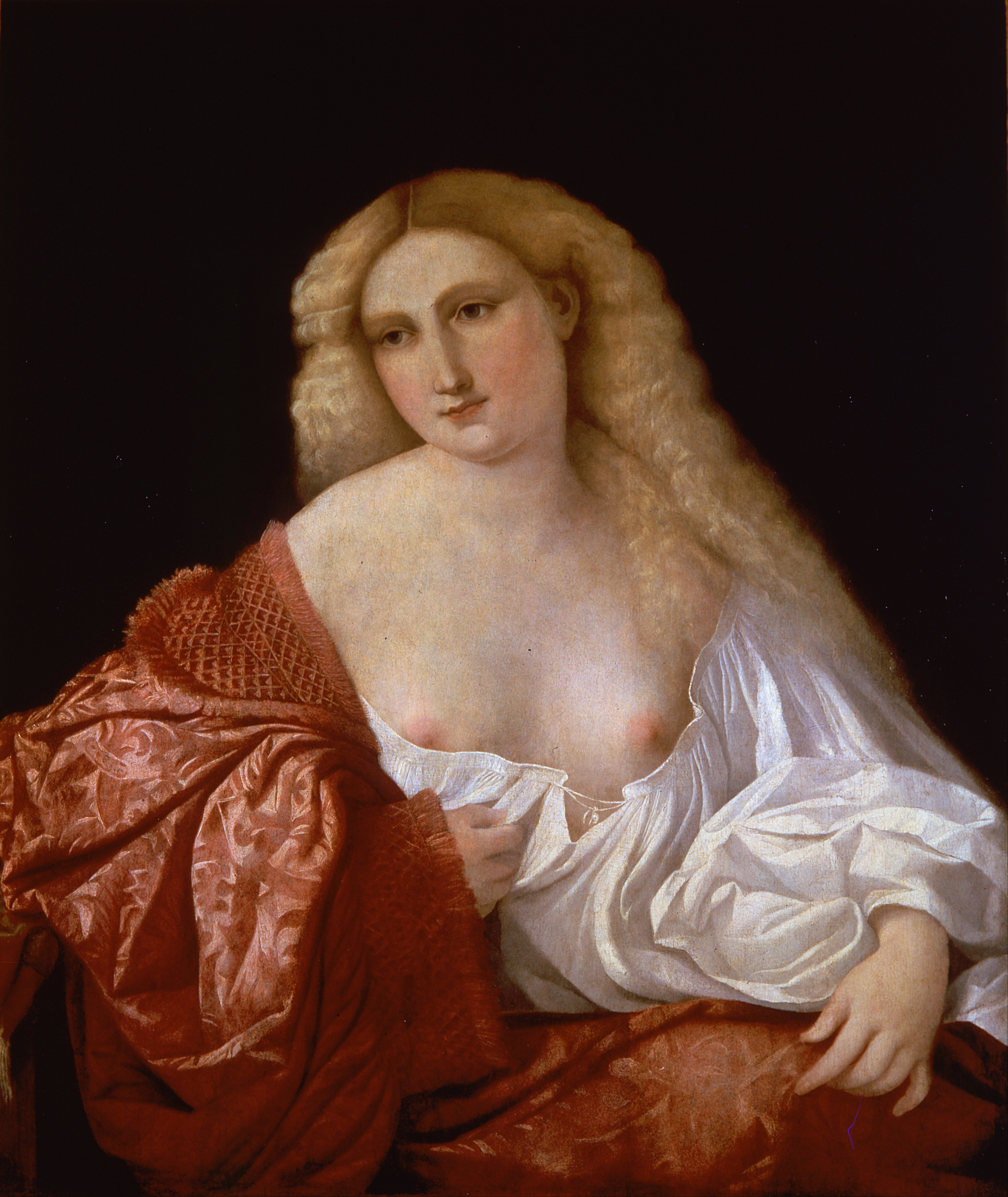
An unusually explicit Portrait of a Courtesan, 1520

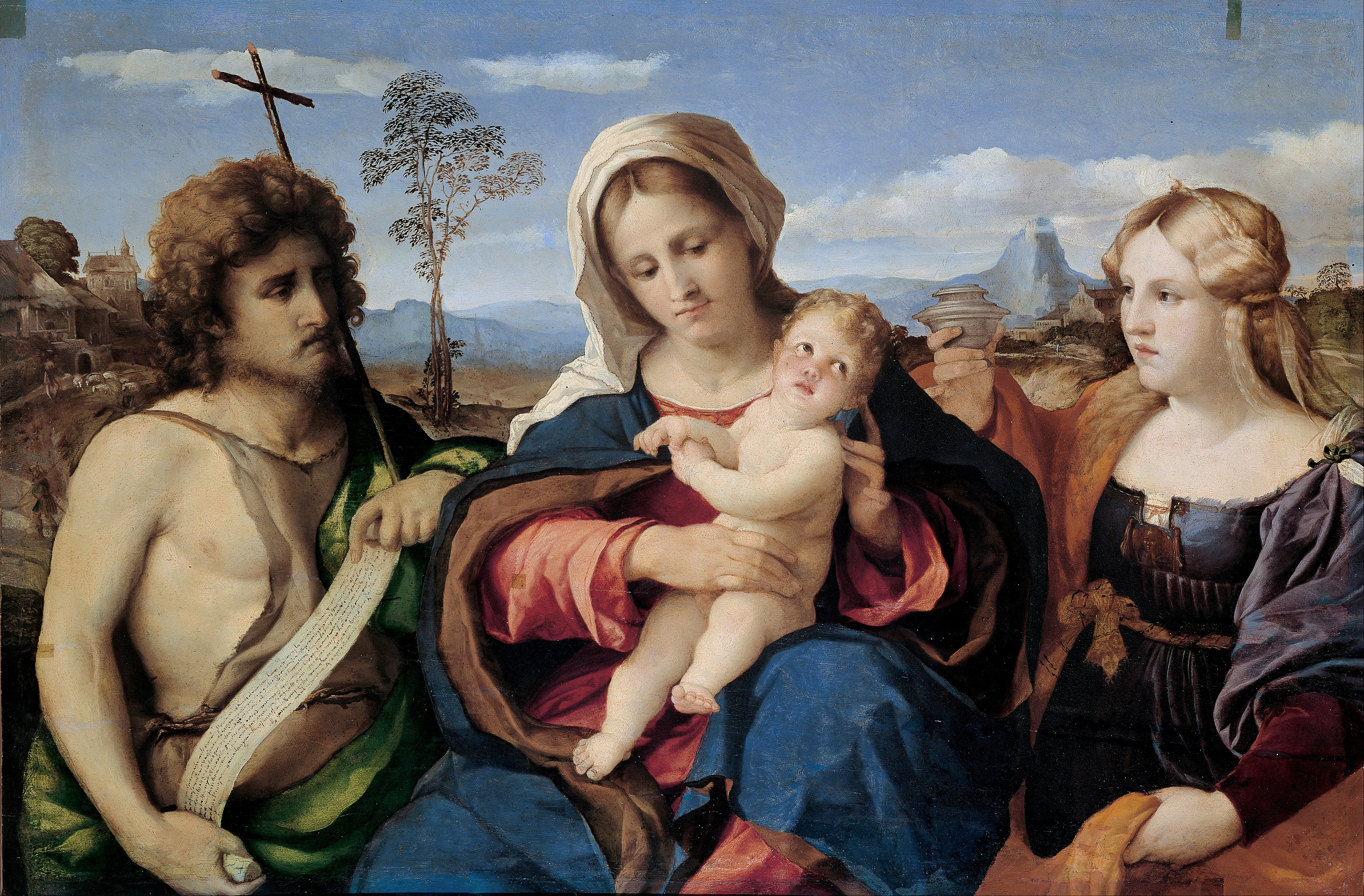
Madonna and Child with Saint John the Baptist and Mary Magdalene, 1520–1522

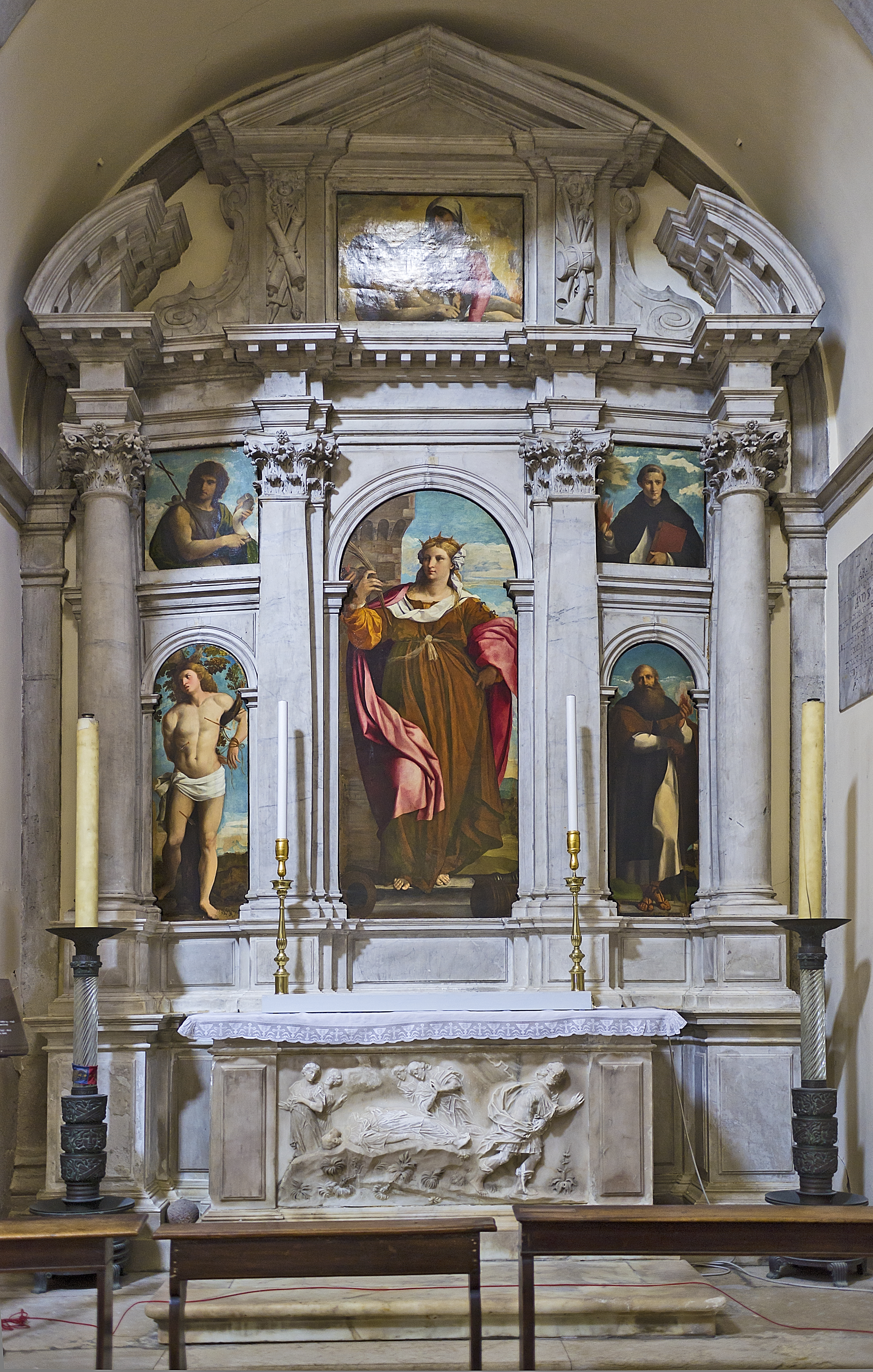
St. Barbara polyptych, 1523–24, Santa Maria Formosa, Venice

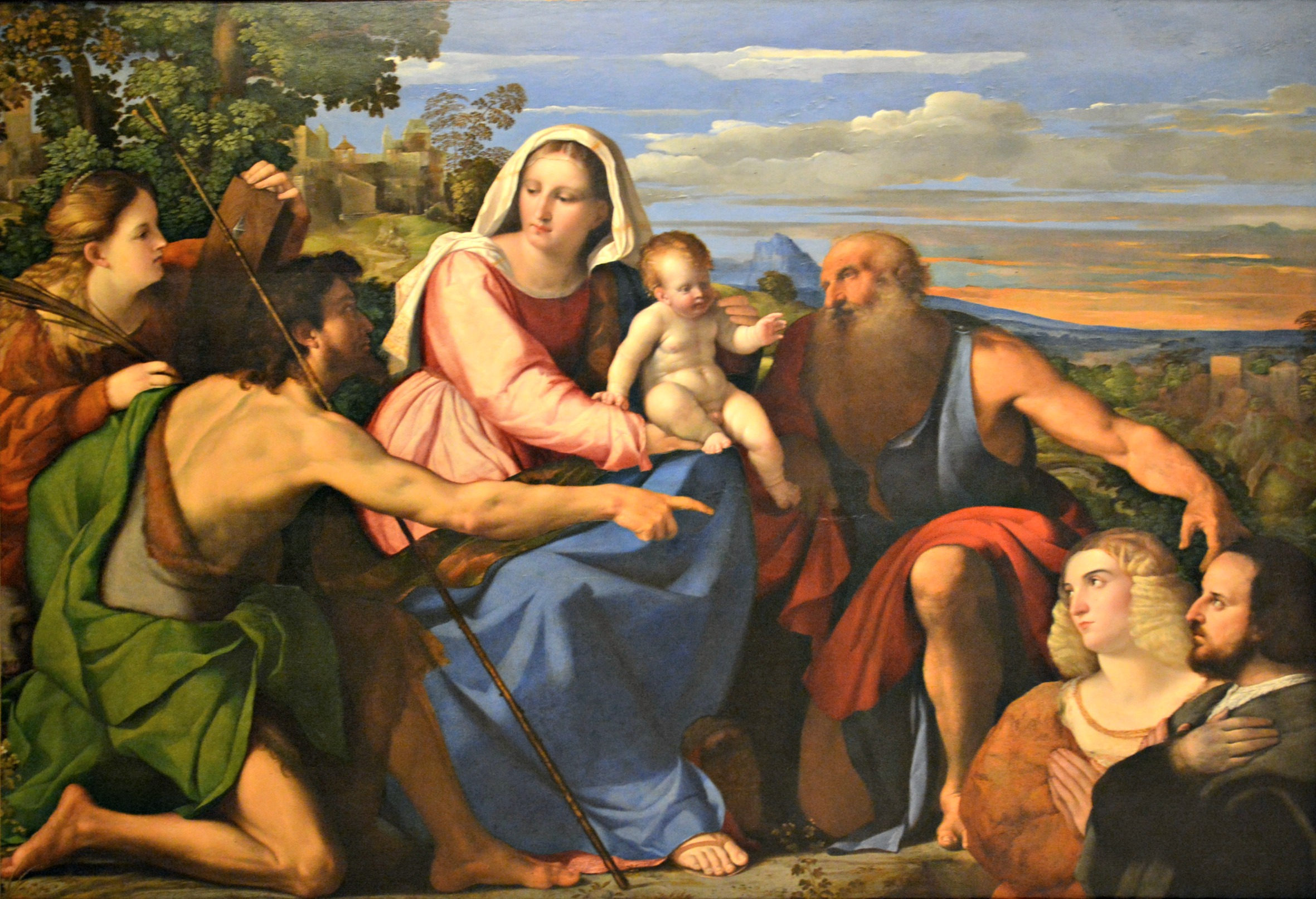
Madonna and Child with Donors

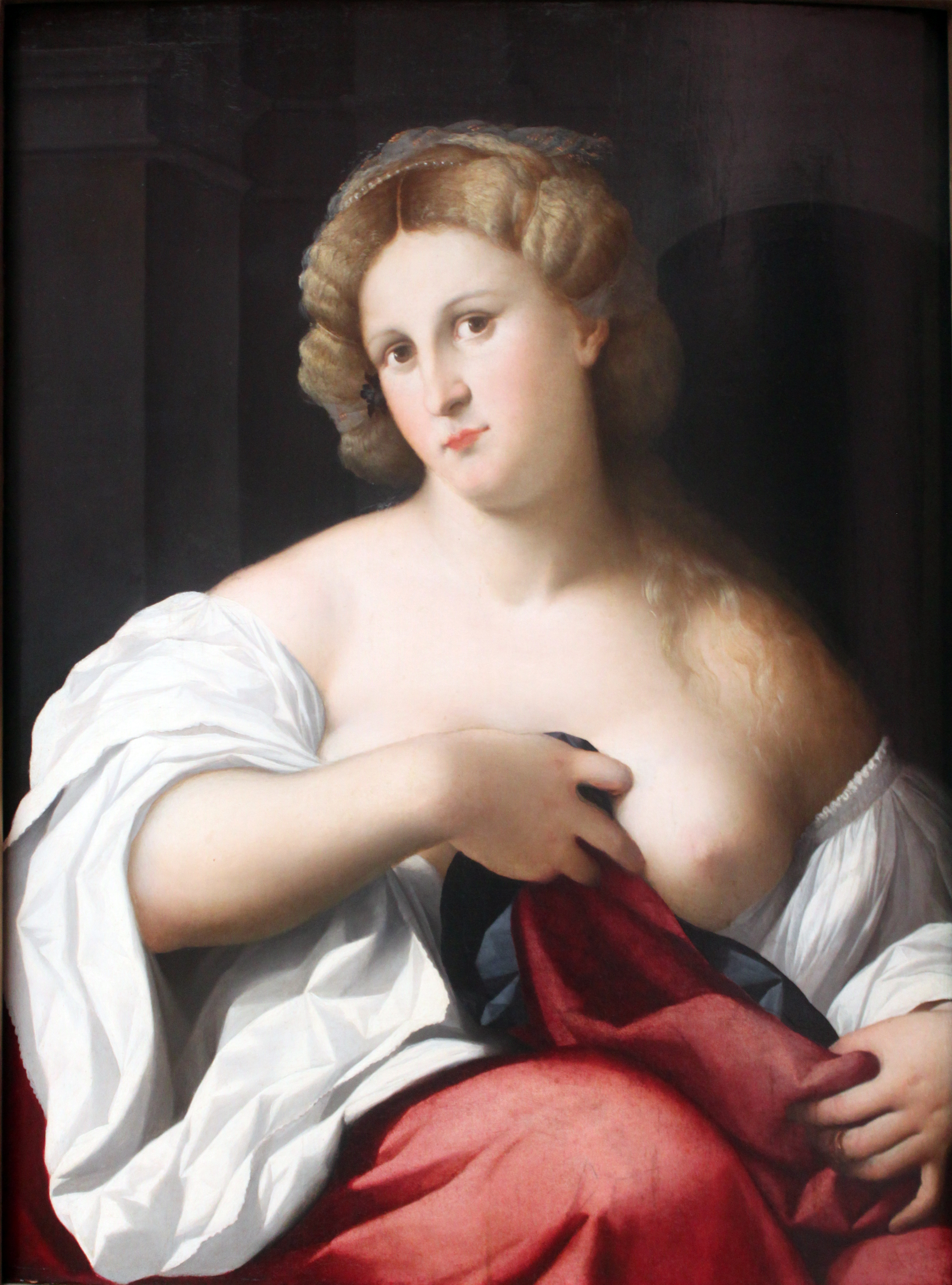
Woman with a breast uncovered, 1525

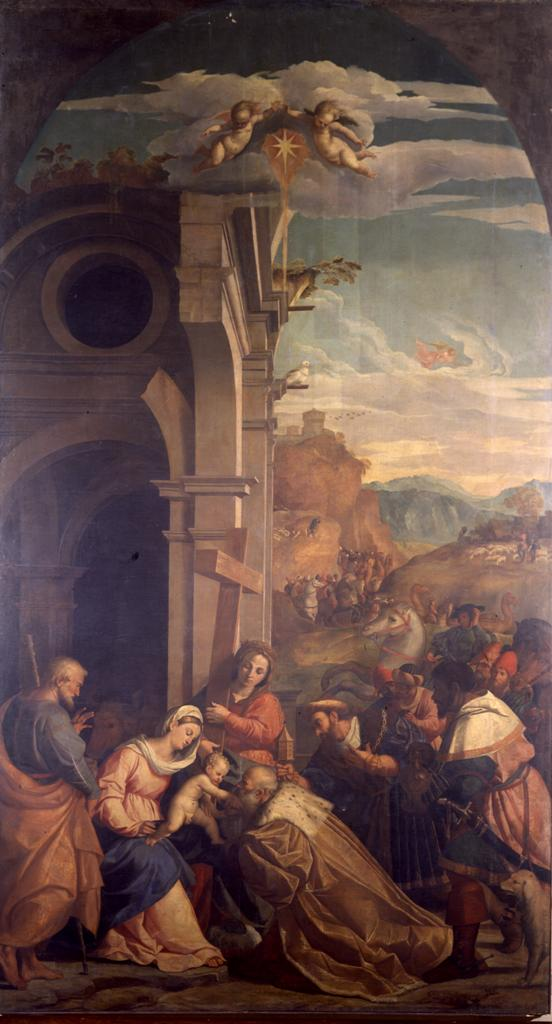
Adoration of the Magi with Saint Helena, 1525–1526

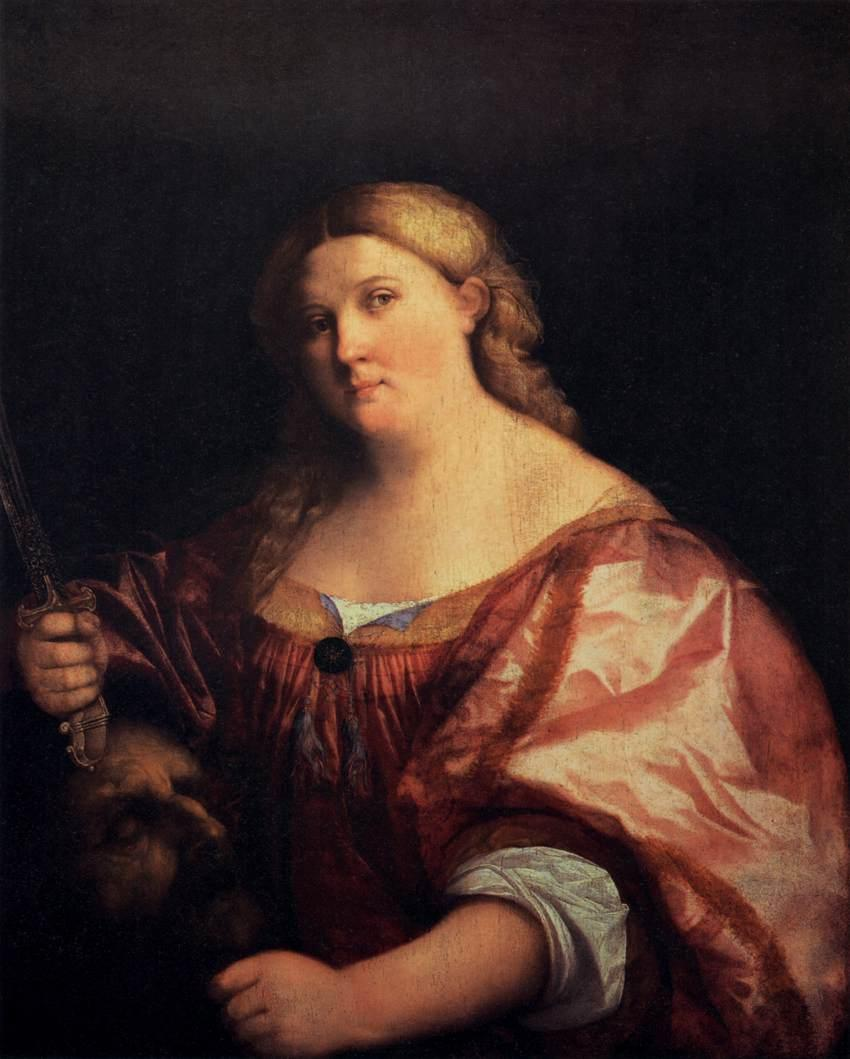
Judith, 1525–1528

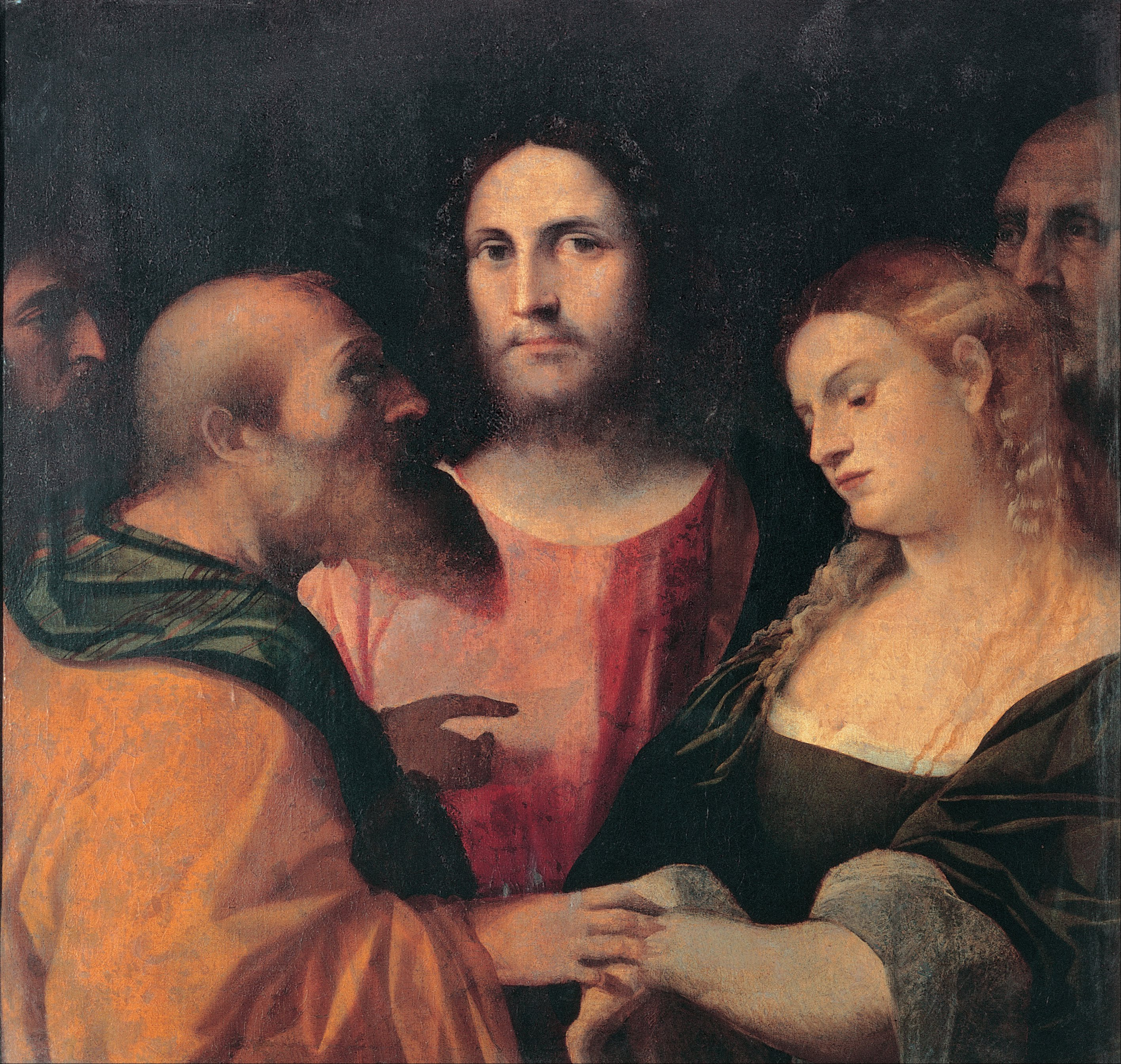
Christ and the Woman Taken in Adultery, 1525–1528
