= Pietro Bembo =

Italian scholar, poet, and cardinal (1470–1547)

His Eminence Pietro Bembo OSIH
- Portrait of Cardinal Pietro Bembo by Titian, c. 1540
- Born: 20 May 1470; Venice, Republic of Venice
- Died: 18 January 1547 (aged 76); Rome, Papal States
- Occupations: Cleric, scholar, poet, literary theorist
- Writing career
- Language: Italian, Tuscan dialect
- Genres: poetry, non-fiction
- Movements: Renaissance literature, Petrarchism

Bembo's Coat of Arms

Pietro Bembo (Latin: Petrus Bembus; 20 May 1470 – 18 January 1547) was a Italian scholar, poet, and literary theorist who also was a member of the Knights Hospitaller and a cardinal of the Catholic Church. As an intellectual of the Italian Renaissance (15th–16th c.), Pietro Bembo greatly influenced the development of the Tuscan dialect as a literary language for poetry and prose, which, by later codification into a standard language, became the modern Italian language. In the 16th century, Bembo's poetry, essays and books proved crucial to reviving interest in the literary works of Petrarch. In the field of music, Bembo's literary writing techniques helped composers develop the techniques of musical composition that made the madrigal the most important secular music of 16th-century Italy.

== Life ==
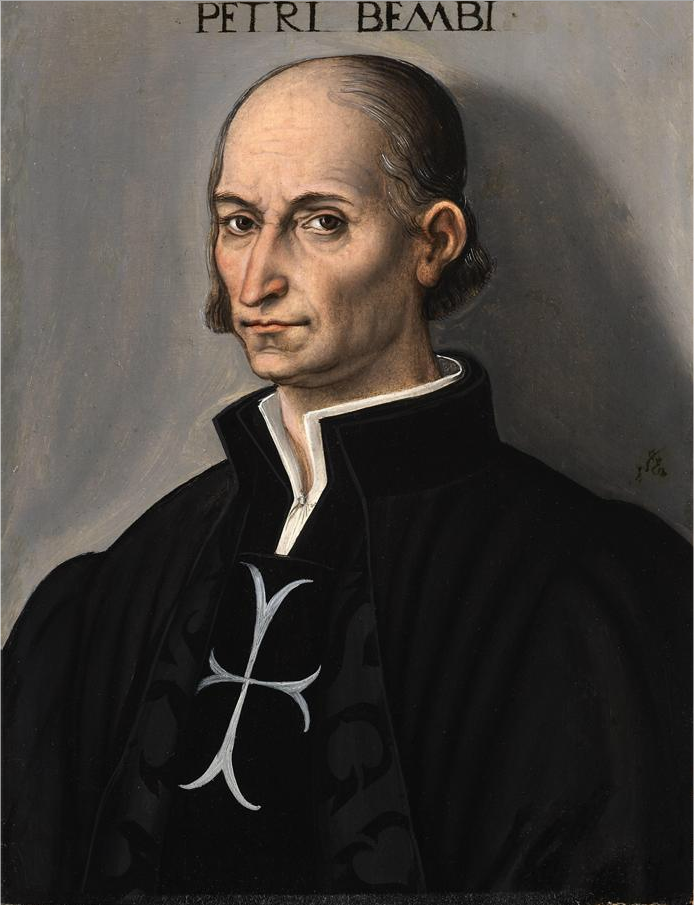
Bembo in the habit of a Knight of Malta. (Lucas Cranach the Younger)

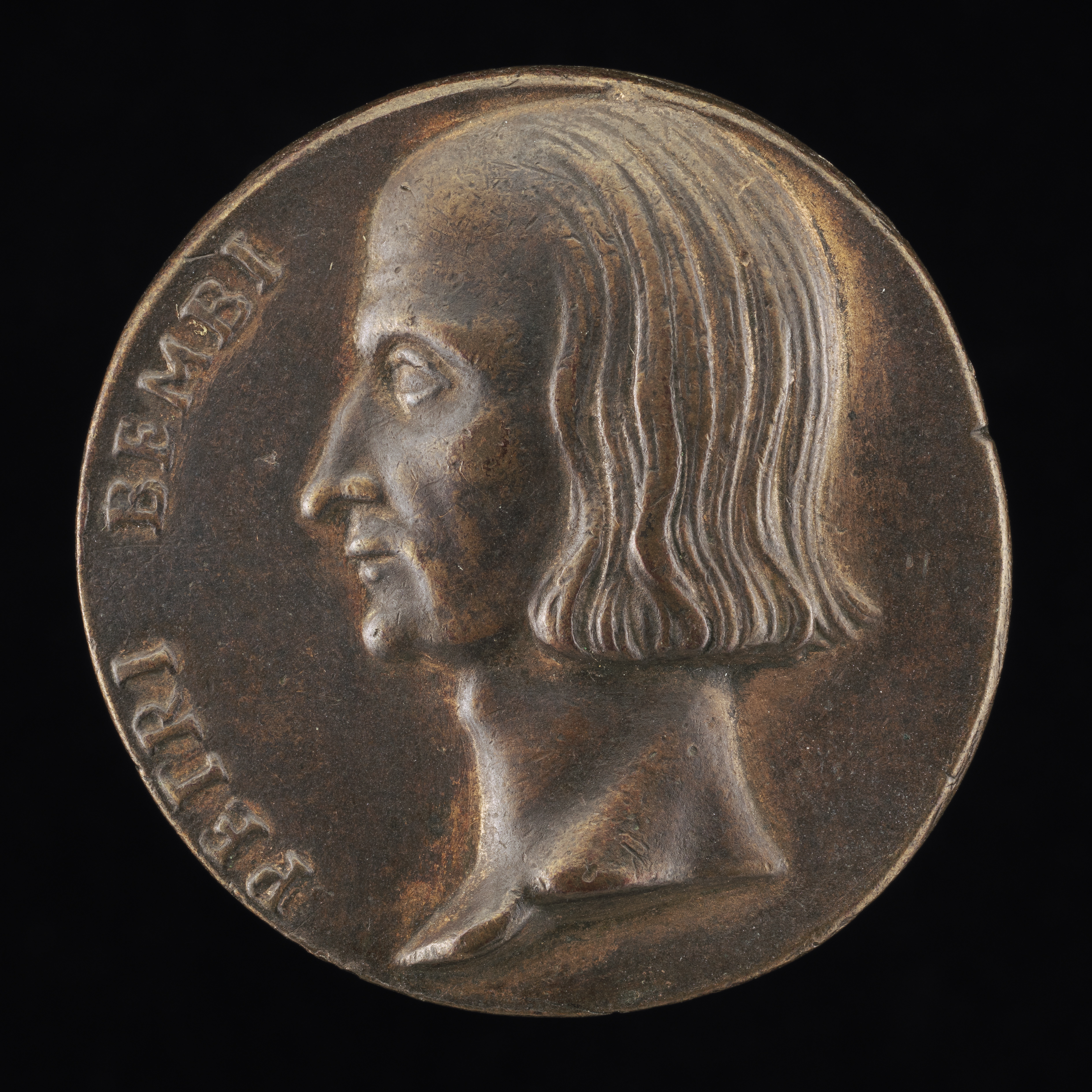
The obverse face of a bronze coin features the left profile of Bembo. (Valerio Belli, ca. 1532)

Pietro Bembo was born on 20 May 1470 to an aristocratic Venetian family. His father Bernardo Bembo (1433–1519) was a diplomat and statesman and a cultured man who cared for the literature of Italy, and erected a monument to Dante Alighieri (1265–1321) in Ravenna. Bernardo Bembo was an ambassador for the Republic of Venice (697–1797), and was accompanied by his son, Pietro. During his father's ambassadorships to Florence (1474–1476 and 1478–1480), Pietro acquired a love for the Tuscan dialect, from which the Italian language developed.

Under the tutelage of the neo-Platonist scholar Constantine Lascaris (1434–1501), Pietro Bembo studied Greek language for two years at Messina, and then studied at the University of Padua. His later travels included two years (1497–1499) at the Este court at Ferrara, during the reign of Ercole I d'Este, Duke of Ferrara (r. 1471–1505). For writers and composers, the city of Ferrara was an artistic centre where Bembo met the poet Ludovico Ariosto (1474–1533); later, in the 1497–1504 period, Bembo wrote his first work, Gli Asolani (The People of Asolo, 1505), a poetic dialogue about courtly love, which stylistically resembled the writing styles of the humanists Giovanni Boccaccio (1313–1375) and Petrarch (1304–1374). The poems were later set to music, which Bembo preferred to be sung by a woman to the accompaniment of a lute, an artistic wish granted in 1505 when he met Isabella d'Este (1474–1539) in her response to having received a gift copy of Gli asolani.

In the 1502–1503 period, Bembo again was in Ferrara, where he had a love affair with Lucrezia Borgia (1480–1519), wife of Alfonso I d'Este, Duke of Ferrara (1476–1534), son of the previous duke. In the event, Bembo left the city of Ferrara when Ercole employed Josquin des Prez (1450–1521) as a composer to the chapel; fortuitously, Bembo left town just as the Black Death plague killed most of the population of Ferrara in 1505, including the renowned composer Jacob Obrecht (1457–1505).

In the 1506–1512 period, Bembo resided in Urbino, where he wrote Prose della volgar lingua (Prose of the Vernacular Tongue, 1525), a treatise about composing and writing poetry in the vernacular language of the Tuscan dialect. He accompanied Giulio di Giuliano de' Medici (1478–1534) to Rome, where Bembo was later appointed Latin secretary to Pope Leo X (r. 1513–1521), and was also made a member of the Knights Hospitaller, in 1514. At the death of Pope Leo X in 1521, Bembo retired, with impaired health, to Padua and continued to write. In 1530, he accepted the office of official historian of his native Republic of Venice. Shortly afterwards, Bembo was also appointed librarian of the basilica of San Marco di Venezia.

On 20 December 1538, Pope Paul III (r. 1534–1549) made Bembo a cardinal in pectore (in secret). In 1538, Bembo received Holy Orders as a priest. Afterwards, Bembo's secret nomination as cardinal was published, and he then received the red Galero hat in a papal consistory on 10 March 1539, with the title of Cardinal Deacon of the church of San Ciriaco alle Terme Diocleziane, which occasion Bembo marked by commissioning a portrait from Titian (1488–1576), the most important painter of the Venetian school. In the event, Cardinal Bembo was advanced to the rank of Cardinal Priest in February 1542, with title to the church of San Crisogono, changed two years later to that of the Basilica of San Clemente. At Rome, Cardinal Bembo continued to write, and revised his earlier works, whilst studying theology and the history of Classical antiquity (A.D. 8th–6th c.). Despite having been rewarded for his successful administration of the dioceses of Gubbio and Bergamo, the Church did not promote Bembo to bishop. In 1547, Pietro Bembo died at the age of 77 years, and was buried in the church of Santa Maria sopra Minerva.

== Works and influence ==
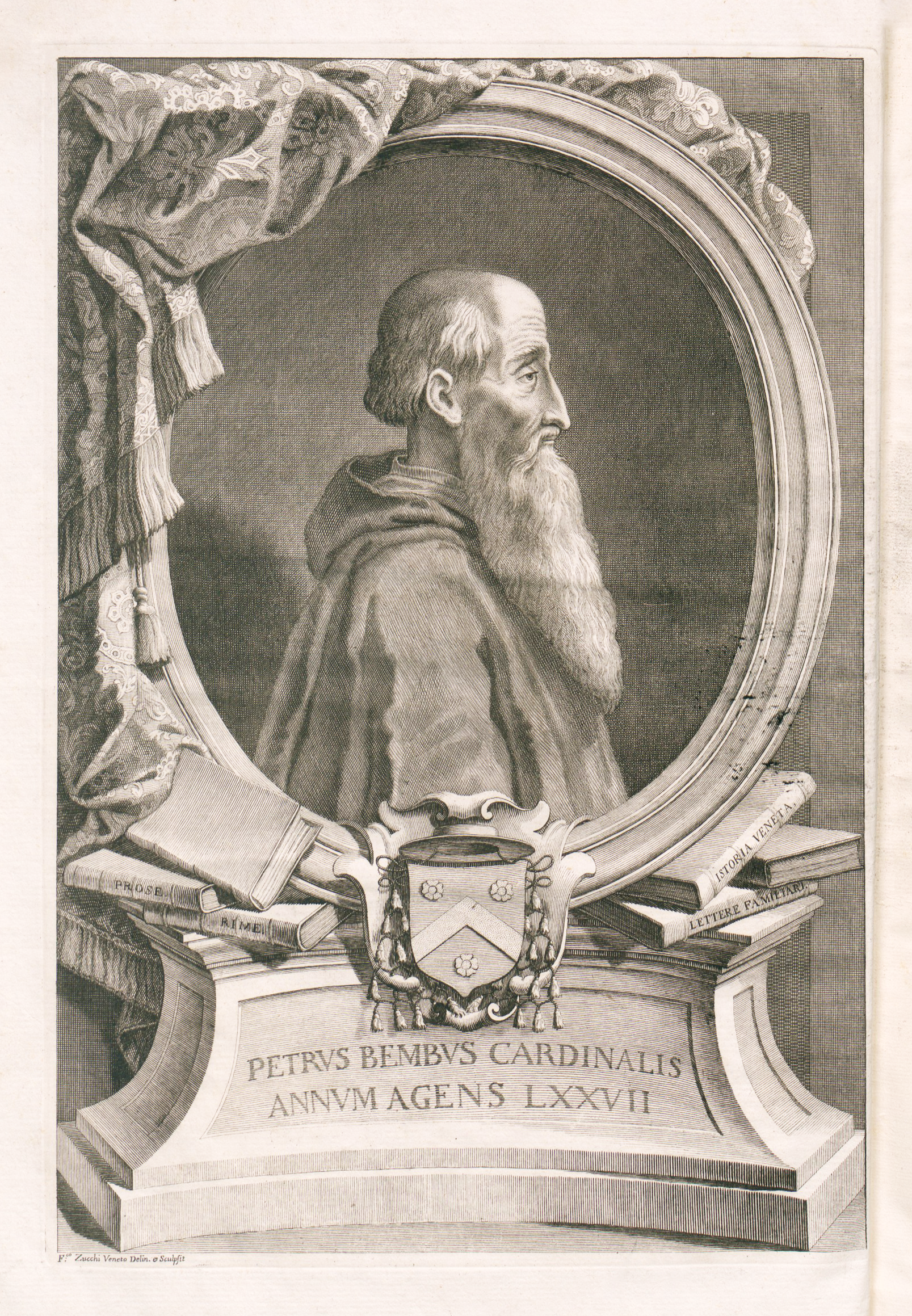
Bembo's portrait, Historia veneta (1729)

As a theoretician of literature, Pietro Bembo instilled to the Tuscan dialect the emotional effect that the Ancient Greek language (A.D. 9th–6th c.) had upon the Greek listener, by using examples from the classically composed poetry of Petrarch and the prose of Giovanni Boccaccio, whilst foregoing the difficulties of translation and composition inherent to the pluri-lingualism of Dante Alighieri's writing in The Divine Comedy (1321). His works may be considered as an early instance of the Petrarchism movement within the Renaissance literature. In the book Prose della volgar lingua (The Prose of the Vernacular Tongue, 1525) Petrarch is the model of verse composition, and Bembo gives detailed explanations of the communicational functions of rhyme and stress in the sounding of a word and the cadence of a line to achieve a balanced composition. That the specific placement of words within a line in a poem — based upon the writer's strict attention to the sonic rhythm of vowels and consonant letters — would elicit from the Italian reader and listener the range of human emotions, from grace and sweetness to gravity and grief. Bembo's rules of poetical composition in Prose of the Vernacular Tongue were crucial to the development of the techniques of musical composition that made the madrigal Italy's pre-eminent secular music in the 16th century. His theories of musical composition were disseminated by the Venetian School, by composers such as Adrian Willaert, whose book Musica nova (New Music, 1568) contains madrigal compositions derived from the linguistic theories of Bembo.

As a writer, in the book De Ætna ad Angelum Chabrielem Liber (1496), Bembo tells how he and his father, Bernardo, climbed Mount Ætna and there found snow in summertime, a reality that contradicted the Greek geographer, Strabo, who said that snow was present only in winter; nonetheless, Bembo perceptively notes: "But first-hand inquiry tells you that it lasts, as does practical experience, which is no less an authority." The typeface for De Aetna was the basis for the Monotype Corporation's "old-style serif" font called "Bembo". Bembo's edition of Tuscan Poems (1501), by Petrarch, and the work of lyric verse Terze Rime (1530), much influenced the development of the Tuscan dialect into the literary language of Italy. In Gli Asolani (The People of Asolo, 1505) Bembo explained and recommended Platonic love as superior to carnal love, despite his love affair with the married Lucrezia Borgia (1480–1519); besides dialogues, poems, and essays, Bembo published a History of Venice (1551).

As a priest, Bembo reaffirmed and promoted the Christian perfection of Renaissance humanism. Deriving all from love, or the lack thereof, Bembo's schemas were appended as supplements to the newly invented technology of printing by Aldus Manutius in his editions of The Divine Comedy in the 16th century. Bembo's refutation of the pervasive puritanical tendency to a profane dualistic gnosticism is elaborated in The People of Asolo, his third prose book, which reconciled fallen human nature by way of Platonic transcendence that is mediated by Trinitarian love; Bembo dedicated that book to his lover Lucrezia Borgia.

== Reception ==
- The character Pietro Cardinal Bembo also features prominently in Baldassare Castiglione's work The Book of the Courtier where he speaks about the nature of "Platonic" love.

== Sources ==
- Atlas, Allan W., ed. Renaissance music: music in western Europe, 1400–1600. NY: Norton, 1998. ISBN 0-393-97169-4
- James Haar, "Pietro Bembo." Grove Music Online, ed. L. Macy (Accessed 30 December 2007), (subscription access)
- James Haar, Anthony Newcomb, Massimo Ossi, Glenn Watkins, Nigel Fortune, Joseph Kerman, Jerome Roche: "Madrigal", Grove Music Online, ed. L. Macy (Accessed 30 December 2007), (subscription access)
- This entry incorporates public domain text originally from the 1911 Encyclopædia Britannica.
- Pietro Bembo, "Oratio pro litteris graecis", 2003. Edited with English translation by Nigel G. Wilson.
