= Portrait of Cardinal Pietro Bembo =

Painting by Titian

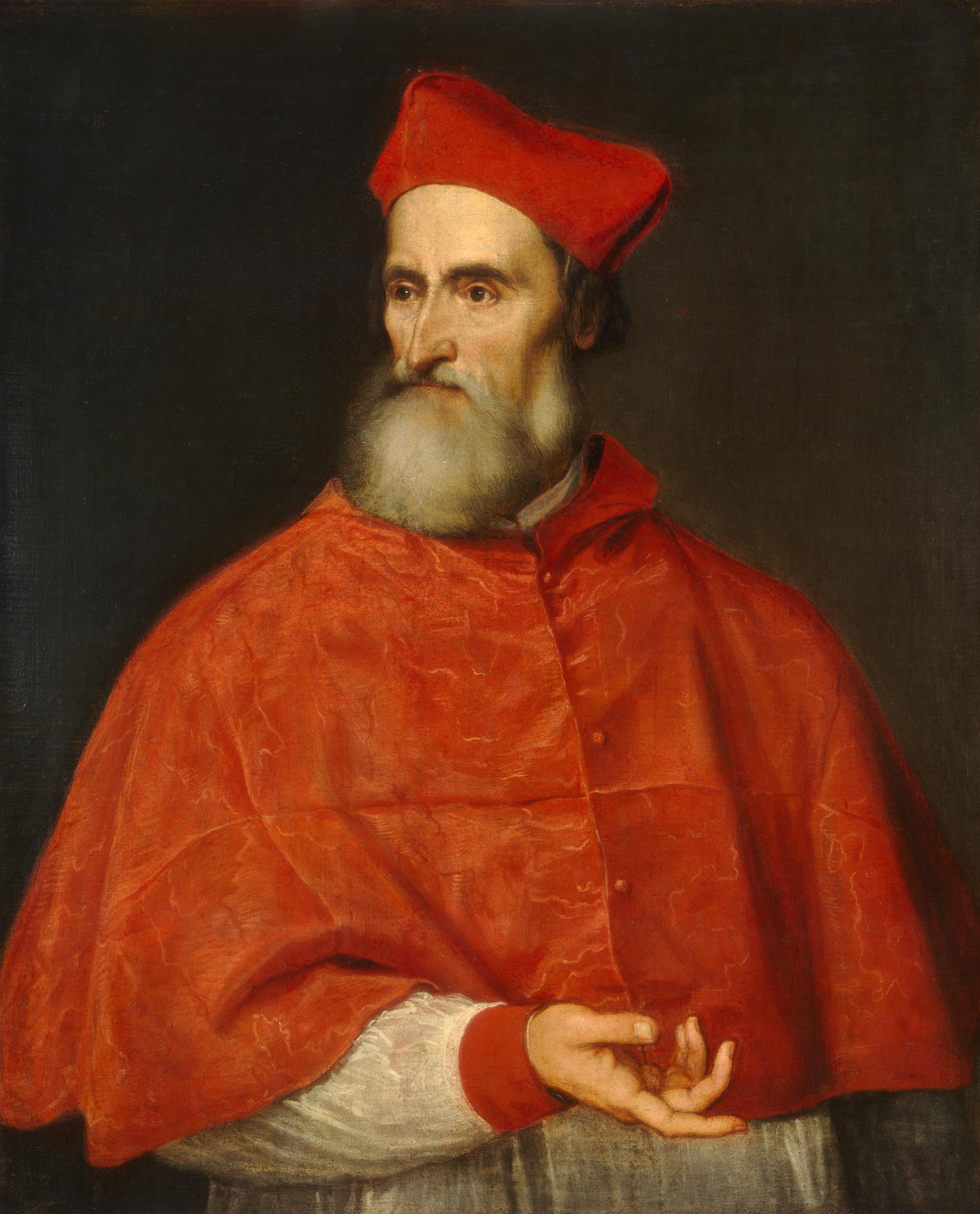
Portrait of Cardinal Pietro Bembo (1539–1540) by Titian

Portrait of Cardinal Pietro Bembo is a 1539–1540 oil on canvas painting by Titian, now in the National Gallery of Art in Washington, D.C.

== History ==
The arm's position parallel to the frame and to the edge of the cape gives volume to the figure, making it akin to a sculptural bust from ancient Rome or by Titian's contemporary Alessandro Vittoria. It is believed that Bembo himself commissioned the work in October 1539, before his transfer from Rome to Venice. The commission was probably to mark his appointment as cardinal in March 1539. The work is also probably that mentioned by the cardinal in a letter of May 1540. Titian had already painted Bembo on at least one occasion in Portrait of Pietro Bembo as an Old Man.

The painting was given to Leone Galli and was recorded in Rome in 1636 as part of cardinal Antonio Barberini's collection. It later passed to Pope Urban VIII and remained in family collections in Rome until 1890 when the art dealer Elia Volpi handled its acquisition for P. & D. Colnaghi & Co. In 1906 it was acquired by Charles M. Schwab of New York, passing to the Kress collection in 1942 and being acquired by its present owner in 1952.
