= Christ Triumphant over Sin and Death (Rubens) =

Painting by Peter Paul Rubens

- Christ Triumphant over Death and Sin, Salvator Mundi
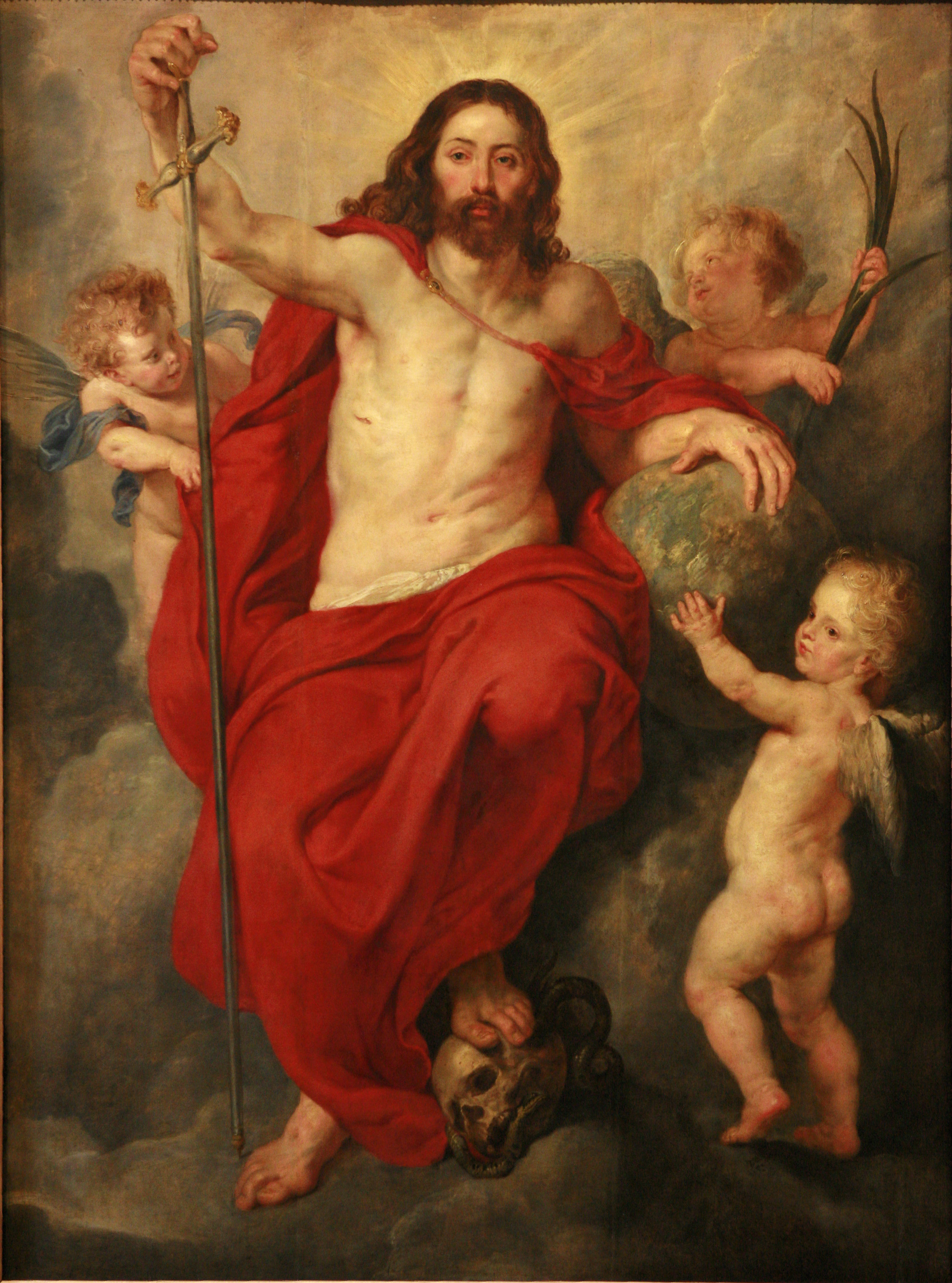
- Artist: Peter Paul Rubens
- Year: circa 1618
- Medium: oil painting on panel
- Movement: Baroque painting Christian art Allegory
- Subject: Jesus Christ triumphing over Sin and Death
- Dimensions: 175 cm × 137 cm (69 in × 54 in)
- Location: Musée des Beaux-Arts, Strasbourg
- Accession: 1891

Christ Triumphant over Sin and Death, also known as Christ Triumphant over Death and Sin, or sometimes as Salvator Mundi, is a circa 1618 oil painting by the Flemish Baroque artist Peter Paul Rubens. It is on display in the Musée des Beaux-Arts of Strasbourg, France. Its inventory number is 235.

The painting represents the allegorical victory of Christianity over Death (depicted as a skull) and Sin (depicted as a snake). It was formerly thought to have been painted around 1615, but more recent stylistic comparisons with similar Rubens works have indicated that it was more likely to have been painted slightly later, i.e. around 1618. The painting could have been commissioned for an altar in a private chapel; it was held in high esteem in the 18th century and is well document since 1745. It was bought for the museum by Wilhelm von Bode in 1890 at a sale at Christie's, and entered the collections in 1891.

Christ's head and right arm are painted in a smoother, softer texture than the rest of his body or indeed of the painting as a whole. While the work is accepted as a genuine Rubens, the customary participation of his workshop is not excluded.
