= Christ Pantocrator =

Depiction of Jesus

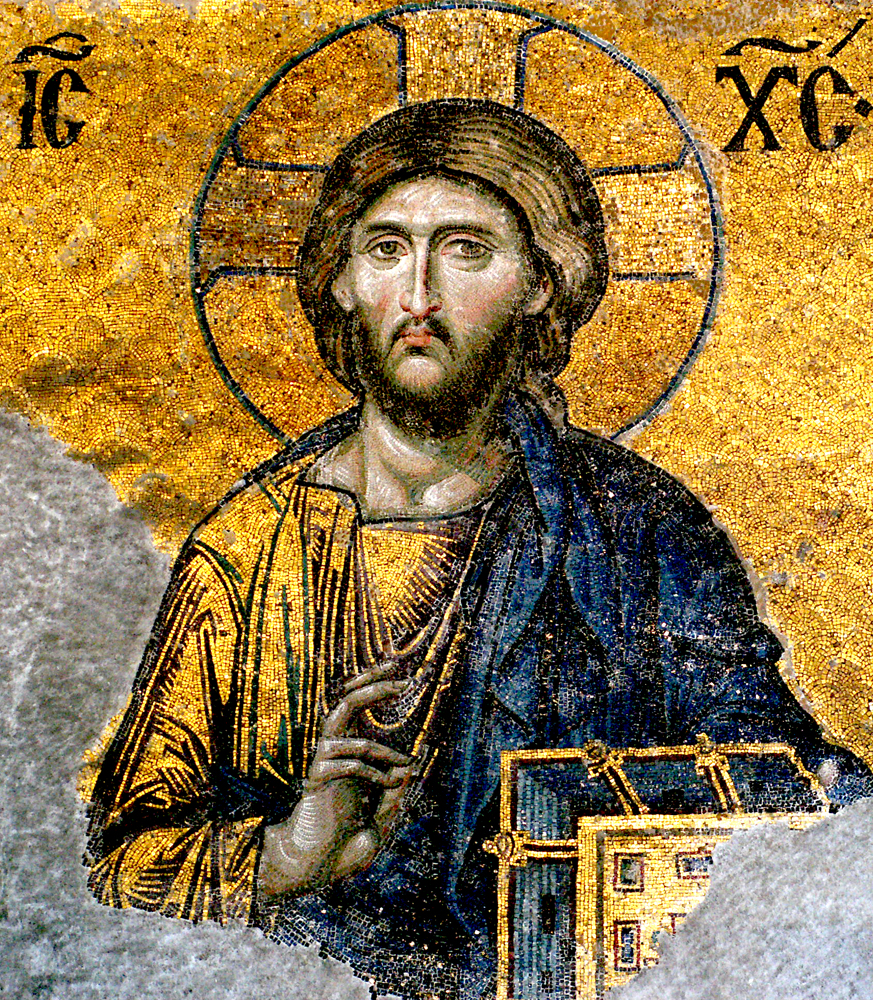
Jesus Christ Pantocrator (Detail from the deesis mosaic in Hagia Sophia, Istanbul)

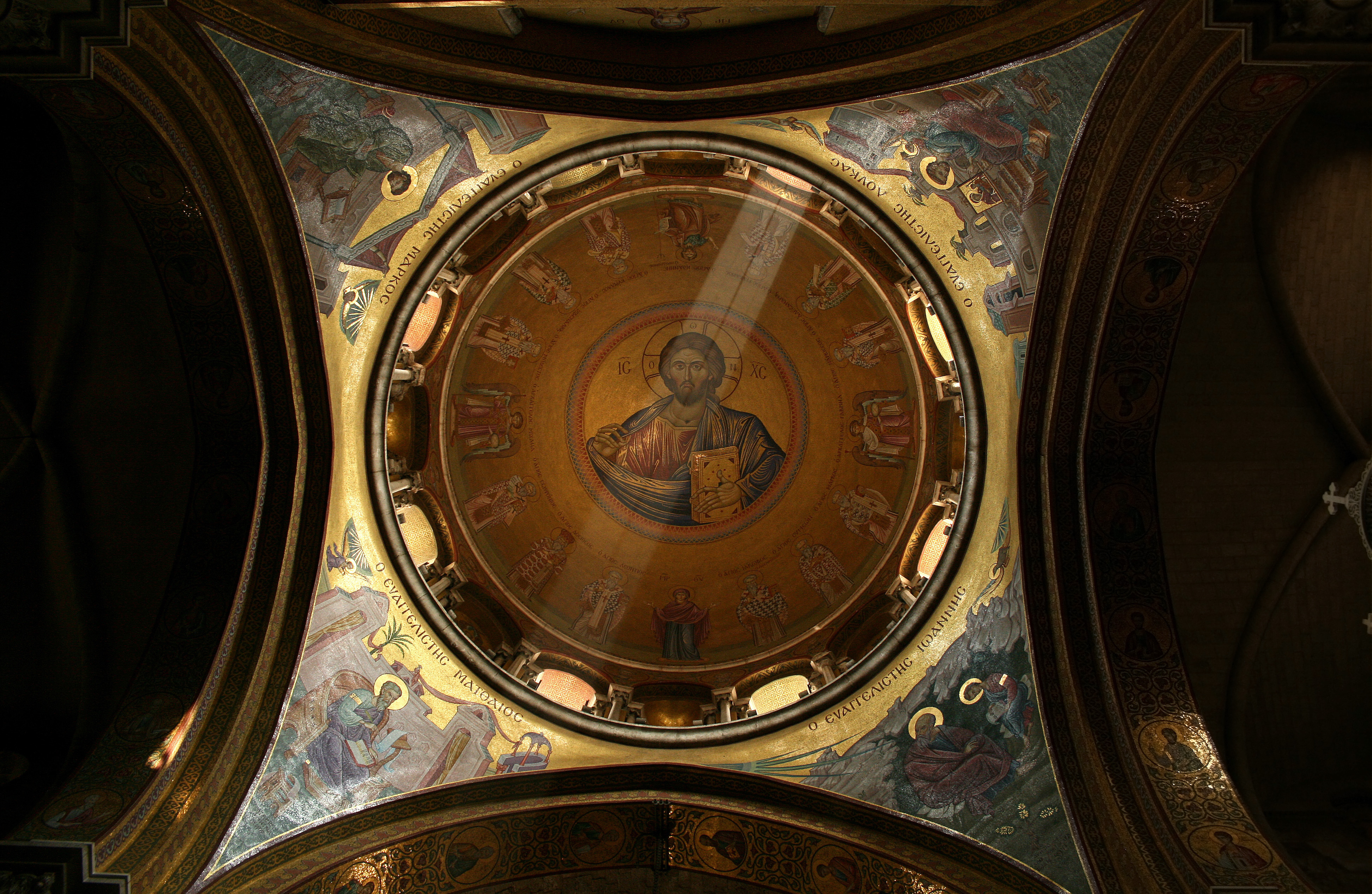
Christ Pantocrator in the dome of the Church of the Holy Sepulchre's catholicon. Church domes are a common site of Pantocrator images.

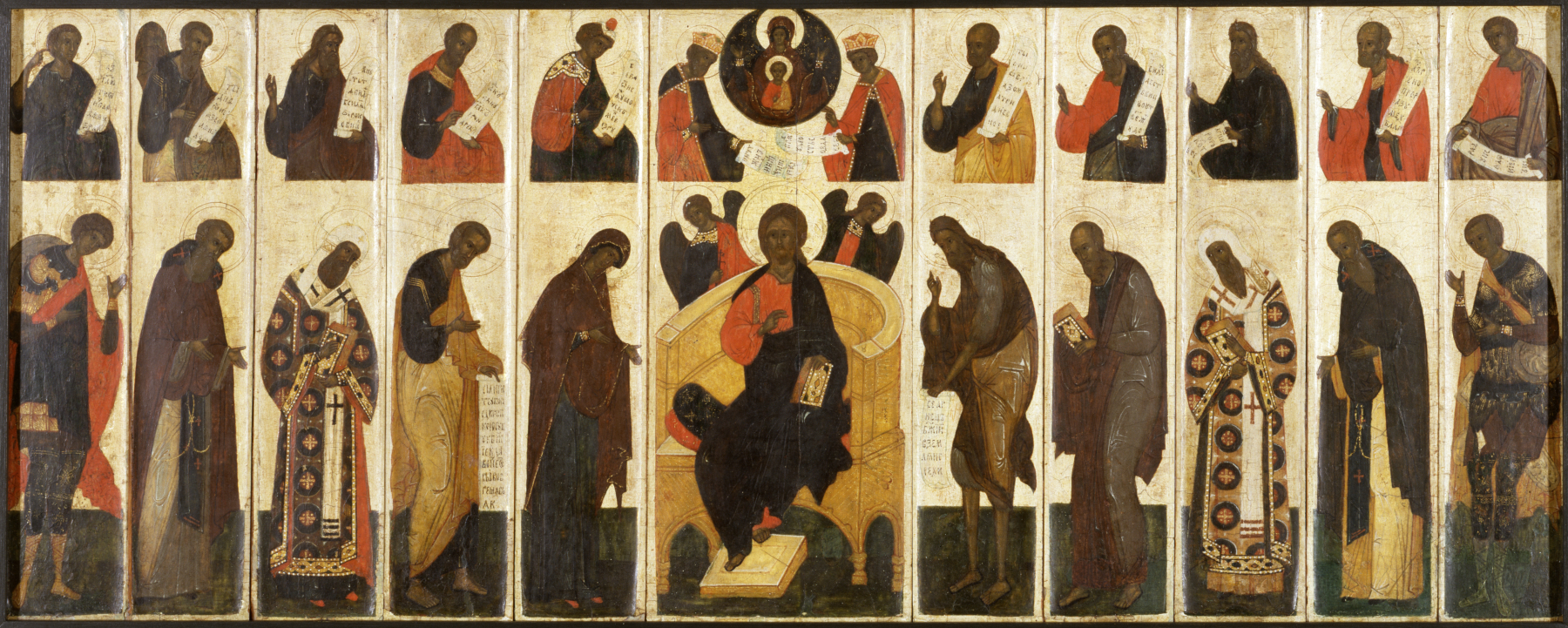
Russian Great Deesis with Prophets; 16th century; Walters Art Museum

In Christian iconography, Christ Pantocrator (Ancient Greek: Χριστὸς Παντοκράτωρ, lit. 'Christ the Almighty') is a specific depiction of Jesus. Pantocrator or Pantokrator (lit. 'ruler of all'; normally translated as 'almighty' or 'all-powerful') is derived from one of many names of God in Judaism.

The Pantocrator is largely an Eastern Orthodox, Eastern Catholic or Eastern Lutheran theological conception and is less common under that name in Latin Catholicism and Western Lutheranism. In the West, the equivalent image in art is known as Christ in Majesty, which developed a rather different iconography.

When the Hebrew Bible was translated into Greek as the Septuagint, Pantokrator was used both for YHWH Sabaoth (צבאות) (Lord of Hosts) and for El Shaddai (God Almighty). In the New Testament, Pantokrator is used once by Paul (2 Cor 6:18) and nine times in the Book of Revelation: 1:8, 4:8, 11:17, 15:3, 16:7, 16:14, 19:6, 19:15, and 21:22.

== Meaning ==
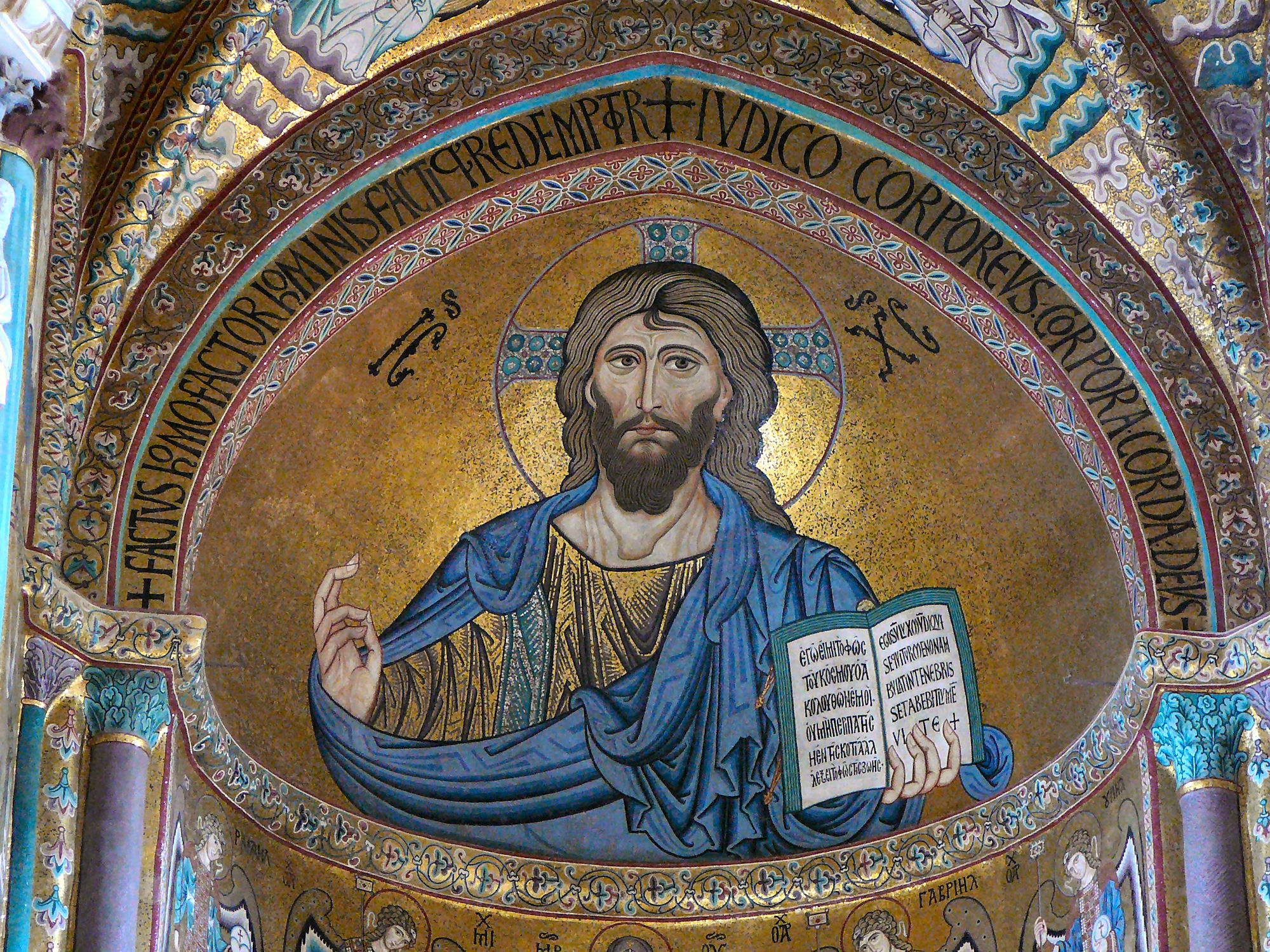
Christ Pantocrator mosaic in Byzantine style from the Cefalù Cathedral, Sicily

The most common translation of Pantocrator is "Almighty" or "All-powerful". In this understanding, Pantokrator is a compound word formed from the Greek words πᾶς, pas (GEN παντός pantos), i.e. "all" and κράτος, kratos, i.e. "strength", "might", "power". This is often understood in terms of potential power; i.e., ability to do anything, omnipotence. Christ pantocrator signifies Christ in Glory during his second coming seated on his throne.

Another, more literal translation is "Ruler of All" or, less literally, "Sustainer of the World". In this understanding, Pantokrator is a compound word formed from the Greek for "all" and the verb meaning "To accomplish something" or "to sustain something" (κρατεῖν, kratein). This translation speaks more to God's actual power; i.e., God does everything (as opposed to God can do everything).

== Iconography ==
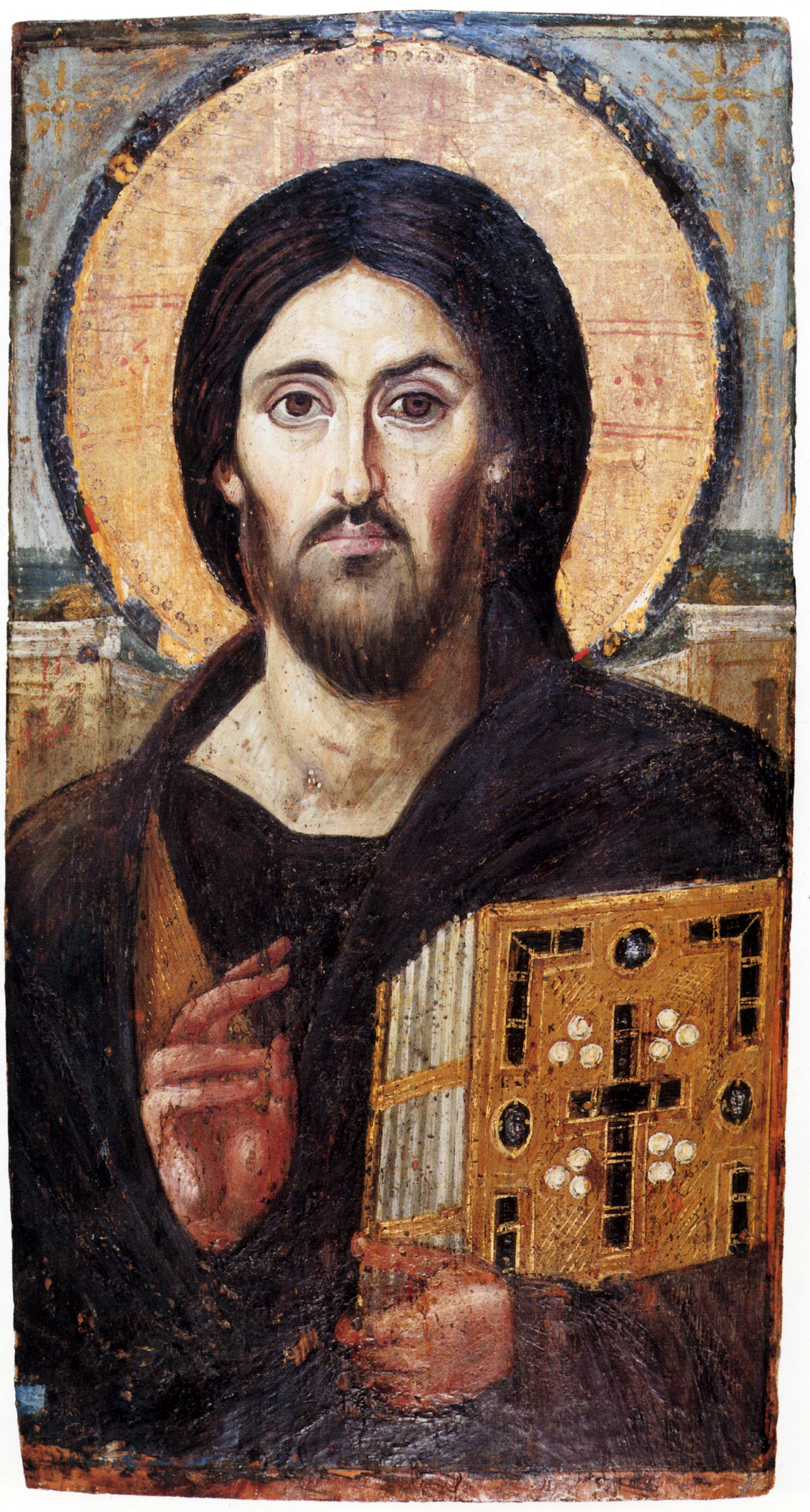
The oldest known icon of Christ Pantocrator, encaustic on panel (Saint Catherine's Monastery).

The icon of Christ Pantokrator is one of the most common religious images of Orthodox Christianity. Generally speaking, in Byzantine art church art and architecture, an iconic mosaic or fresco of Christ Pantokrator occupies the space in the central dome of the church, in the half-dome of the apse, or on the nave vault. Some scholars (Latourette 1975: 572) consider the Pantocrator a Christian adaptation of images of Zeus, such as the great statue of Zeus enthroned at Olympia. The development of the earliest stages of the icon from Roman Imperial imagery is easier to trace.

The deesis group on an iconostasis lower down in the church also centres on a Pantocrator, flanked by the Theotokos (Mary) and John the Baptist with other saints, interceding with Christ as he sits in judgement.

The image of Christ Pantocrator was one of the first images of Christ developed in the Early Christian Church and remains a central icon of the Eastern Orthodox Church. In the half-length image, Christ holds the New Testament in his left hand and makes the gesture of teaching or of blessing with his right. The typical Western Christ in Majesty is a full-length icon, with Christ typically seated on a throne. In the early Middle Ages, it usually presented Christ in a mandorla or other geometric frame, surrounded by the Four Evangelists or their symbols.

The oldest known surviving example of the icon of Christ Pantocrator was painted in encaustic on panel in the sixth or seventh century, and survived the period of destruction of images during the Iconoclastic disputes that twice racked the Eastern church, 726 to 787 and 814 to 842. It was preserved in Saint Catherine's Monastery, in the remote desert of the Sinai. The gessoed panel, finely painted using a wax medium on a wooden panel, had been coarsely overpainted around the face and hands at some time around the thirteenth century. When the overpainting was cleaned in 1962, the ancient image was revealed to be a very high-quality icon, probably produced in Constantinople.

Although it has been argued that the two different facial expressions on either side of Christ's face, unusually pronounced in the Sinai icon, depict a symbolic duality, with Christ as the bearer of mercy and grace (left half) and as the judge of unrepentant sinners (right side), technical analysis by Manolis Chatzidakis asserts that this asymmetry does not stem from a symbolic intention, but rather from pictorial techniques inherited from ancient portraiture: “The two great eyes are not completely identical either in dimension or in shape… This realistic image… is often produced by procedures which can be considered as ‘clichés d'atelier’.” Furthermore, from the perspective of art criticism, Kurt Weitzmann argues that the differing facial features on either side emphasize Jesus' human nature.

The icon, traditionally half-length when in a semi-dome, which became adopted for panel icons also, depicts Christ fully frontal with a somewhat melancholy and stern aspect, with the right hand raised in blessing or, in the early encaustic panel at Saint Catherine's Monastery, the conventional rhetorical gesture that represents teaching. The left hand holds a closed book with a richly decorated cover featuring the Cross, representing the Gospels. An icon where Christ has an open book is called "Christ the Teacher", a variant of the Pantocrator. Christ is bearded, his brown hair centrally parted, and his head is surrounded by a halo. The icon usually has a gold ground comparable to the gilded grounds of Byzantine mosaics.

Often, the name of Christ is written on each side of the halo, as IC and XC. Christ's fingers are depicted in a pose that represents the letters IC, X and C, thereby making the Christogram ICXC (for "Jesus Christ"). The IC is composed of the Greek characters iota (Ι) and lunate sigma (C; instead of Σ, ς)—the first and last letters of 'Jesus' in Greek (Ἰησοῦς); in XC the letters are chi (Χ) and again the lunate sigma—the first and last letters of 'Christ' in Greek (Χριστός).

In many cases, Christ has a cruciform halo inscribed with the letters Ο Ω Ν, i.e. ὁ ὤν "The Existing One".

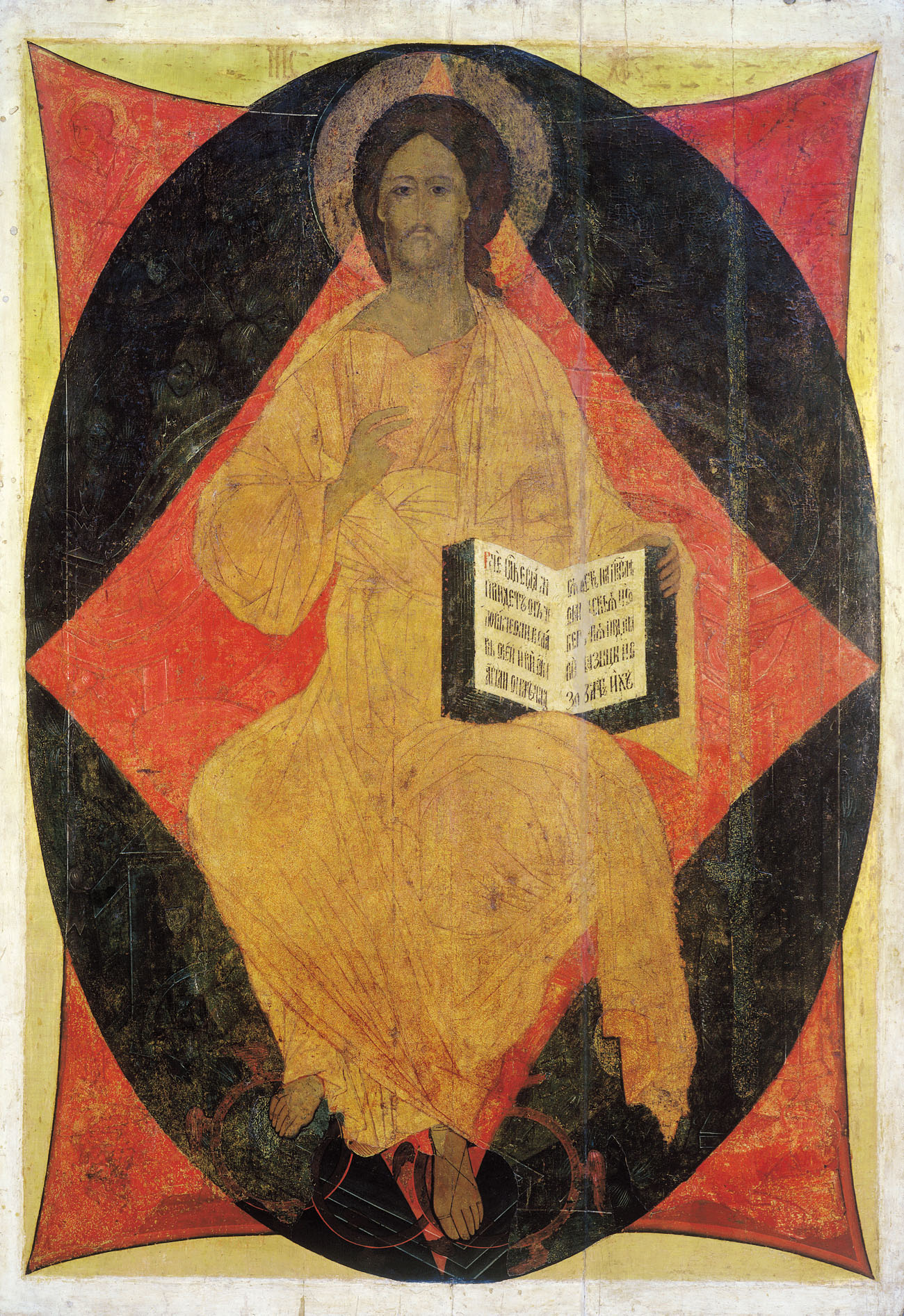
Spas v silach type, Moscow, 1408, 314 × 220 cm

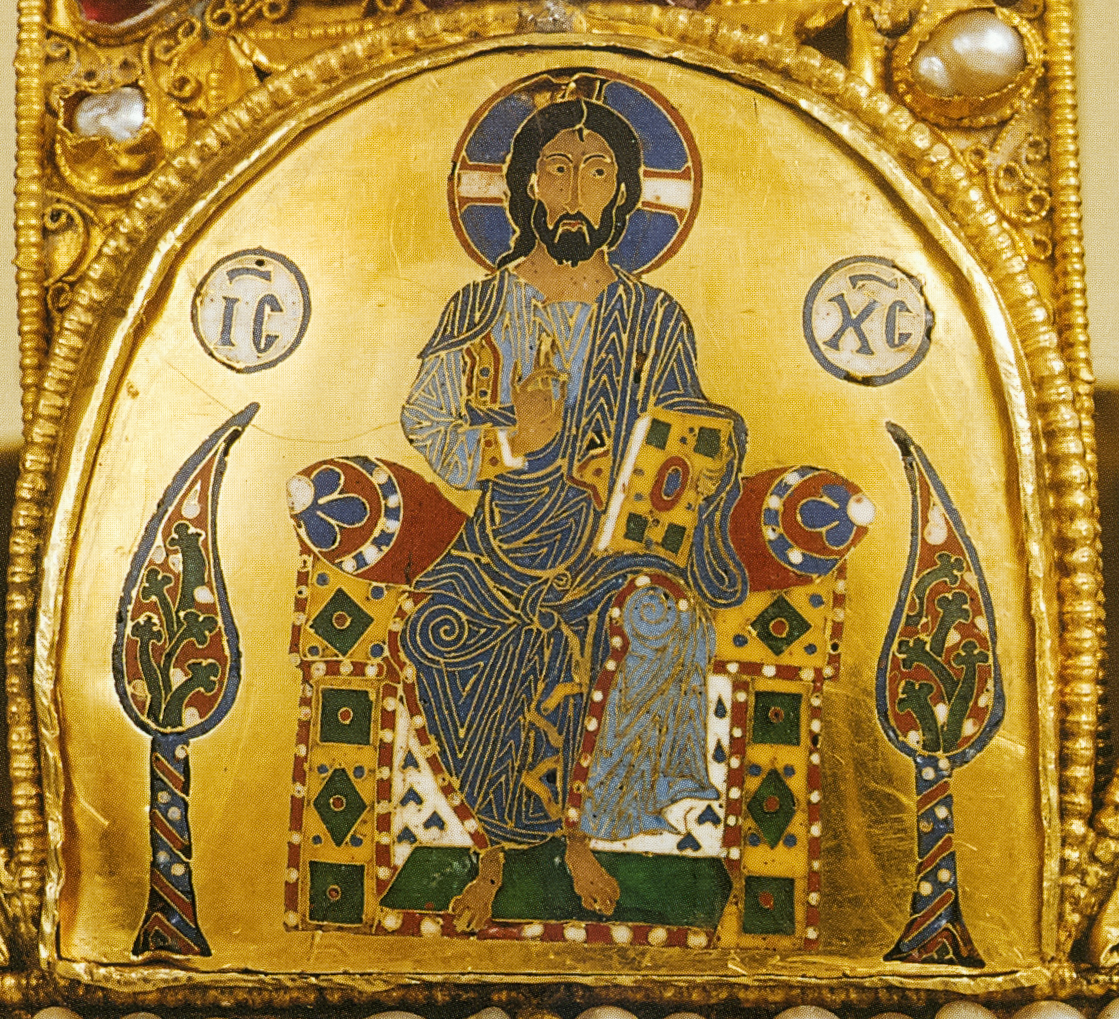
The Pantokrator on the Hungarian Holy Crown, c. 1075

Constantinople, 14th century

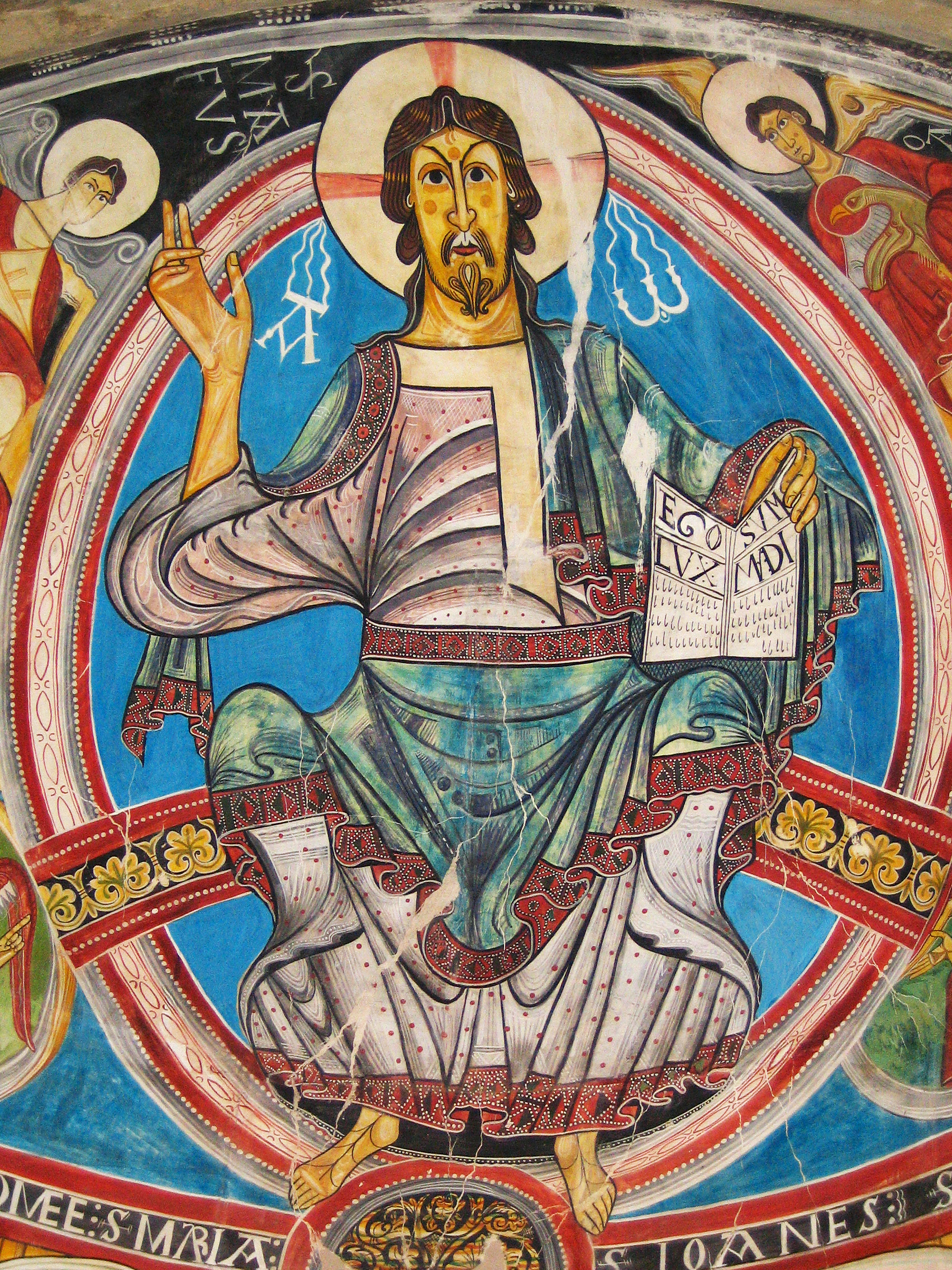
Pantocràtor de Taüll, Sant Climent de Taüll Church, Catalonia. (Now at MNAC-Museu Nacional d'Art de Catalunya, Barcelona)

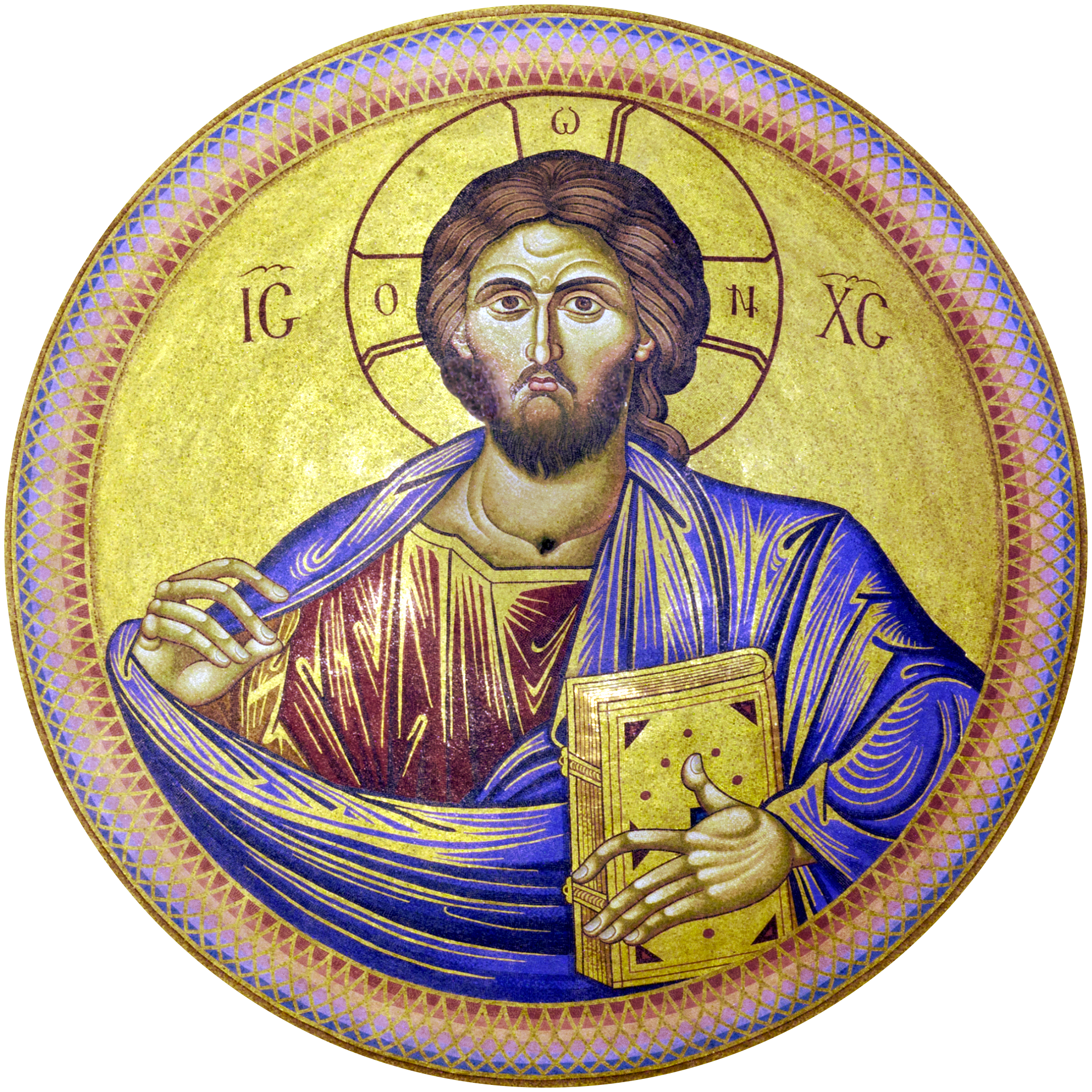
Christ Pantocrator mosaic from the dome of the Church of the Holy Sepulchre in Jerusalem

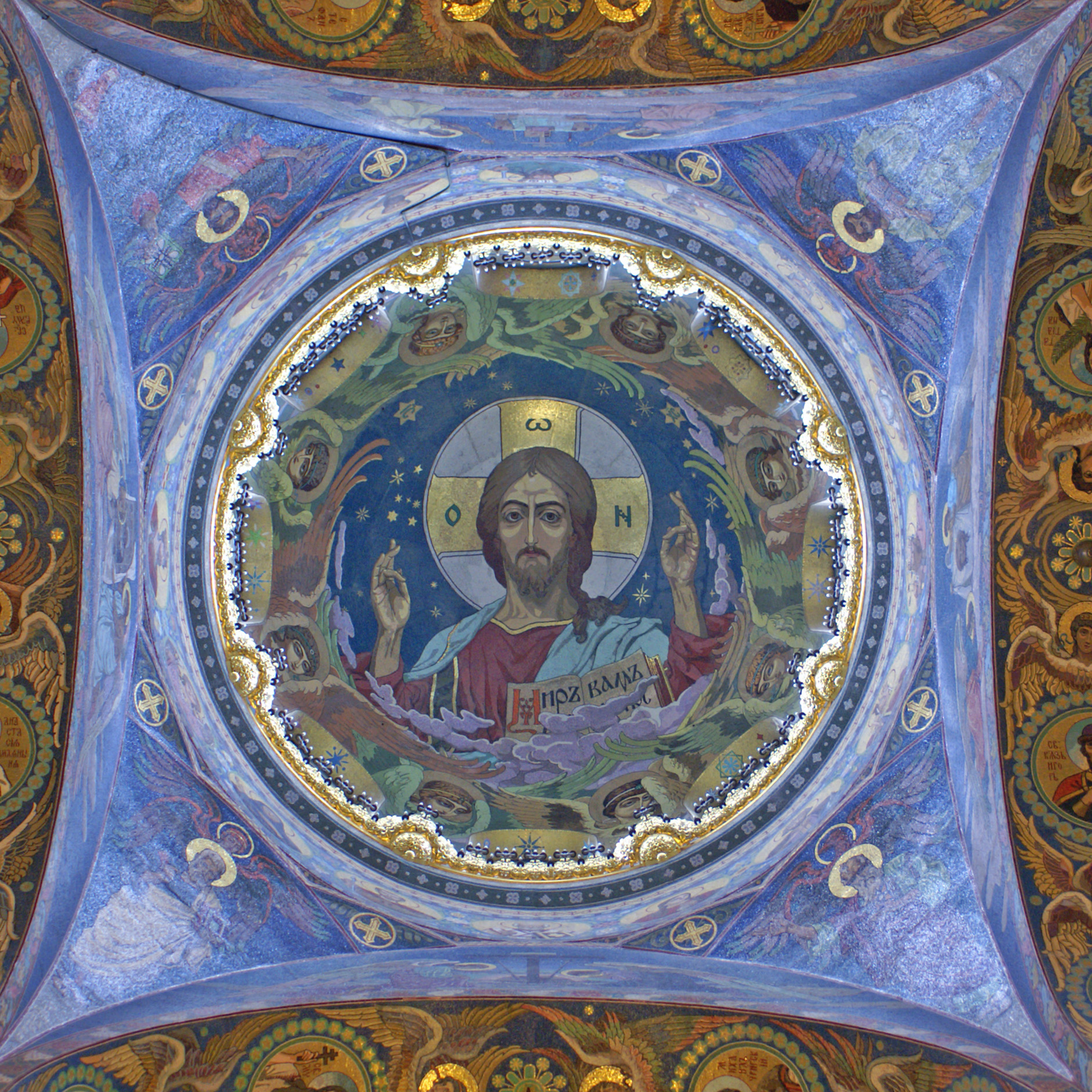
Christ Pantocrator inside the dome of Church of the Saviour on the Blood (Храм Спаса на Крови), St. Petersburg

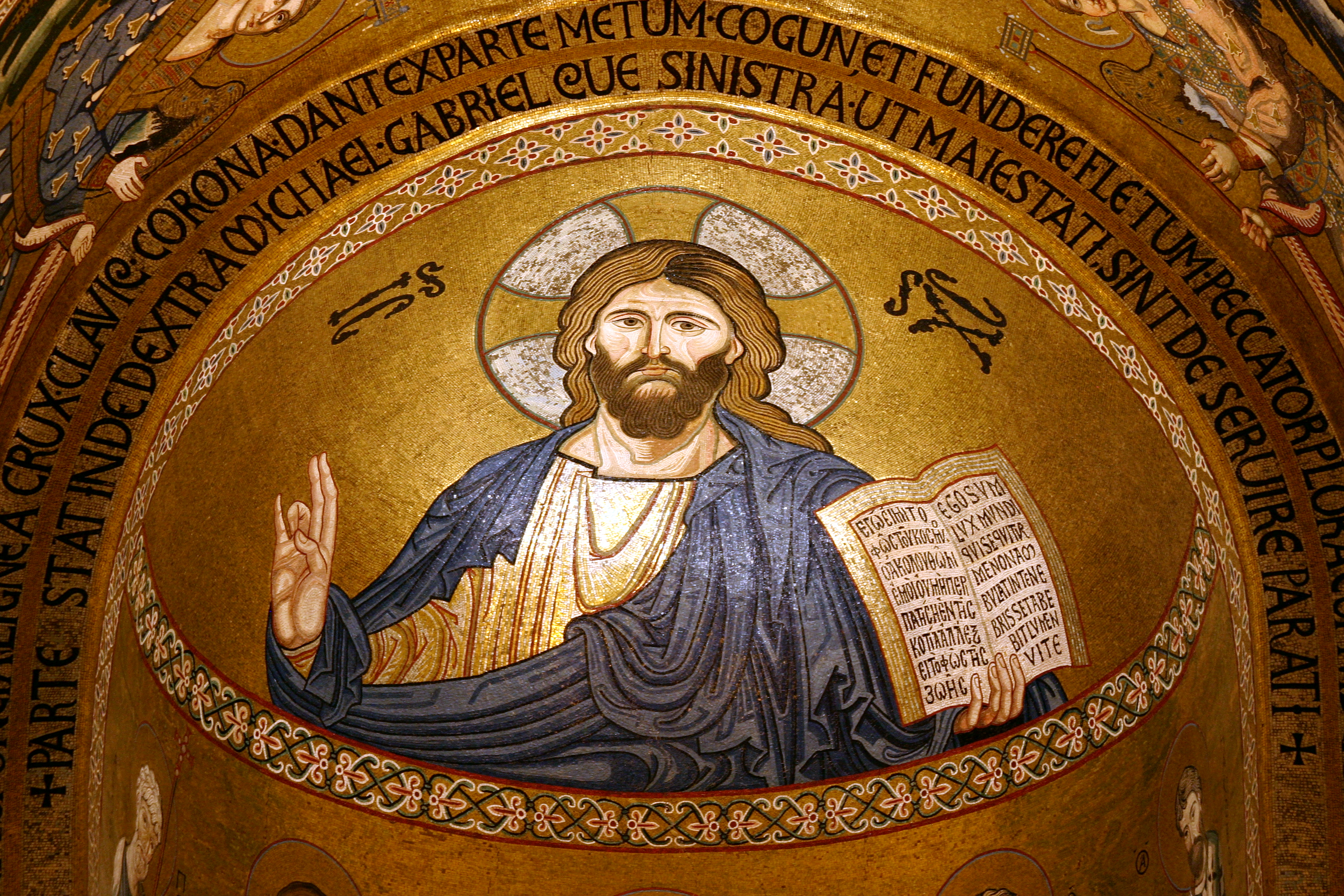
Mosaic of Palatine Chapel in Palermo

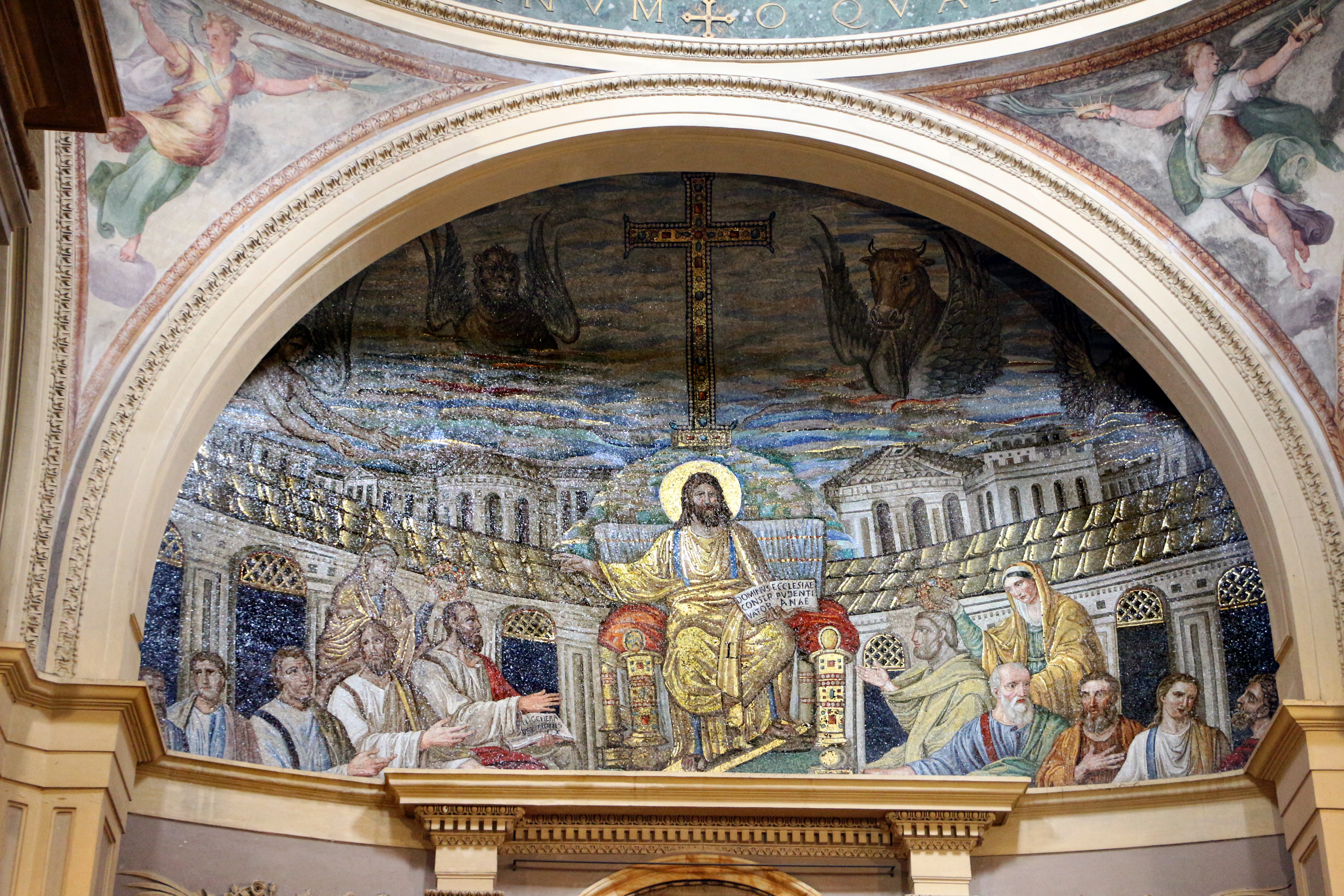
Christ Pantocrator in the church of Santa Pudenziana in Rome, Roman mosaic, c. 410 AD

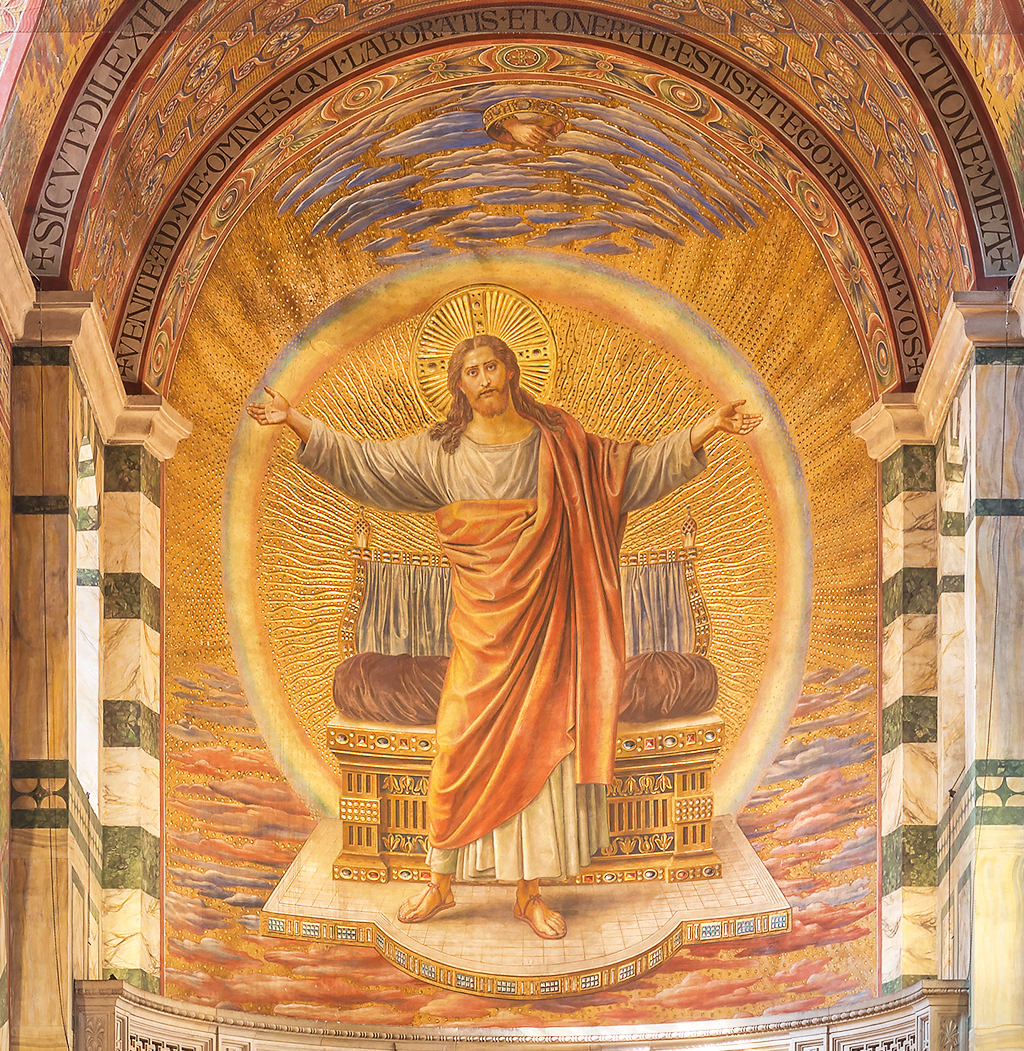
Christ Pantocrator inside the Sacred Heart Church (Berlin), c. 1900

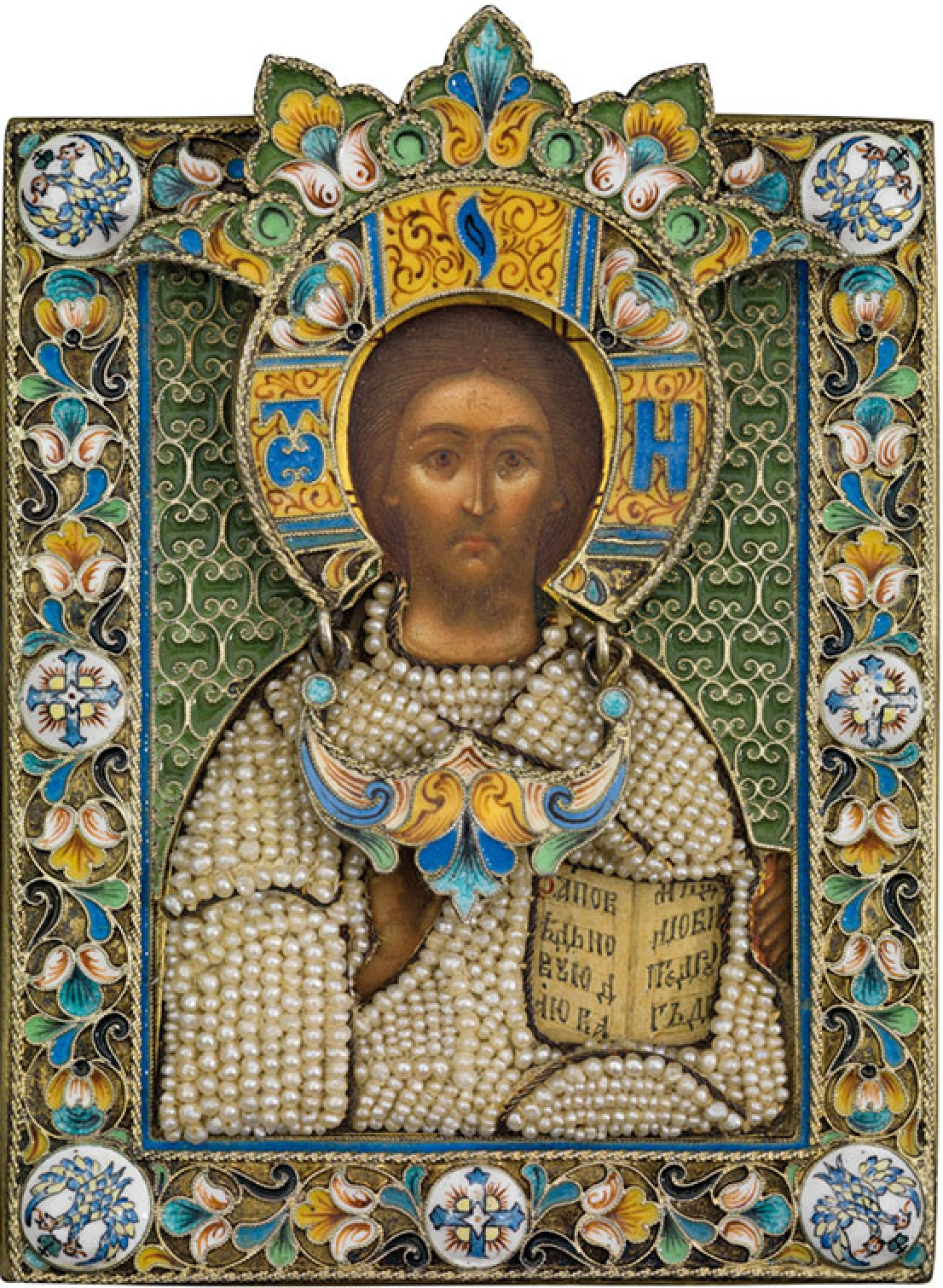
A miniature Russian icon of Christ Pantocrator, richly decorated with pearls and enamel, c. 1899–1908

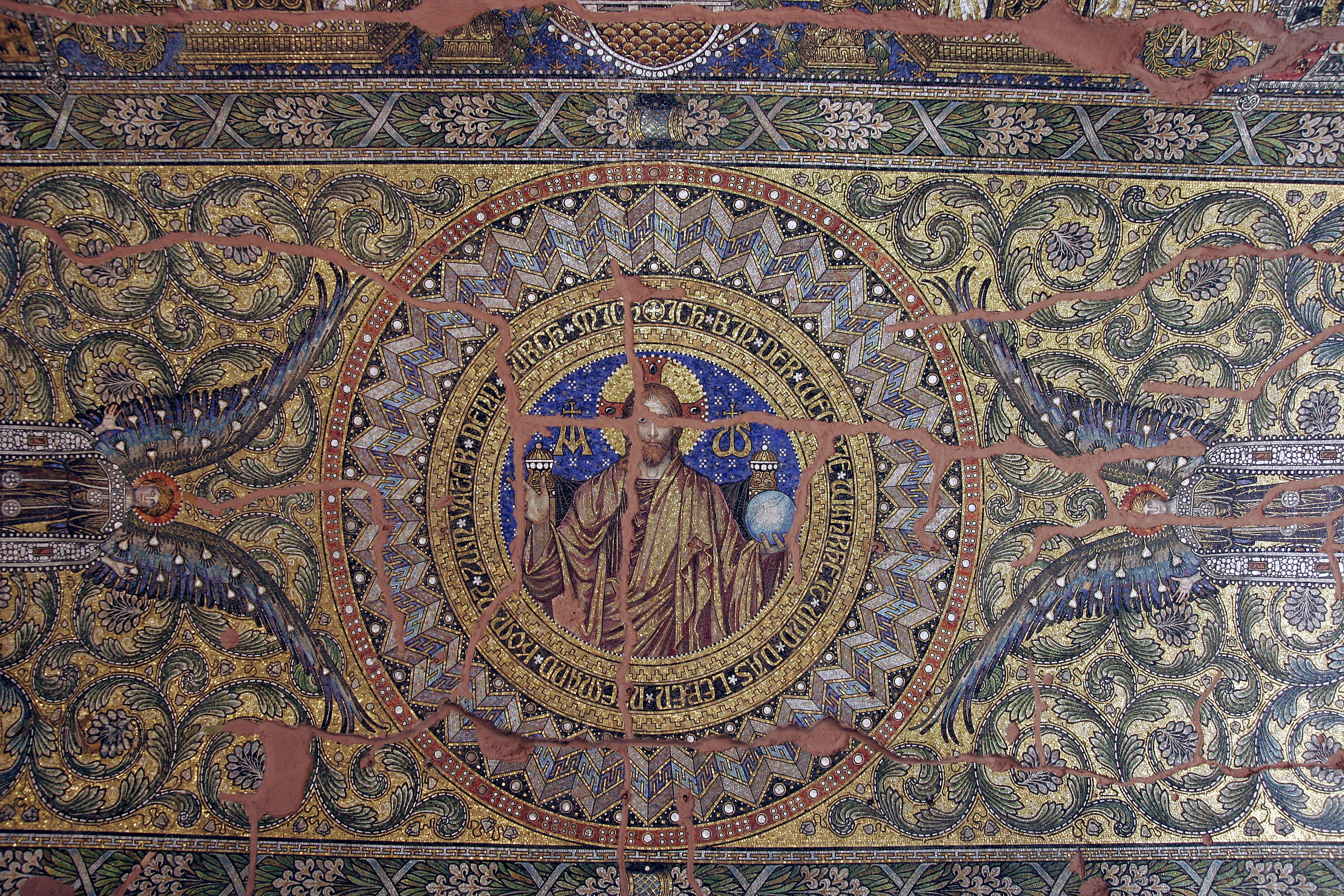
Damaged mosaic of Christ Pantocrator inside the Kaiser Wilhelm Memorial Church, Berlin c. 1895

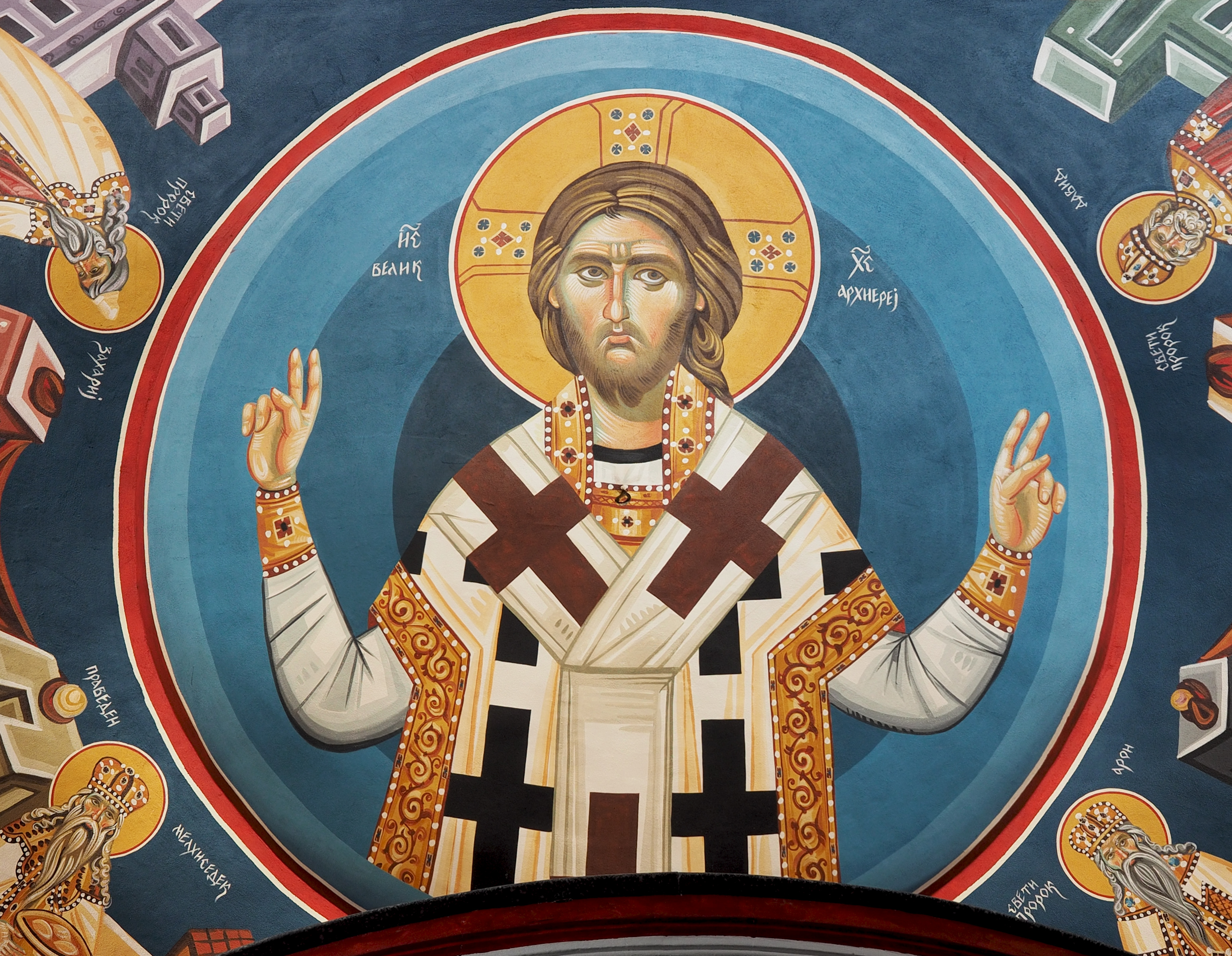
Roof fresco of Christ Pantocrator, Nativity of the Theotokos Church, Bitola, North Macedonia

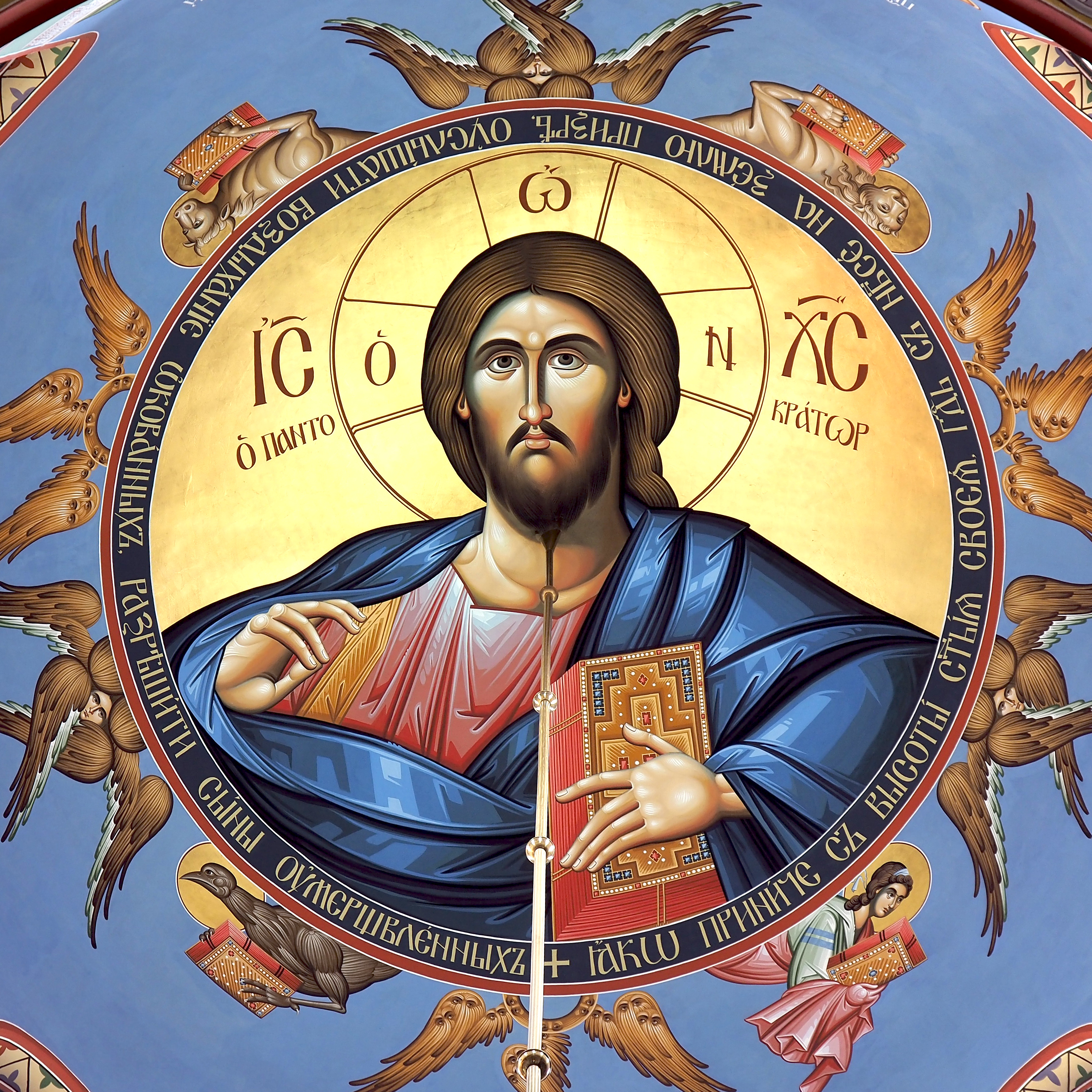
Christ Pantocrator in the Orthodox Church of St. Alexander Nevsky, Belgrade, Serbia

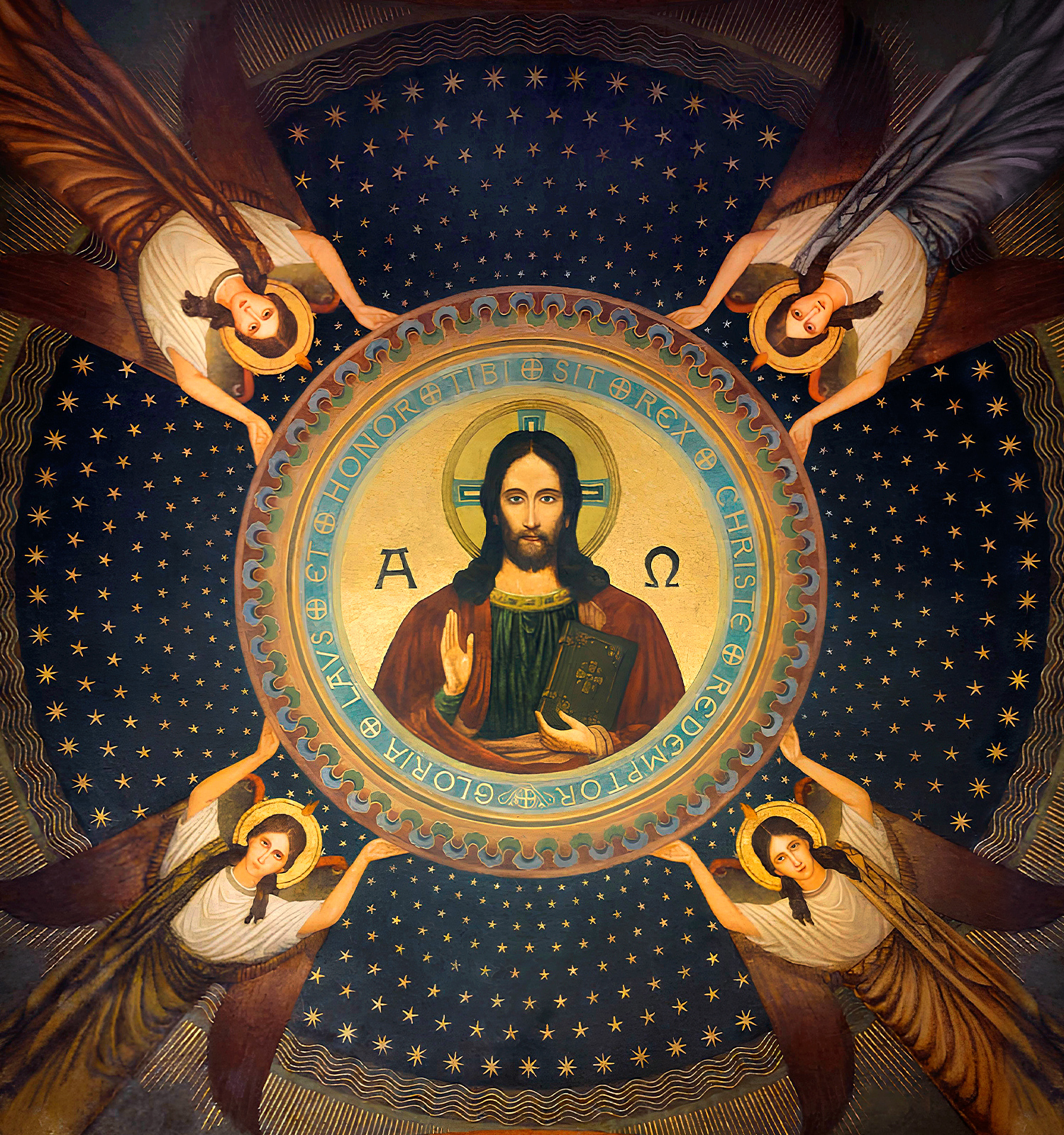
Christ Pantocrator painted by Adelbert Gresnigt, Beuron Art School Mosteiro de São Bento (São Paulo), Brazil

=== Russian types ===
The Spas Smolensky (Smolensk Saviour) is one Russian type, with a full-length standing Christ. A large version is over one of the gateways into the Moscow Kremlin, beneath the Spasskaya Tower (or "Saviour Tower").

The Spas v silach is a seated full length type.

== Statuary ==
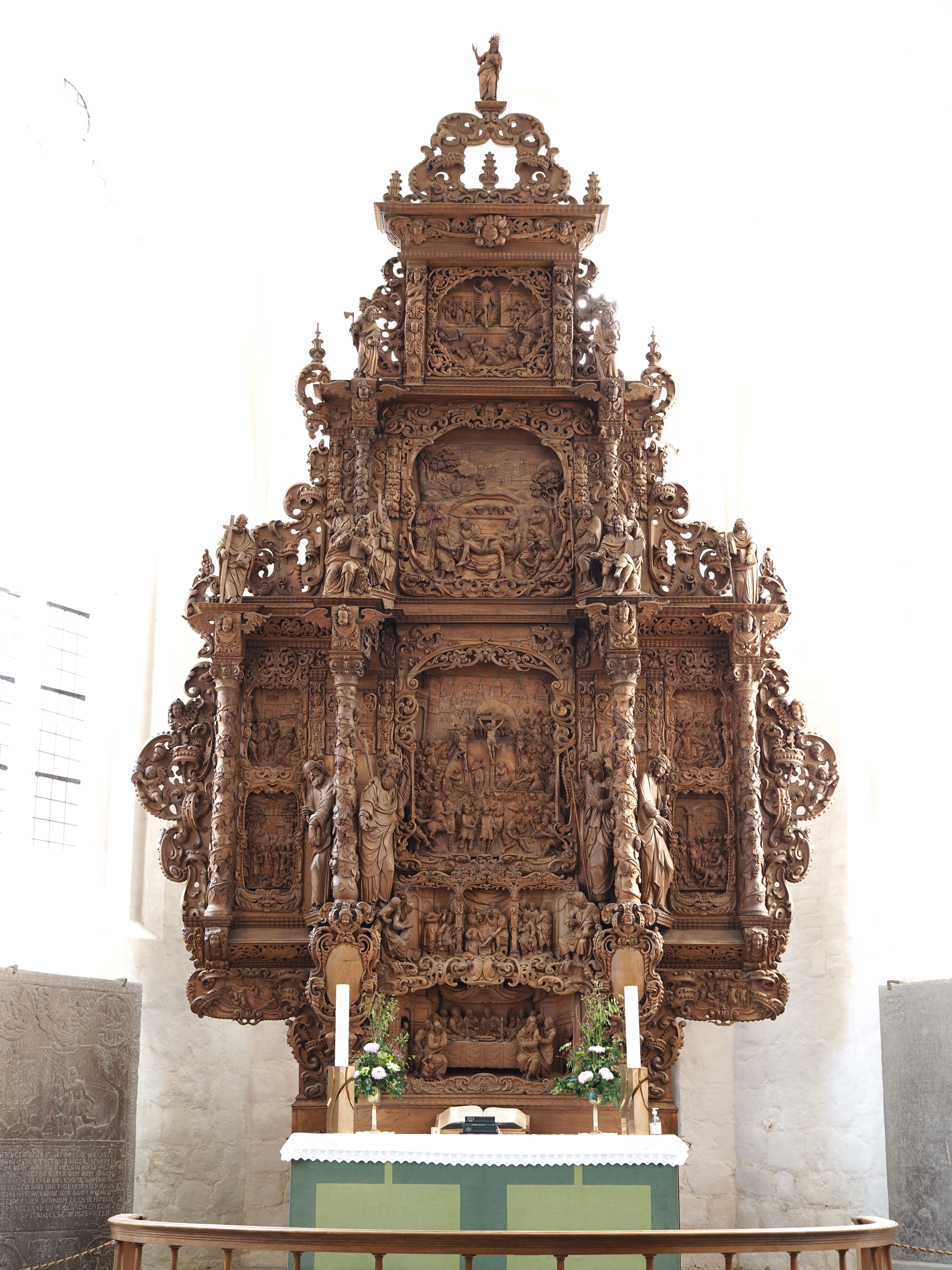
The high altar of Saint Martin's Lutheran Church in Næstved, Denmark with a statue of Christ Pantocrator at the top of the altarpiece

In certain churches of Western Christianity, Christ Pantocrator has been depicted. A prominent example is the topmost statue in the ornate altarpiece of Saint Martin's Lutheran Church in Næstved.

== See also ==
- Christ the Redeemer
- Monumento al Divino Salvador del Mundo
- Salvator Mundi
- Transfiguration of Jesus
- Symbolism of domes
