= Christ Pantocrator (Sinai) =

Oldest icon of Jesus

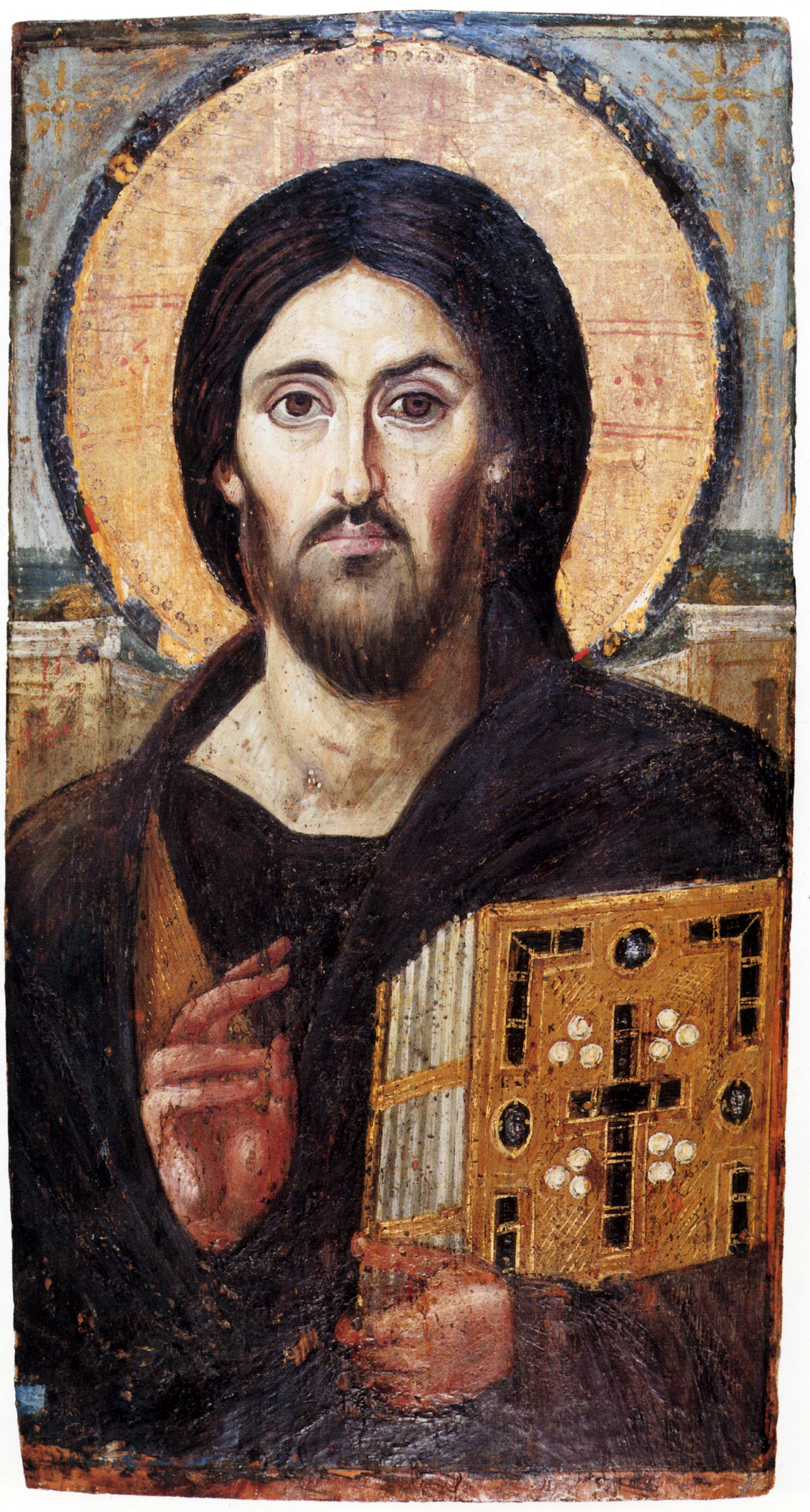
Christ Pantocrator (6th century AD), from Saint Catherine's Monastery, in Sinai, Egypt

The Christ Pantocrator of Saint Catherine's Monastery is one of the oldest Byzantine religious icons, dating from the 6th century AD. The earliest known surviving depiction of Jesus Christ as Pantocrator (literally ruler of all), it is regarded by historians and scholars among the most important and recognizable works in the study of Byzantine art as well as Eastern Orthodox and Eastern Catholic Christianity.

== Background ==
For a time, the icon was thought to have been dated from the 13th century, since it had been almost completely painted over at that time. It was concluded in 1962 that it is from the mid-sixth century, although the exact date of production is still unknown. When Saint Catherine's Monastery was founded by the Byzantine emperor Justinian I, late in his reign, between 548 and 565, it enjoyed imperial patronage and donations from Justinian and his court, with the Christ Pantocrator icon having been one of the many possible imperial gifts. Because of this, it is generally believed to have been produced in the Byzantine capital of Constantinople.

== Interpretation and meaning ==
Many believe that the icon represents the dual nature of Christ, illustrating traits of both man and God, perhaps influenced by the aftermath of the ecumenical councils of the previous century at Ephesus and Chalcedon. Art historian Kurt Weitzmann interprets that while the frontal composition represents his divine nature, the avoidance of strict symmetry in the facial features (such as the variation in the eyebrows and pupils) emphasizes Christ's "vitality" and human nature. His right hand is shown opening outward, signifying his gift of blessing, while the left hand and arm are clutching a thick Gospel book.

Some scholars have suggested the icon at Sinai could have been a possible representation of the Kamouliana icon of Christ or of the famous icon of Christ of the Chalke Gate, an image which was destroyed twice during the first and second waves of Byzantine Iconoclasm—first in 726, and again in 814—and thus its connection with the Christ Pantocrator is difficult to confirm.

== Description and production ==
With a height of 84 cm, width of 45.5 cm, and a thickness of 1.2 cm, the icon was originally taller and wider before its top and sides were cut. Otherwise, there is only one spot with major damage, a large portion of Christ's hair on his left side, including his left ear and shoulder. The original encaustic surface has continually been preserved in excellent condition overall.

As with many of the early icons from Sinai, the Christ Pantocrator was created by using encaustic—a medium using hot wax paint—that was rare in the Byzantine world after the iconoclastic controversies of the eighth and ninth centuries. The monastery at Sinai is the only place where a substantial number of encaustic icons have been preserved, some dating from as early as the sixth century. During the period of Byzantine Iconoclasm, the production of Orthodox icons continued at Sinai, as they were being destroyed in Constantinople.

== Survival from Byzantine iconoclasm and aftermath ==
The Muslim Arabs quickly took control of the southern Levant, including Egypt and Sinai, severing the monastery of Saint Catherine's ties with Constantinople in 640 AD. Thus by the era of iconoclasm initiated by Emperor Leo III in 726, the Monastery of Saint Catherine had already been under Muslim rule for nearly a century and was not destroyed. Furthermore, the location of St. Catherine's in the rocky desert of Sinai, far away from any major trade or military route, kept the religious art housed within the monastery away from raiders as well as conquering armies. Today, the monastery houses a collection of over 2,000 icons, dating from the sixth century to modern times.

== Bibliography ==
- Chatzidakis, Manolis and Walters, Gerry. "An Encaustic Icon of Christ at Sinai." The Art Bulletin 49, No. 3 (1967): 197–208.
- Cormack, Robin. Oxford History of Art: Byzantine Art. Oxford: Oxford University Press, 2000.
- Galey, John, Forsyth, George, and Weitzmann, Kurt. Sinai and the Monastery of St. Catherine, Doubleday, New York, 1980, ISBN 0385171102
- Manaphēs, Kōnstantinos A. Sinai: Treasures of the Monastery of Saint Catherine. Athens: Ekdotike Athenon, 1990.
- Weitzmann, Kurt. "The Mosaic in St. Catherine's Monastery on Mount Sinai." Proceedings of the American Philosophical Society 110, No. 6 (Dec. 1966): 392–405.
- Weitzmann, Kurt. The Monastery of Saint Catherine at Mount Sinai, the Icons. Princeton, New Jersey: Princeton University Press, 1976.
