= Salvator Mundi (Palma Vecchio) =

Painiting by Jacopo Negretti (aka Palma Vecchio)

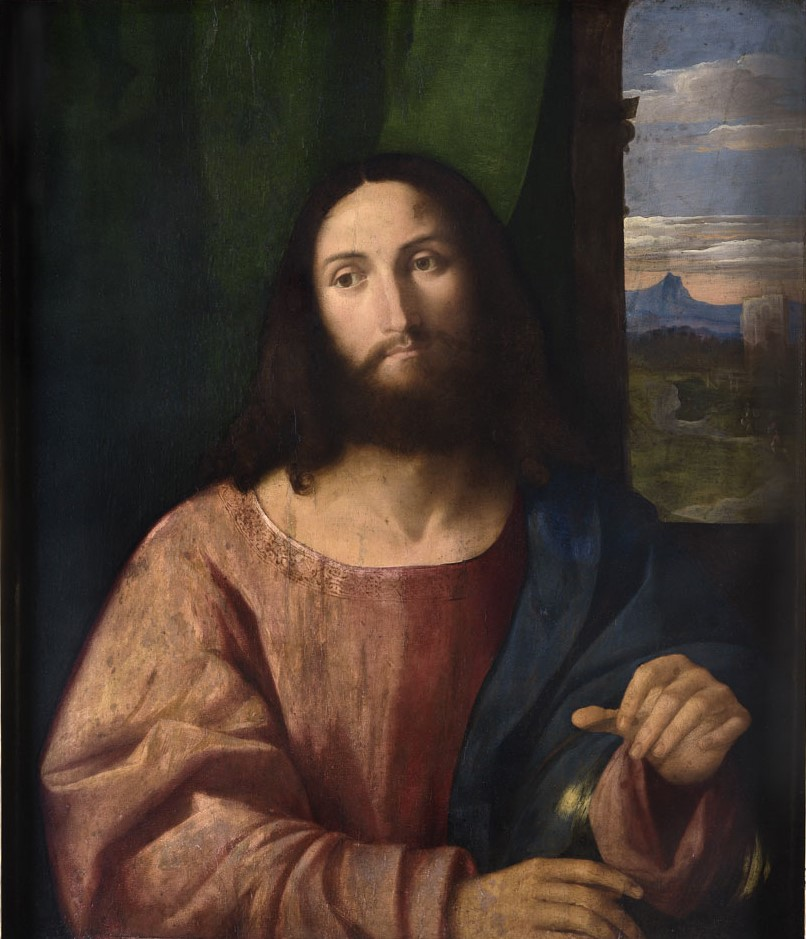
- Artist: Palma Vecchio
- Year: c. 1518-1522
- Medium: oil painting on panel (poplar)
- Movement: Italian Renaissance; Catholic art Venetian painting
- Subject: Salvator Mundi
- Dimensions: 74 cm × 63 cm (29 in × 25 in)
- Location: Musée des Beaux-Arts, Strasbourg
- Accession: 1898

Salvator Mundi (Jesus Christ, Saviour of the World) is a religious painting by Italian Renaissance artist Palma Vecchio, dated to c. 1518-1522. It is on display in the Musée des Beaux-Arts of Strasbourg, France (inventory number 585).

== History ==
The painting was bought in 1898 by Wilhelm von Bode, from a collection in Padua belonging to the estate of the Giustiniani and Barbarigo families. It had long been believed to be a work by Giorgione, and the first attribution to Palma was published in 1875 by Pietro Selvatico. Bernard Berenson, and some other 20th-century art historians, disputed it, but it has been universally accepted since the 1992 publication of the monograph by Philip Rylands.

The pose and the face of Jesus Christ are reminiscent of the slightly earlier Portrait of a Poet, now in the National Gallery. He is holding a transparent globe, almost invisible to the naked eye, and sitting in front of a green curtain opening on a landscape. This devotional work, executed in the manner of Venetian portrait painting, was very popular in its day; six copies or variations have survived (National Museum, Wrocław; Agnes Etherington Art Centre, Kingston; etc.).
