= Salvator Mundi =

Subject in iconography depicting Christ

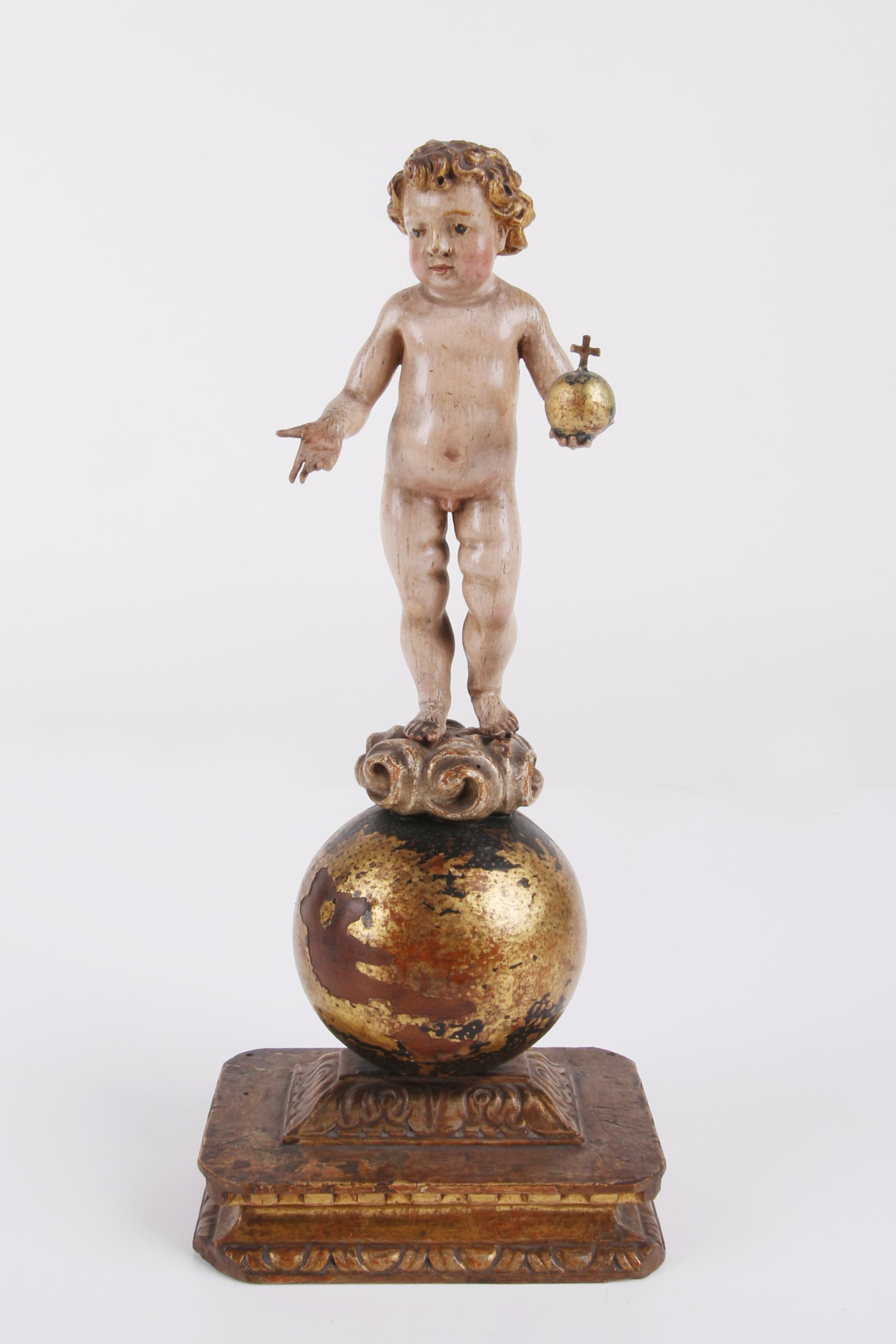
Child Jesus Salvator Mundi (17th century), Portugal

Salvator Mundi, Latin for Saviour of the World, is a subject in iconography depicting Christ with his right hand raised in blessing and his left hand holding an orb (frequently surmounted by a cross), known as a globus cruciger. The latter symbolizes the Earth, and the whole composition has strong eschatological undertones.

The theme is associated with Early Netherlandish painting and the painters of the Northern Renaissance. However, an Italian painting using the same theme has been attributed to Leonardo da Vinci.

== Background ==
The theme was made popular by Northern painters such as Jan van Eyck, Hans Memling, and Albrecht Dürer. There are also several versions of the theme attributed to Titian, notably the one in the Hermitage Museum.

One painting of the subject, simply titled Salvator Mundi, was attributed or reattributed to Leonardo da Vinci in 2011. This painting disappeared from 1763 until 1900 when it was acquired from Sir Charles Robinson. It was at the time thought to be a work by Leonardo's follower, Bernardino Luini, and was purchased for the Doughty House in Richmond, London by Sir Francis Cook. By this time Christ's face and hair had been extensively repainted. A photograph taken in 1912 records the work's altered appearance. In 2017, this painting sold at auction for US$ 450,300,000, the highest price ever paid for a painting.

== Arts ==
Salvator Mundi has been represented as a central motif in artworks since the 15th century such as:

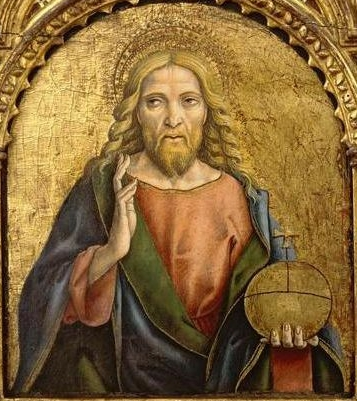
Carlo Crivelli, Cristo benedicente (c. 1472), El Paso Museum of Art

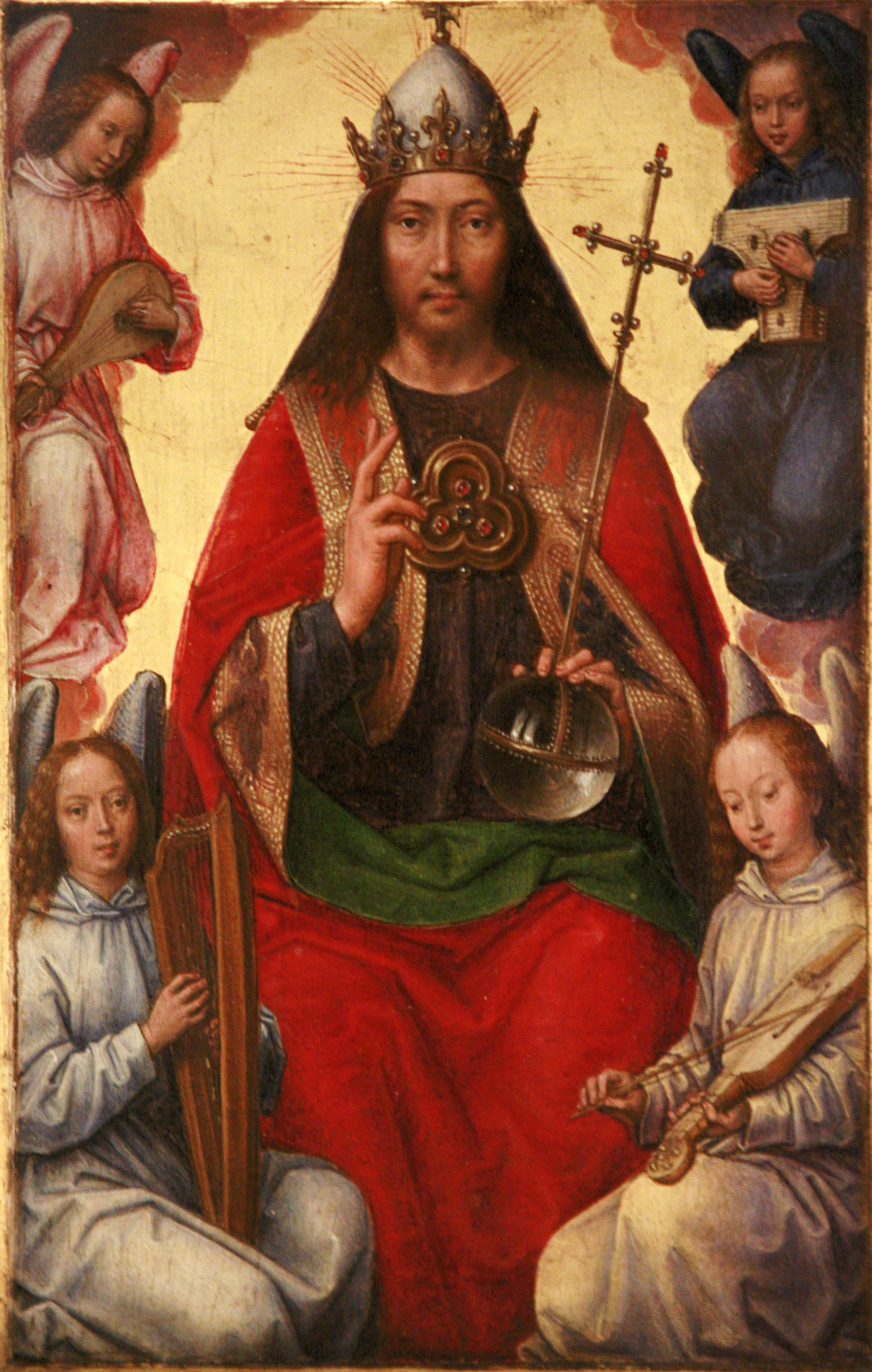
Hans Memling, Earthly Vanity and Divine Salvation, detail (c. 1485). Musée des Beaux-Arts de Strasbourg (also bearing attributes of a Christ in Majesty, such as the crown)

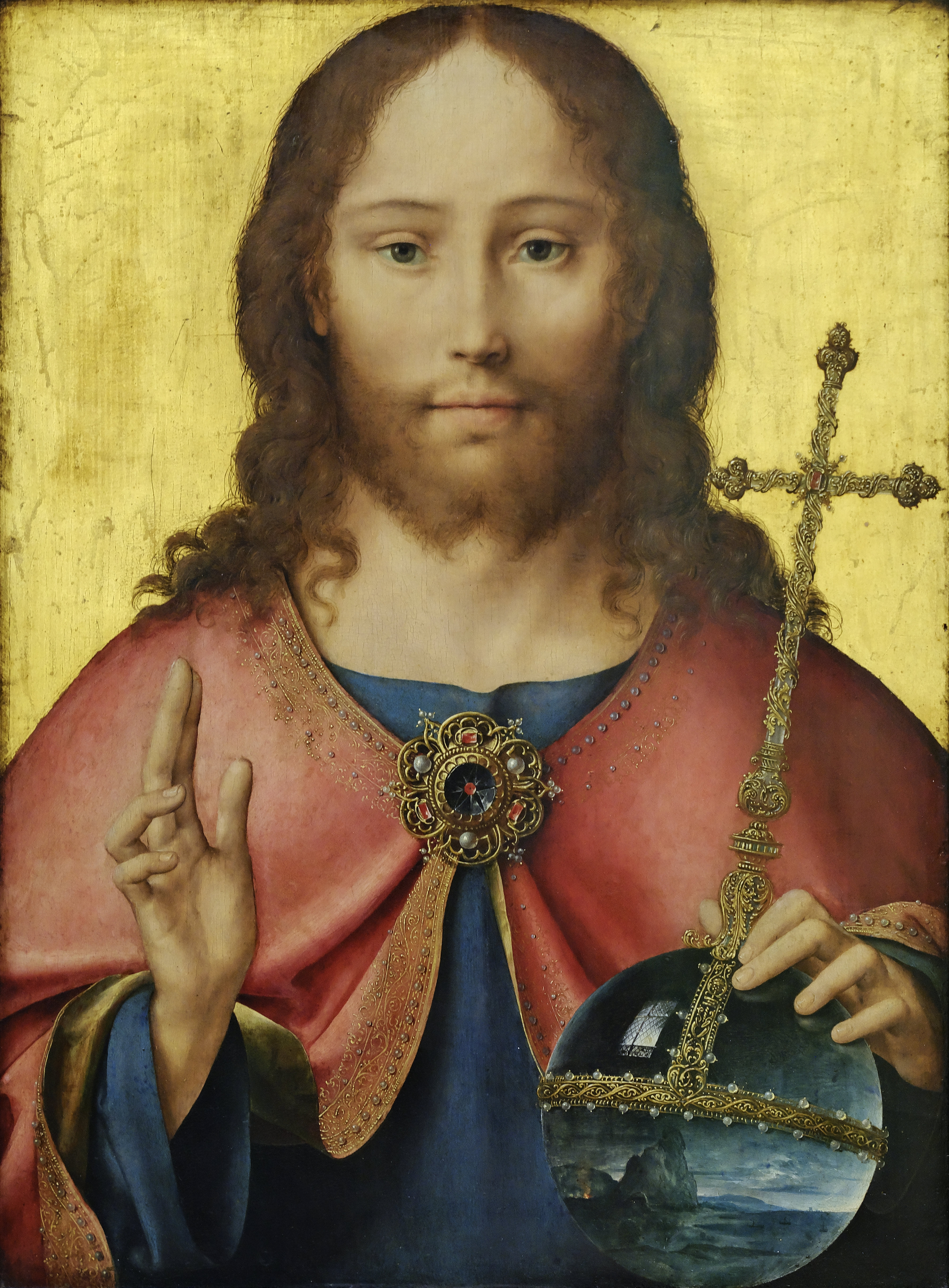
Joos van Cleve, Christ as Salvator Mundi (c. 1516–1518), Louvre

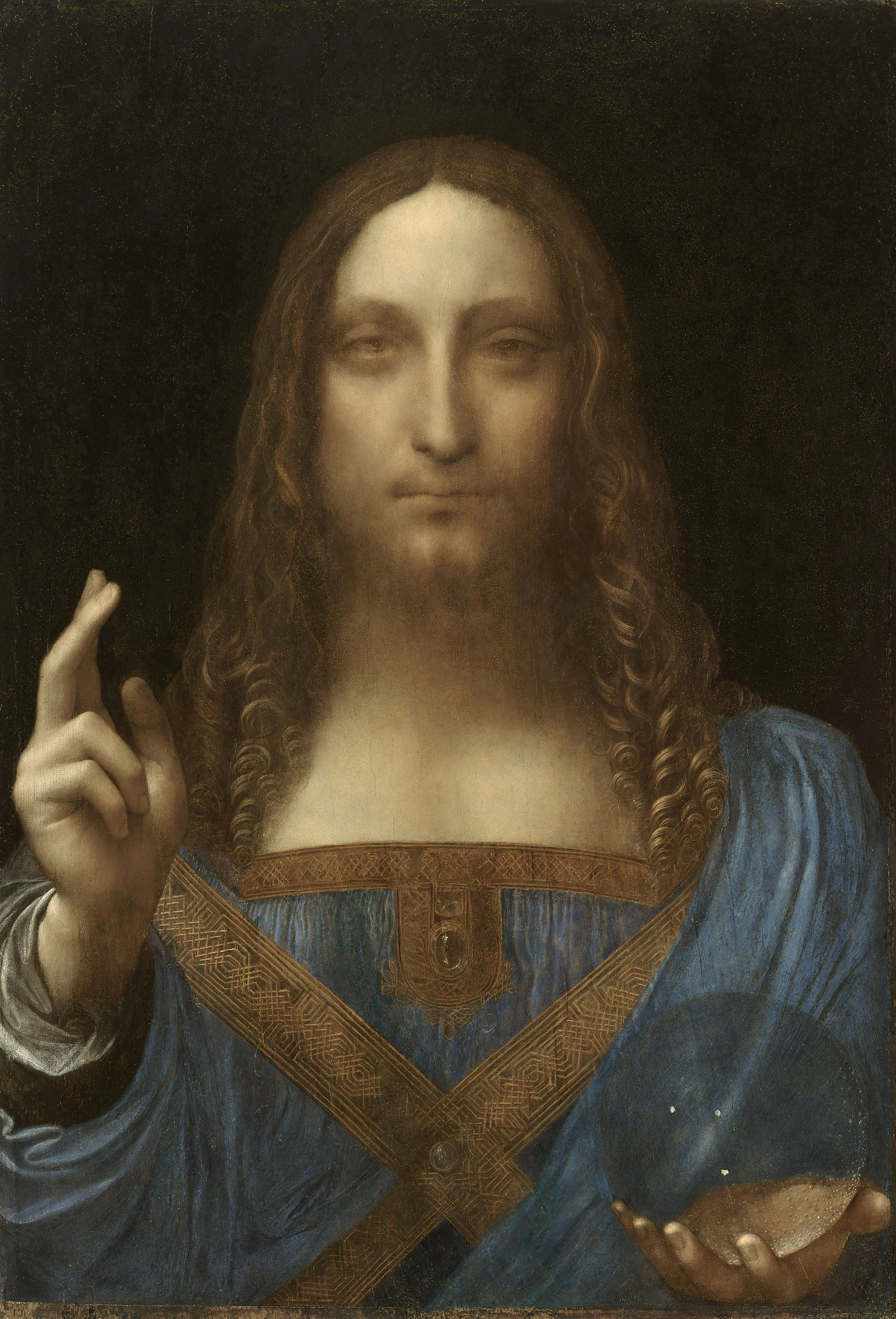
Leonardo da Vinci (attributed), Salvator Mundi (c. 1499–1510), currently owned by Mohammad bin Salman

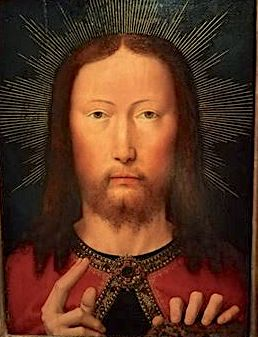
Gerard David, Salvator Mundi (c. 1500), Philadelphia Museum of Art

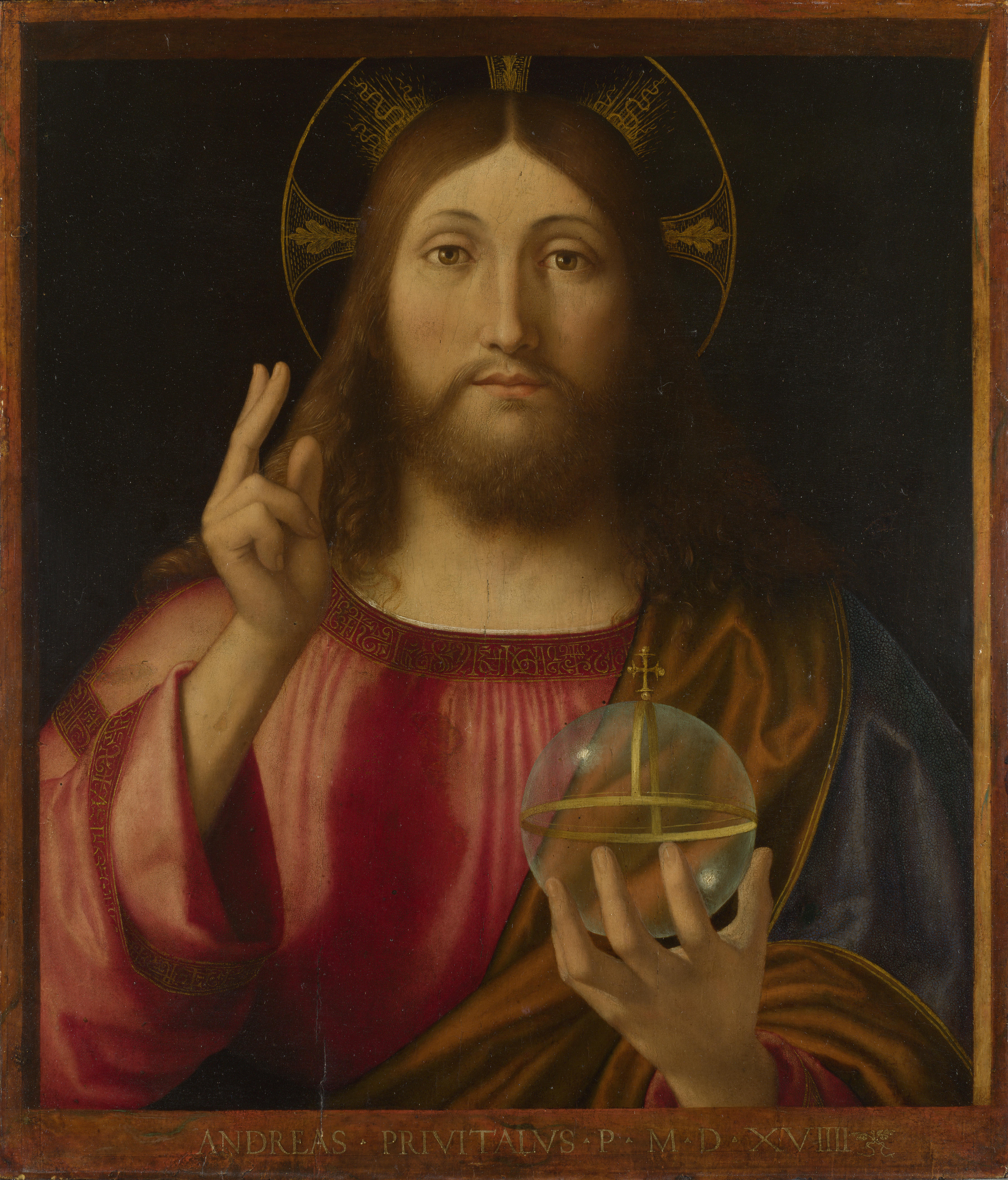
Andrea Previtali, Salvator Mundi (1519), National Gallery

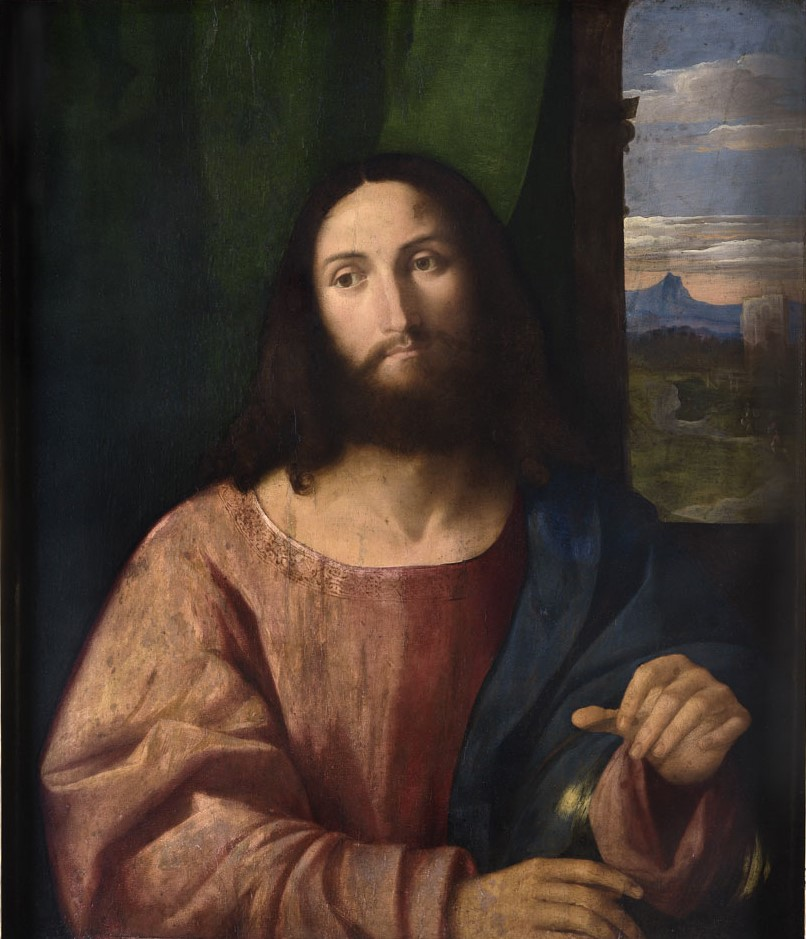
Palma Vecchio, Salvator Mundi (c. 1520), Musée des Beaux-Arts de Strasbourg (depicted without the blessing hand)

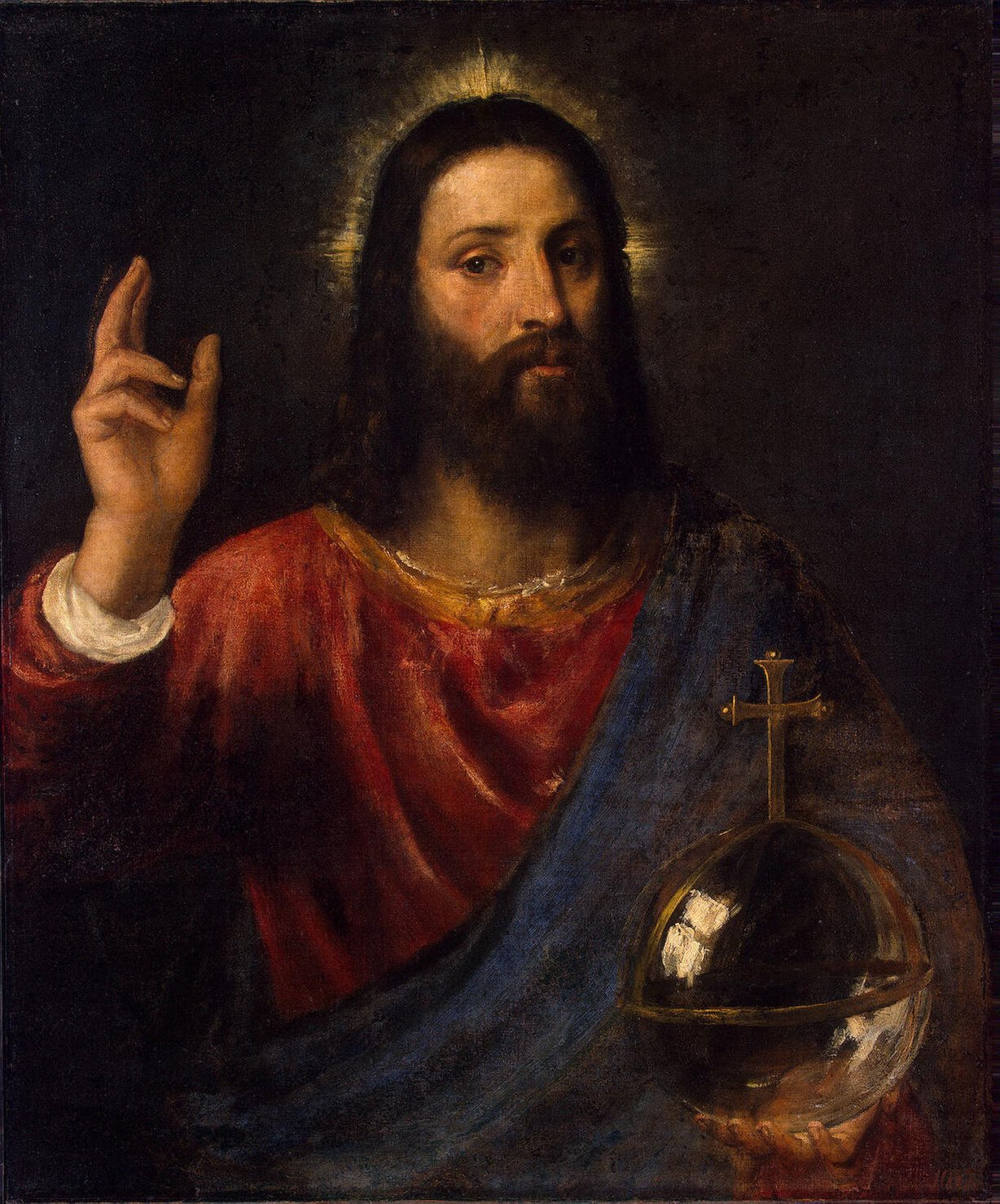
Titian, Salvator Mundi (c. 1570), Hermitage Museum

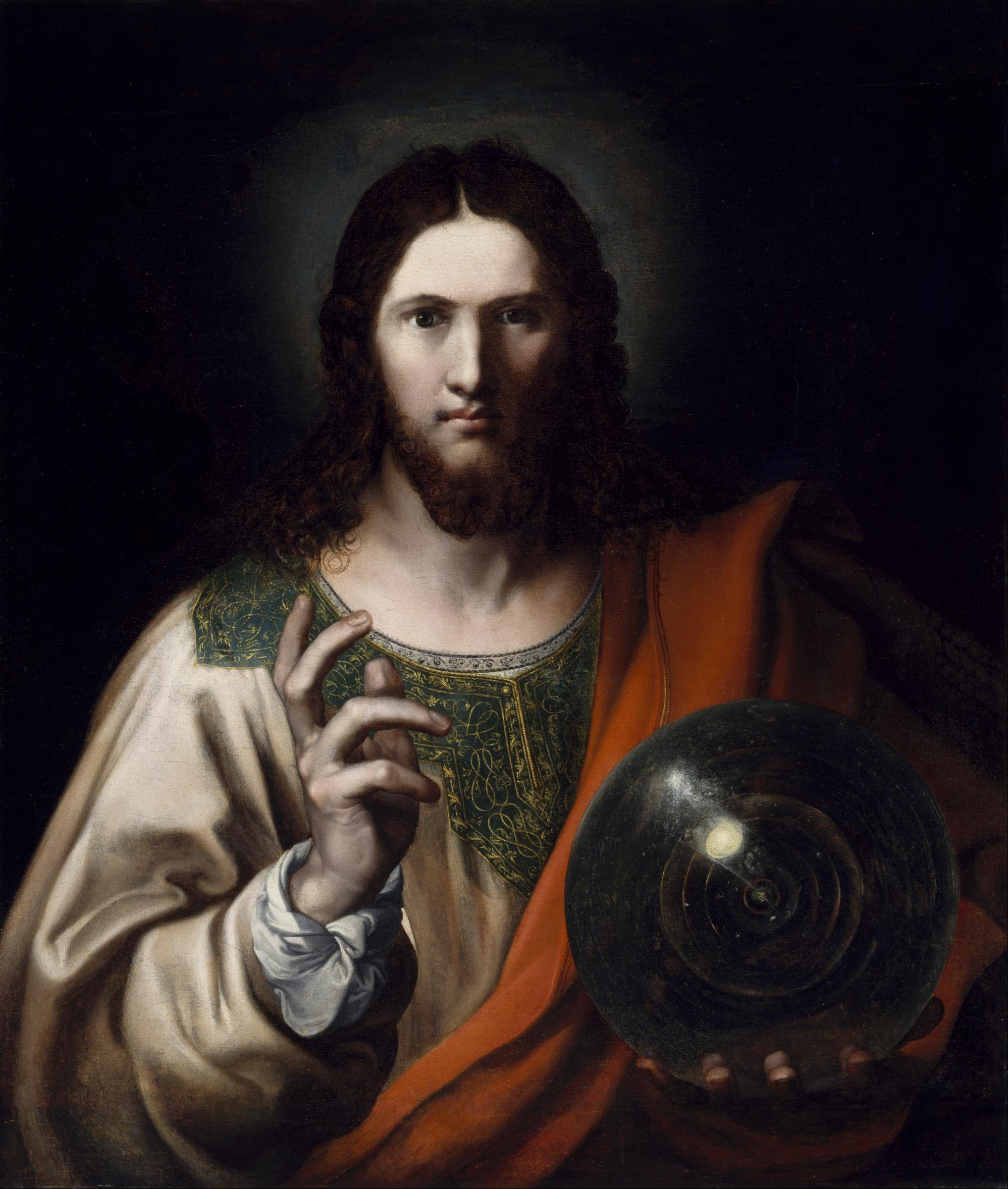
Unknown Flemish artist, Salvator Mundi (third quarter of 16th century)

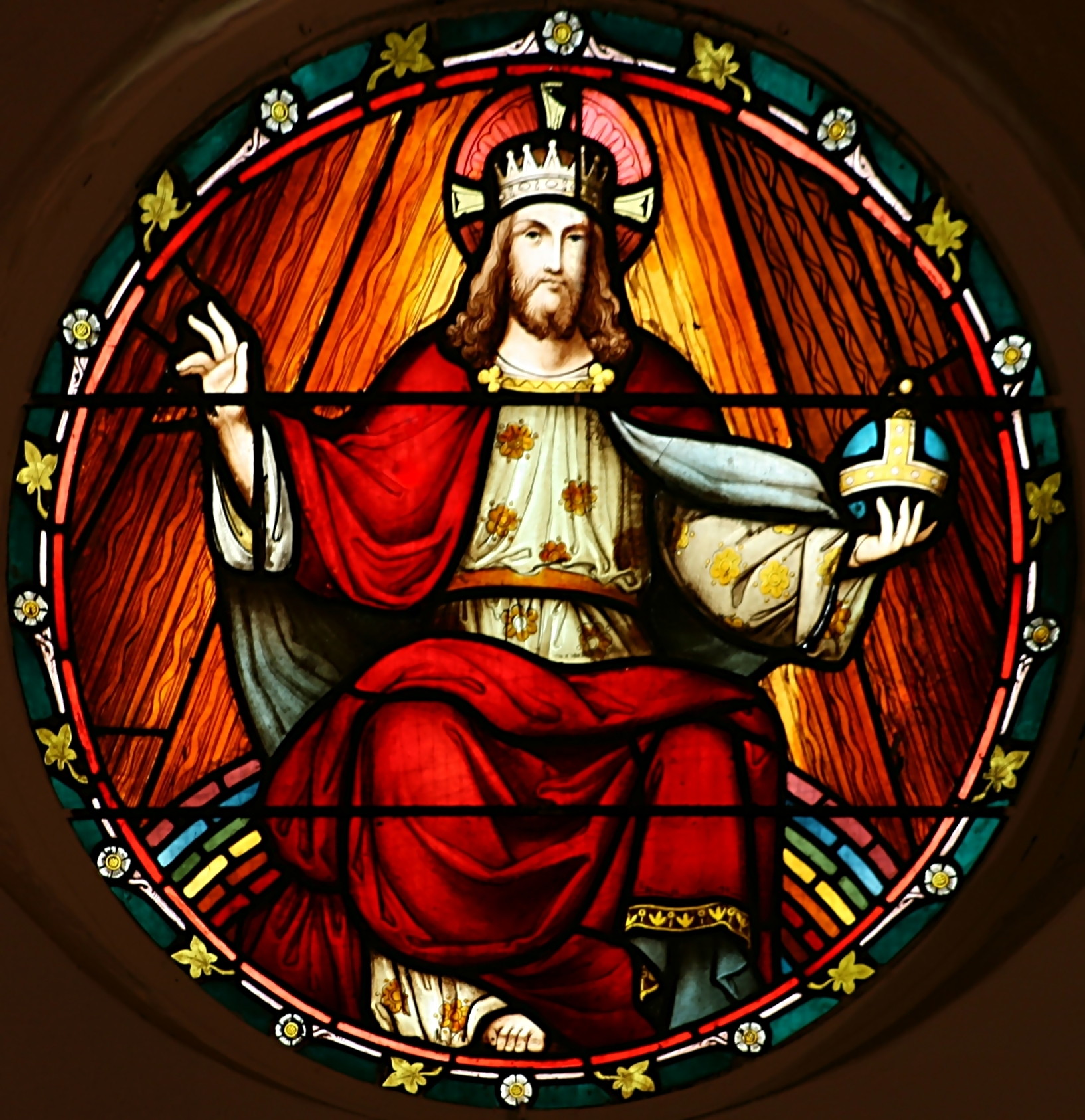
Stained glass panel in the transept of St. John's Anglican Church, Ashfield, New South Wales

== See also ==
- Christ Pantocrator
- "He's Got the Whole World in His Hands" (song)
