= St Martin's Church, Næstved =

St Martin's Church, Næstved Sankt Mortens Kirke
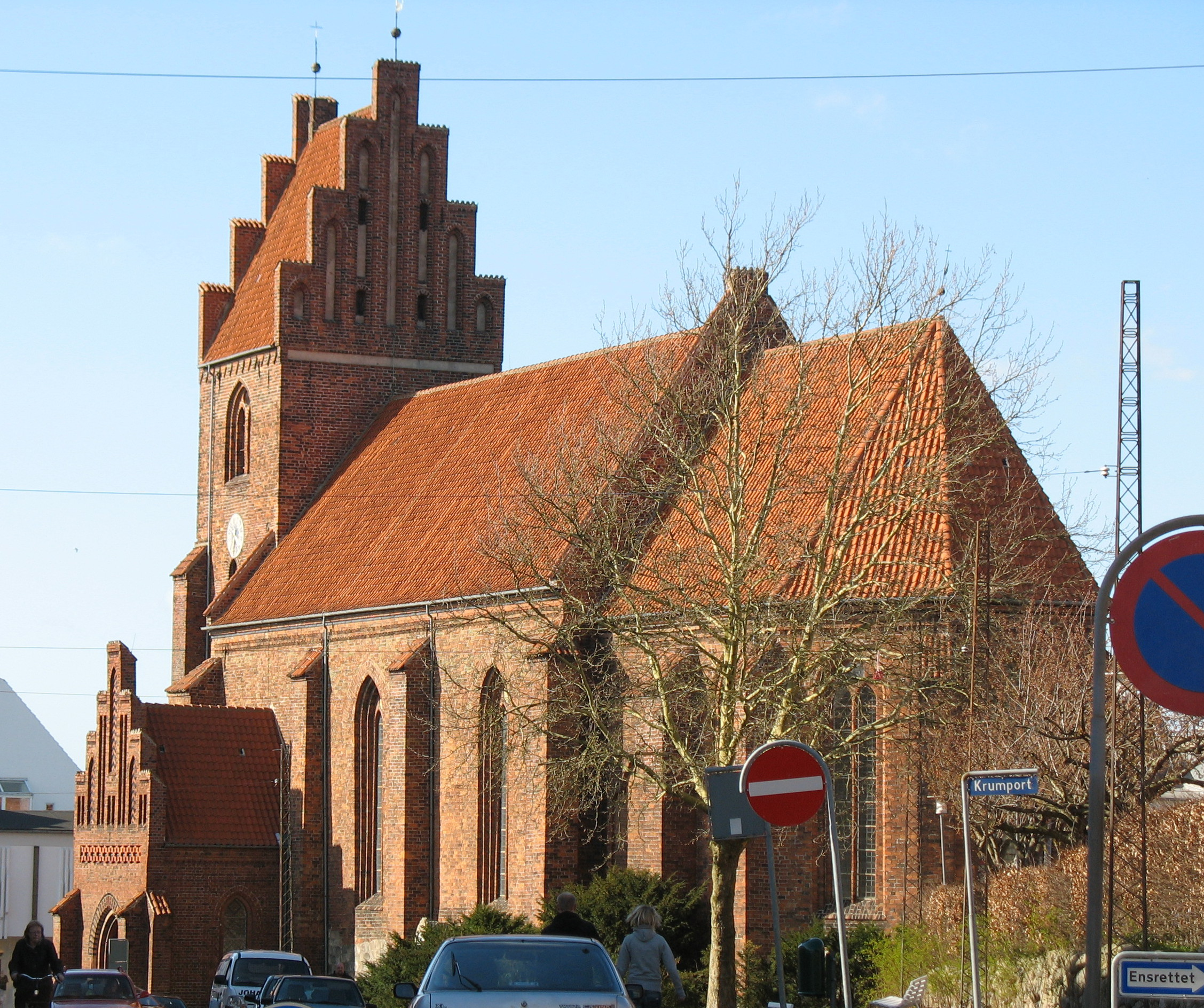
- St Martin's Church, Næstved
- St Martin's Church, Næstved; Sankt Mortens Kirke
- 55°13′47″N 11°45′39″E
- Location: Næstved
- Country: Denmark
- Denomination: Church of Denmark
- Previous denomination: Catholic

History
- Founded: c. 1200
- Dedication: St. Martin of Tours

Architecture
- Functional status: Functional
- Style: Early Gothic; Late Gothic; Baroque

St Martin's Church (Danish: Sankt Mortens Kirke) is located in Næstved on the Danish island of Sealand. It is one of the city's medieval churches. Known from records since approximately 1280, it is believed to have been built and put into service around 1200. The building was constructed as the city's parish church. It is dedicated to St Martin of Tours considered its patron saint. It is one of the five Church of Denmark churches in Næstved; the other four are the St Peter's Church, St John's Church, Herlufsholm Church and Holsted Church. St Martin's Church and St Peter's Church are located on perpendicular streets, the former situated on Riddergade, while the latter is on Købmagergade.

== History ==
The church is a Gothic structure built with bricks. The oldest parts of the church are from the 1220s. The tower was added in the 15th century but the baptismal chapel and the porch were completed as late as the 1850s.

== Furnishings ==
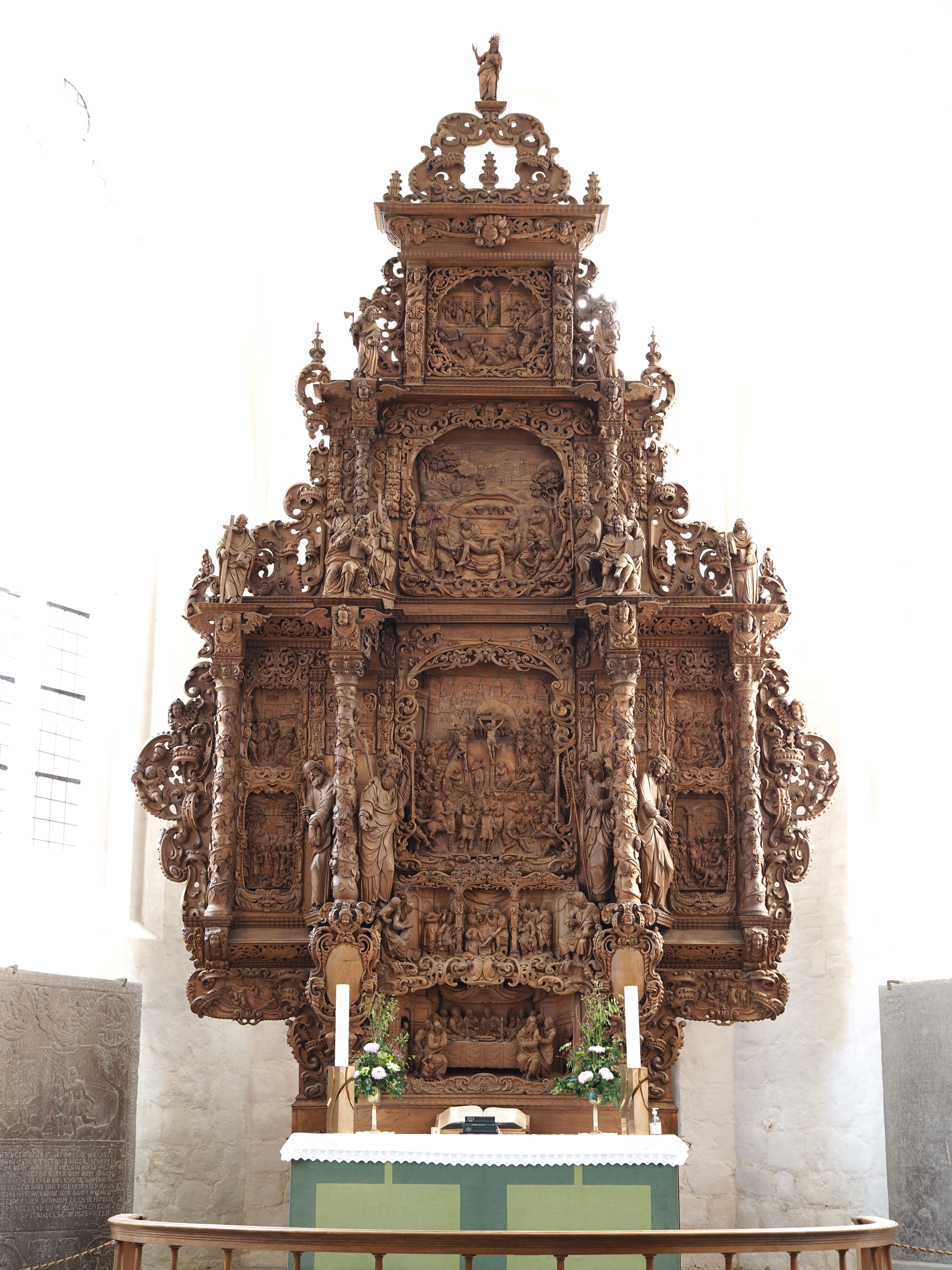
altar

The arches bear a portrait of St Martin. There are many frescoes of the period; one depicts him as a soldier sitting on his horse, while he cuts a piece of his officer cap and gives it to a beggar. The church's first organ, installed in 1587, was made by Hans Brebus (d. 1603), a Flemish organ builder who practiced in Denmark and Sweden. The altarpiece (1667) of 6 m (20 ft) height is decorated with figures wearing grotesque masks or with mustaches, some of whom are stooping low) and is attributed to the woodcarver Abel Schrøder (1602–1676) who was also the church's organist for forty-two years. Today's Frobenius organ dates to 1975. The pulpit was built by Abel Schrøder's father.
