= 1548 in literature =

This article contains information about the literary events and publications of 1548.

== Events ==
- unknown dates
  - Hôtel de Bourgogne opens as a theatre in Paris.
  - Roger Ascham becomes tutor to Princess Elizabeth, the future Queen Elizabeth I of England.

== New books ==
=== Prose ===
- Mikael Agricola – Se Wsi Testamenti (first translation of New Testament into Finnish)
- Edward Hall (posthumously) – The Union of the Two Noble and Illustre Families of Lancastre and Yorke (commonly called Hall's Chronicle)
- Gruffudd Hiraethog – Oll synnwyr pen Kembero ygyd (posthumous collection of Welsh proverbs by William Salesbury)
- Martynas Mažvydas – The Simple Words of Catechism (first printed book in Lithuanian)
- Catherine Parr – The Lamentation of a Sinner
- Paolo Pino – Dialogo di pittura
- William Salesbury – A Dictionary in Englyshe and Welshe
- Nicholas Udall – The first tome or volume of the Paraphrase of Erasmus vpon the newe testamente
- Thomas Vicary – Anatomie of the bodie of man
- Gioanventura Rosetti – Plictho of Gioanventura Rosetti

=== Drama ===
- John Bale – Kynge Johan

=== Poetry ===
- See 1548 in poetry

== Births ==
- May – Carel van Mander, Dutch painter and poet (died 1606)
- July 8 – Kim Jang-saeng, Korean scholar, politician and writer (died 1631)
- September 2 – Vincenzo Scamozzi, Italian writer on architecture (died 1616)
- November – André Guijon, French orator (died 1631)
- November 27 – Jacopo Mazzoni, Italian philosopher (died 1598)
- Unknown date – Luis Barahona de Soto, Spanish poet (died 1595)

== Deaths ==
- February 26 – Lorenzino de' Medici, Italian writer, 33
- June 6 – João de Castro, Portuguese explorer and writer, 48
- October 27 – Johannes Dantiscus, Polish poet and bishop, 63
- Unknown date – Cristoforo di Messisbugo, Italian food writer
