= List of chancellors of the University of Cambridge =

The chancellor of the University of Cambridge is the ceremonial head of the university. The position dates from the 13th century. Chancellors were elected annually until 1514, and thereafter were elected for life.

Tenure	Chancellor	Notes
c.1215–c.1232	Richard of Wetheringsett	
c.1246	Hugh de Hotton	
1256	Reginald Gerninghall	
1257	Stephen Hepworth	
1259	William de Ludham	
1260	Richard de Gedney	
1261	Richard Dryfield	
1267	John de Asgarby	
1270–1275	John Hooke	
1276	Roger de Fulbourn	
1283	Andrew de Gisleham	
1286	Thomas Sheringham	
1287	Stephen Hepworth	
1289–1290	Ralph de Leicester	
1290–1292	Geoffery de Pakenham	
1293–1295	Henry de Boyton	
1295–1296	John de Bradenham	
1296–1299	Thomas de Sheringham	
1299	Stephen Hepworth	
1300–1303	Stephen Haslingfield	
1303–1307	Stephen de Segrace	
1307	Stephen Haslingfield	
1315	Richard de Ashton	
1321–1326		Roger Northburgh has been incorrectly described as Chancellor in sources since as early as 1691.
1326–1329	Richard de Badew	
1329–1331	Thomas de Foxton	
c. 1330	Robert de Winwick	
1331–1334	John de Langley	
1334–1335	Robert de Mildenhall	
1335–1337	Henry de Herwarden	
1337–1339	Richard Harling (or Ling)	
1340	Robert de Claydon	
1341	Thomas de Northwood	
1344	Thomas de Northwood	
1346–1348	John de Crakhall	Re-elected in 1348 on 9 June
1348	Thomas de Grantchester	
1348	William de Lymbergh	Elected 15 December
1349–1351	Richard Leicester (or Richard de Wetherset, Hetherset, Wetheringsett)	Elected 21 Jan.
1351	Richard Harling	
1352	Anthony of Grantchester	
1352–1359	William Tynkell	
1359–1360	Thomas Sutton	
1360–1361	Richard de Wetherset	
1361–1362	Michael de Haynton	
1361–1366	Michael de Causton	
1366–1369	William de Gotham	
1369	Thomas de Stewkley	
1371	John de Donwich	
1373–1374	Adam de Lakenheath	
1374	John de Donwich	
1376	William de Gotham	
1378–1379	Richard Scrope	
1380	Eudo (or Guy) Zouche	
1380–1381	John Cavendish	
1382	Guy Zouche	
1382–1383	John de Bromyard	
1383	John of Neketon	
1384	John de Burgh (or Borough)	
1385	Thomas Hetherset (or de Hethersett)	
1386	John de Burgh (or Borough)	
1388	William Colvile	
1390–1391	Richard Dereham	
1391	William Colvile	
1392	John de Neketon	
1394	William Colvile	
1396	Guy Zouche	
1400–1402	Richard de Billingford	
1404–1408	Richard Dereham	
1409–1413	Richard de Billingford	
1414	Stephen le Scrope	
1415–1422	John de Rickingale	
1422–1423	Thomas de Cobham	
1424–1426	Robert Fitzhugh	
1426	William Wymbell	
1427	Marmaduke Lumley	
1429–1430	John Holeroke	
1431–1432	William Lascells	
1432	Richard de Billingford	
1433–1435	Richard Cawdray	
1436–1445	John Langton	
1445–1446	Nicholas Kenton	
1447	John Langton	
1448	Robert Ascogh	
1450–1451	Nicholas Close	
1451–1456	William Percy	
1456–1458	Lawrence Booth	
1458	William Wilflete (or Wolflet)	
1459–1460	Robert Woodlark	
1461	Richard Scroope	
1462–1463	Robert Woodlark	
1463–1464	John Booth	
1464	William Wilflete	
1465–1468	John Harrison (or Herrison)	
1466	William Wilflete	
1468–1469	Edward Story	
1469–1471	Thomas Rotherham (or Scot)	
1471–1472	Edward Story	
1473–1479	Thomas Rotherham	
1479–1483	John Boynton	
1483–1485	Thomas Rotherham	
1490	Thomas Cosyn	
1494–1496	John Blythe	
1496–1499	George Fitzhugh	
1499–1500	Thomas Rotherham	
1500	Richard Fox	
1502	George Fitzhugh	
1503	Thomas Ruthall (or Rowthall)	
1504–1535	John Fisher	Appointed for life in 1514
1535–1540	Thomas Cromwell, 1st Earl of Essex	
1540–1547	Stephen Gardiner	
1547–1552	Edward Seymour, 1st Duke of Somerset	
1552–1553	John Dudley, 1st Duke of Northumberland	
1553–1555	Stephen Gardiner	
1556–1558	Reginald Pole	
1559–1598	William Cecil, 1st Baron Burghley	
1598–1601	Robert Devereux, 2nd Earl of Essex	
1601–1612	Robert Cecil, 1st Earl of Salisbury	
1612–1614	Henry Howard, 1st Earl of Northampton	
1614–1626	Thomas Howard, 1st Earl of Suffolk	
1626–1628	George Villiers, 1st Duke of Buckingham	
1628–1649	Henry Rich, 1st Earl of Holland	A Royalist officer in the English Civil War from 1643, executed for treason in 1649
1649–1651	Edward Montagu, 2nd Earl of Manchester	
1651–1660	Oliver St John	
1660–1671	Edward Montagu, 2nd Earl of Manchester	Reinstated as Chancellor after the Restoration
1671–1674	George Villiers, 2nd Duke of Buckingham	
1674–1682	James Scott, 1st Duke of Monmouth	
1682–1688	Christopher Monck, 2nd Duke of Albemarle	
1689–1748	Charles Seymour, 6th Duke of Somerset	
1748–1768	Thomas Pelham-Holles, 1st Duke of Newcastle-upon-Tyne	
1768–1811	Augustus FitzRoy, 3rd Duke of Grafton	
1811–1834	Prince William Frederick, Duke of Gloucester and Edinburgh	
1834–1840	John Pratt, 1st Marquess Camden	
1840–1847	Hugh Percy, 3rd Duke of Northumberland	
1847–1861	Albert, Prince Consort	
1861–1891	William Cavendish, 7th Duke of Devonshire	
1892–1908	Spencer Cavendish, 8th Duke of Devonshire	
1908–1919	John Strutt, 3rd Baron Rayleigh	
1919–1930	Arthur Balfour, 1st Earl of Balfour	
1930–1947	Stanley Baldwin, 1st Earl Baldwin of Bewdley	
1948–1950	Jan Smuts	
1950–1967	Arthur Tedder, 1st Baron Tedder	
1967–1976	Edgar Adrian, 1st Baron Adrian	
1976–2011	Prince Philip, Duke of Edinburgh	
2011–2025	David Sainsbury, Baron Sainsbury of Turville	
2025–	Chris Smith, Baron Smith of Finsbury	

== See also ==
- List of vice-chancellors of the University of Cambridge
- List of chancellors of the University of Oxford
