= 2011 University of Cambridge Chancellor election =

2011 election of ceremonial head of British university

2011 Cambridge chancellery election
- 14–15 October 2011
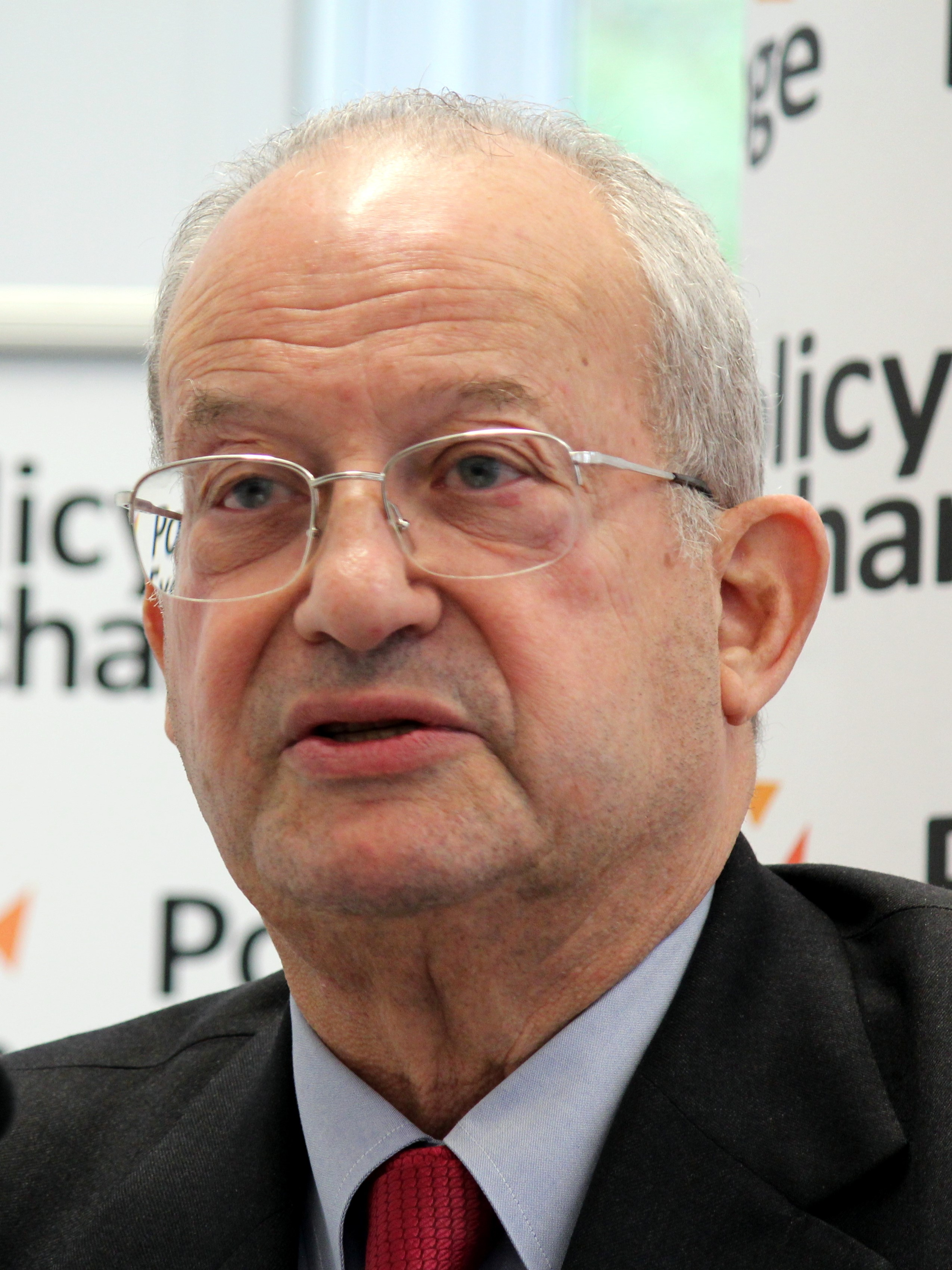

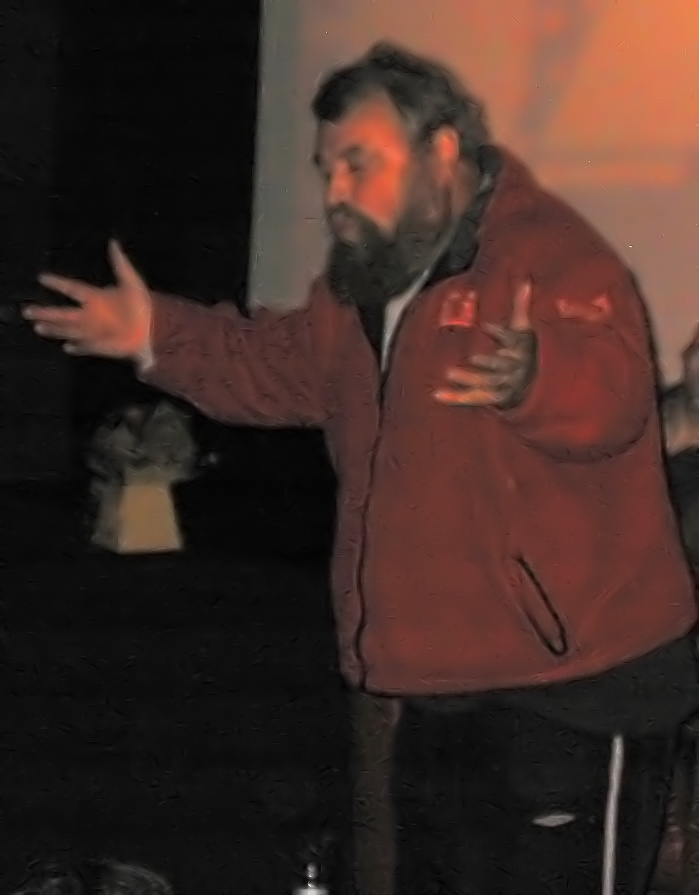

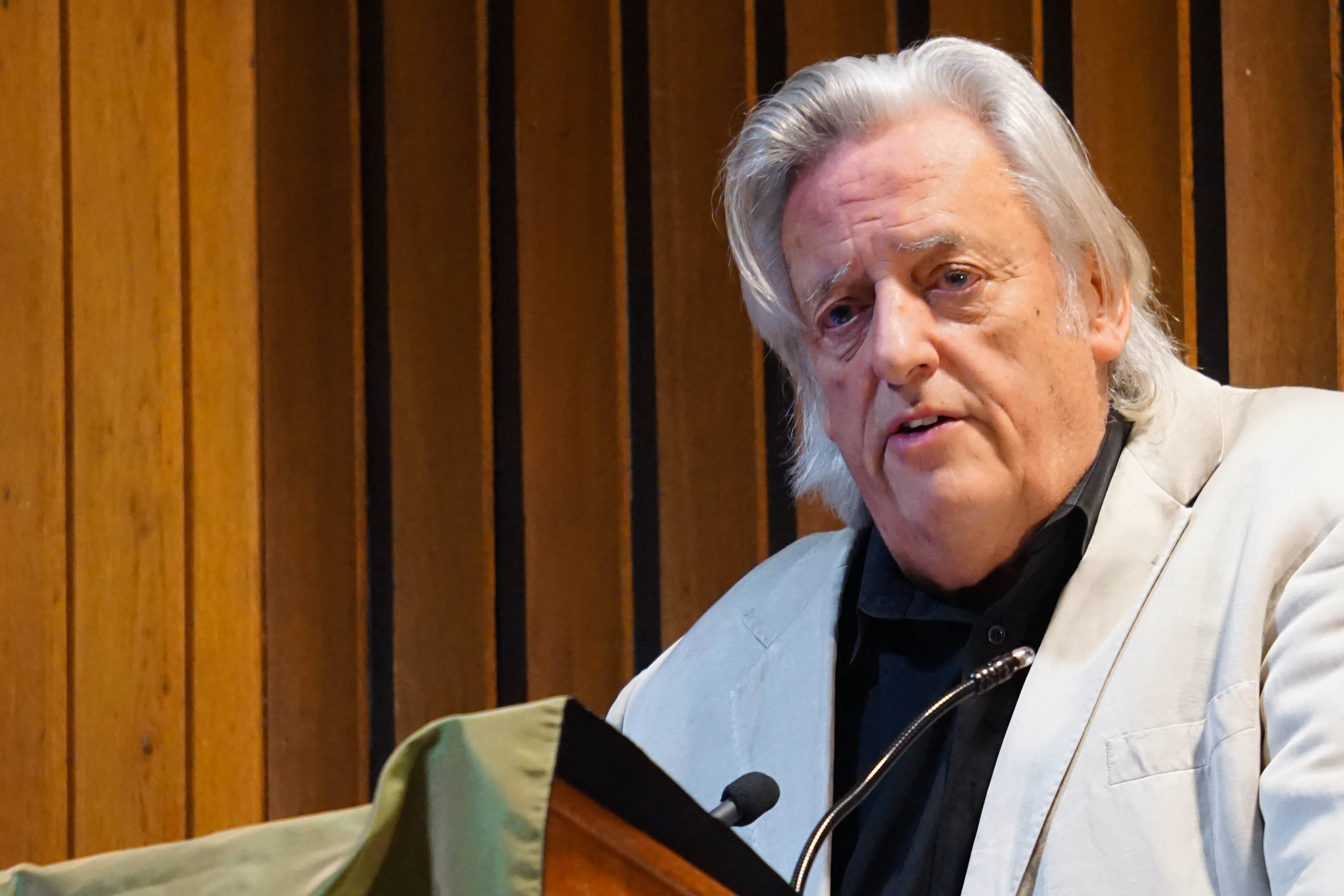
Candidate	The Lord Sainsbury of Turville	Brian Blessed
Party	Labour	Independent
Popular vote	2,893	1,389
Percentage	52.1%	25.0%
Candidate	Michael Mansfield	Abdul Arain
Party	Independent	Independent
Popular vote	964	312
Percentage	17.3%	5.6%
Chancellor before election
The Duke of Edinburgh
Elected Chancellor
The Lord Sainsbury of Turville

A rare contested election for the position of chancellor of the University of Cambridge occurred in October 2011, following the retirement of the previous chancellor, Prince Philip, Duke of Edinburgh. Four candidates contested the election: David Sainsbury, Baron Sainsbury of Turville, who was nominated by the university's Nomination Board and won with 52% of the vote; actor Brian Blessed, who finished second with 25% of the votes cast; barrister Michael Mansfield QC with 17%; and local grocery-owner Abdul Arain with 6%. Although the election was conducted under a single transferable vote, no transfers of votes were needed as Sainsbury secured a majority of first preference votes.

== Background ==
Prince Philip, consort of Queen Elizabeth II, had been chancellor since December 1976. He announced his retirement in 2010, following over three decades in the post, and formally stepped down at the end of June 2011. Philip was quoted by The New York Times as saying that "he wanted a life with 'less frantic rushing about' to ceremonial occasions and 'less trying to think of something to say.'"

== Electorate and voting ==
The electorate consisted of the Senate: all members of the University holding a higher degree from Cambridge. In effect, this meant that every Cambridge graduate holding a degree other than a bachelor's degree, barring the BD, was able to vote. Cambridge offers an upgrade of a BA to an MA six years and one term after undergraduates matriculate, so usually around three and a half years after they first graduate. Additionally, MA degrees are given to some members of staff, to make them a senior member of the university. In addition, all members of the Regent House were also entitled to vote as they are automatically members of the Senate, even if they have no previous Cambridge degree; this included most post-doctoral research staff who were also members of a faculty and also fellows of the colleges who do not hold a Cambridge degree.

Although not required to wear full academic dress to vote, voters were required to wear the appropriate gown and the university provided gowns free of charge to voters who did not have them. By contrast, the University of Oxford dispensed entirely with such dress requirements for its chancellor election in 2003.

The election was the first for a Cambridge chancellor to use the single transferable vote system.

According to the regulations, one of the candidates is nominated by the university's Nomination Board, and anyone else (whether a member of the University or not) can stand as a candidate if nominated by at least fifty senior members of the University holding higher degrees. Beyond the fifty or more nominators, there are no other requirements for candidates.

In the event of a contested election, a ballot must take place over two days, between 21 and 28 days of full term after the close of nominations. Since the date of the close of nominations (17 June 2011) fell on the last full day of Easter Term, this meant that an election could not be held until a month after the end of the summer vacation, in October 2011.

On 18 June, the university authorities set the polling days for Friday 14 October and Saturday 15 October 2011. Votes were cast in person at the Senate House in Cambridge between 10 am and 8 pm on each day.

== Candidates and campaign ==
In December 2010, aware that Prince Philip intended to retire at the end of that academic year, the university convened a Nomination Board, composed of the University Council, plus sixteen members appointed by the University Senate. On 20 May 2011, the Nomination Board put forward Sainsbury as their candidate. As per statutory procedure, if nobody had challenged him, he would then have been deemed elected unopposed on 1 July 2011, without the need for a ballot.

On 27 May, local grocery-owner Abdul Arain announced that he was standing against Sainsbury, in opposition to an application to build a Sainsbury's Local in Cambridge's Mill Road district, which he claimed would harm the character of the area. He argued that, "once again, the university is called upon to be the vanguard of local communities", later adding, "Cambridge should be an institution that nurtures the community as well as world-renowned educational values", and that, "I'm standing for the whole Cambridge community." Speaking to The Grocer, Arain commented, "I’m not against Lord Sainsbury personally but the university should defend the local community. Cambridge is becoming a clone town." He also compared his "outsider" status to that of Barack Obama. Despite Arain's early declaration to stand, it took him a while to accumulate the 50 nominations necessary, stating on 3 June that he had 40 signatures, and expected to have another 10 by the close of nominations. On 6 June, he confirmed that he now had 50 nominators.

Prior to Arain's campaign announcement, it was generally assumed that Lord Sainsbury's candidature would be unopposed, and an initial press announcement from the university seemed to confirm that preparations were underway to install Sainsbury unopposed. No election has been opposed since 1950, where one candidate withdrew before the poll; the last election actively contested at a poll was in 1847.

On 31 May, it was announced that over the preceding Bank Holiday weekend, a Facebook campaign by Cambridge graduates to draft veteran Shakespearean actor Brian Blessed as a candidate had resulted in the necessary 50 signatures being generated. Blessed was then approached, and released a statement on 2 June that he was "absolutely staggered" by the nomination, but that he was "delighted to accept", stating in his acceptance letter, "For me, Cambridge has always been the centre of the earth, there is a brightness and light there that rivals that on Mount Everest. The University buildings are architecturally beautiful, the whole setting is wonderful and enchants the soul. I am thrilled to be asked and wish you every success with the campaign." Blessed later added, "To me, being the next Chancellor of Cambridge University would be a miracle, because I’m the son of a coal miner", and he pledged to be an active Chancellor, remarking, "I’d like to inspire them to do expeditions all over the world. I would love to join them in expeditions, and promote adventure, adventure, adventure: I think the key to the new millennium is adventure. And it is that that I want to urge; and the university has so many projects, so many enterprises, so many departments, it makes my hair stand on end at the prospect of working with them." A poll in The Tab amongst their student readers (few of whom could vote) found Blessed to be the overwhelming favourite amongst students, polling 63.2%, compared to 13.5% for none of the candidates, 10% for Abdul Arain, and 5.7% for Lord Sainsbury, with 7.7% voting "I don't care."

On 2 June, Cambridge Classics Professor and Times columnist Mary Beard noted that despite "no connection" over Sainsbury's £82 million in donations to Cambridge University, she would "probably" vote for him, branding Arain a "publicity seeker", and describing Blessed's popularity with younger voters and students as "puzzling."

On 6 June, The Independent commented that the election had been expected to be a "David and Goliath battle between Lord Sainsbury and local shopkeeper Abdul Arain. But this unlikely face-off could be disrupted by the unexpected participation" of Blessed.

On 14 June, it was reported that radical socialist barrister Michael Mansfield had been nominated by several Cambridge academics, with the lawyer describing his candidature as, "a fine opportunity to defend the principles of Higher Education and critical thinking in particular, which have been steadily eroded by successive governments wedded to market forces." In their supporting letter, his nominators contrasted his stance on several issues with that of Lord Sainsbury, writing that, "even if Mr Mansfield does not win this election, the campaign in his support will be able to articulate very clearly the fundamental opposition between what these two men stand for." One of Mansfield's nominators elaborated to the Law Gazette on why the barrister was standing: "Is it too rude to call (Lord Sainsbury) a plutocrat? He has inherited wealth, and represents some of the capitalist focus that threatens the ideas on which a university is founded. We’d like to see someone who is prepared to question the establishment."

Nominations closed on 17 June, when a university spokesman confirmed that all four candidates had secured the level of support needed to get on to the ballot paper. Lord Sainsbury made his first public statement on the election since being nominated, stating, "I have great admiration and affection for the university, built up over all the years since I was an undergraduate at King's, studying history and then psychology. I also have a life-long interest in education. I have no personal agenda, and if elected, my sole aim would be to help the university in any way that I can."

BBC Breakfast News profiled the election on 5 July, identifying Brian Blessed as "the runaway favourite" for the post.

On 24 July, Brian Blessed launched his official campaign website.

On 22 August, Blessed drew press attention as he released his first campaign video, in which Blessed described his humble origins and argued that the next Chancellor "must sweat blood to help people who are underprivileged", and offered to help in widening access to Cambridge, "with humour, and drive and soul and appreciation."

On 14 September, the Cambridge Union Society announced that they had secured the agreement of all four candidates for each to give their own separate hustings in the week before the election, with four Q&A sessions scheduled for between 10 and 12 October. None of the candidates would be attending hustings opposite their rival candidates.

On 20 September, Lord Sainsbury launched his official campaign website.

On 23 September, it was announced in the local press that Blessed intended to spend the afternoon of one of the election days holding court in a Cambridge pub, thanking his supporters as they return from voting. Blessed subsequently received endorsements from Cambridge alumni Stephen Fry and Sir Derek Jacobi.

On 3 October, Lord Sainsbury gave an election interview with the Cambridge Evening News, in which he said "I’m not quite certain why any of the other three" candidates were standing against him, and he described his links to Cambridge as an undergraduate at King's between 1959 and 1963, his strong record in promoting British universities as a government minister, and his support for the introduction of student fees in the 1990s.

On 6 October, Abdul Arain revealed that he had the backing of the Cambridge's Mill Road Society, of which he is a former Chairman. He also unveiled several posters of himself, some YouTube videos in which he set out his case for standing, based on "representing a world-class university which has deep roots in its local community." Subsequently, Cambridge Student paper The Tab commented, "This leaves radical lawyer Michael Mansfield the quietest contender so far", with Mansfield having made no public statement on the election since his letter accepting nomination four months earlier.

On 7 October, IT analysts speculated "a failure by Cambridge University administrators to understand online campaign techniques may result in the defeat of their preferred candidate for the next university chancellor - Lord Sainsbury of Turville", and predicted a possible victory for Blessed. Cambridge alumnus Anthony Zacharzewski, a democracy analyst and founder of the Democratic Society, argued that the University's failure to engage with online campaigning and to adequately publicise the candidates' web presences, "plays into the hands of the Blessed vote", since his supporters had the best-organised online presence. The same analysts also predicted "gridlock in the city centre" on the election days. Neither prediction was borne out by events.

== Results ==
The results were announced just after mid-day on Sunday 16 October.

Lord Sainsbury of Turville, K	2,893	52.1
Mr Brian Blessed	1,389	25.0
Michael Mansfield QC	964	17.3
Mr Abdul Arain	312	5.6

Analysis of the election noted low turnout, with 2.5% of those eligible casting votes.

On hearing of his success, Lord Sainsbury said:

I am delighted and honoured to have been elected as the next Chancellor of Cambridge University, and would like to thank all those who have supported me, and the other candidates who have made this such a friendly election. I am particularly pleased that the election did not turn into a battle between the arts and humanities and science, or between political parties, and I look forward to championing the University in its entirety at home and abroad in the years ahead.

== See also ==
- 2025 University of Cambridge Chancellor election
- List of chancellors of the University of Cambridge
