= 2025 University of Cambridge Chancellor election =

2025 election of ceremonial head of British university

2025 Cambridge chancellery election
- 9–18 July 2025
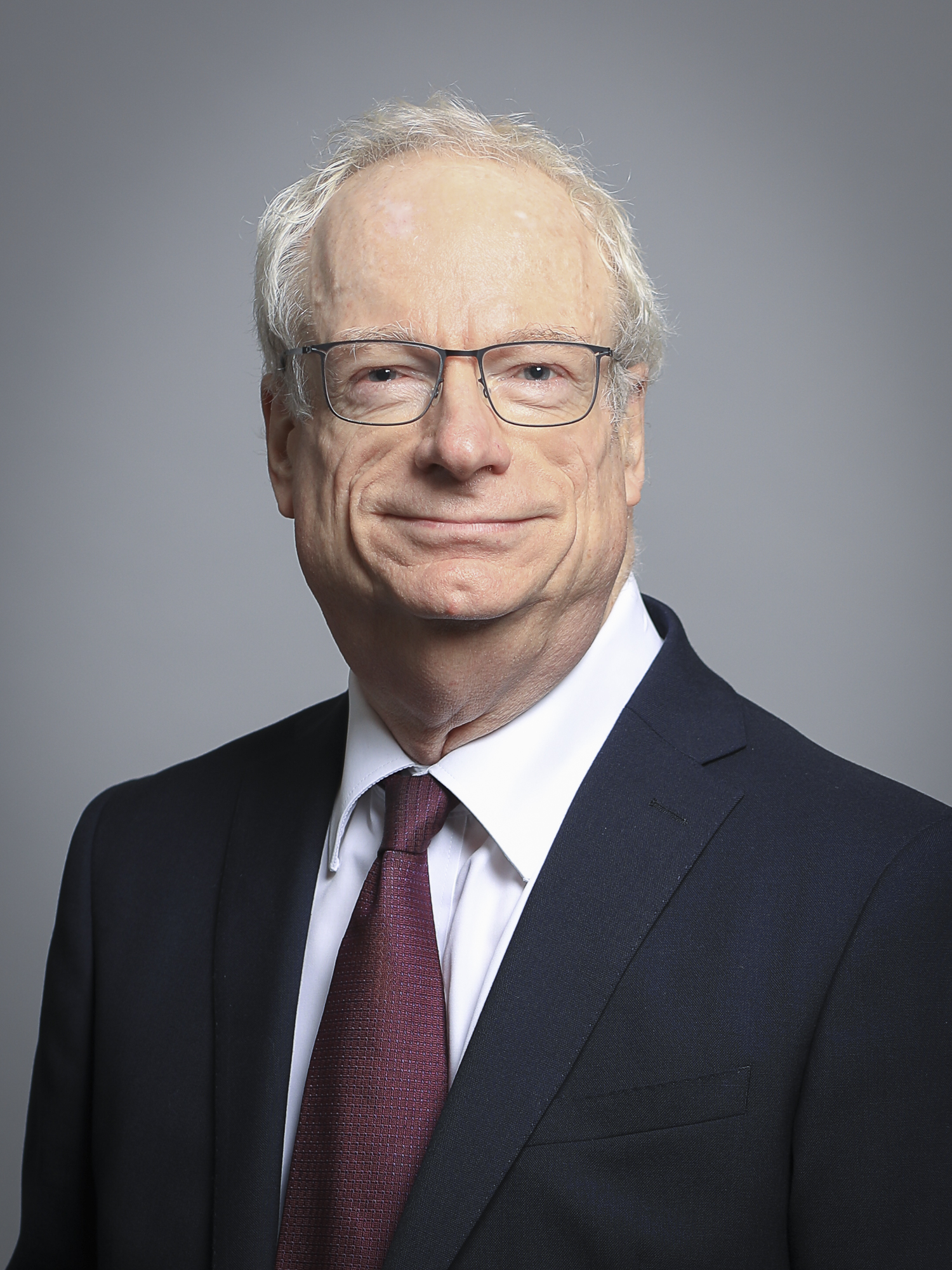

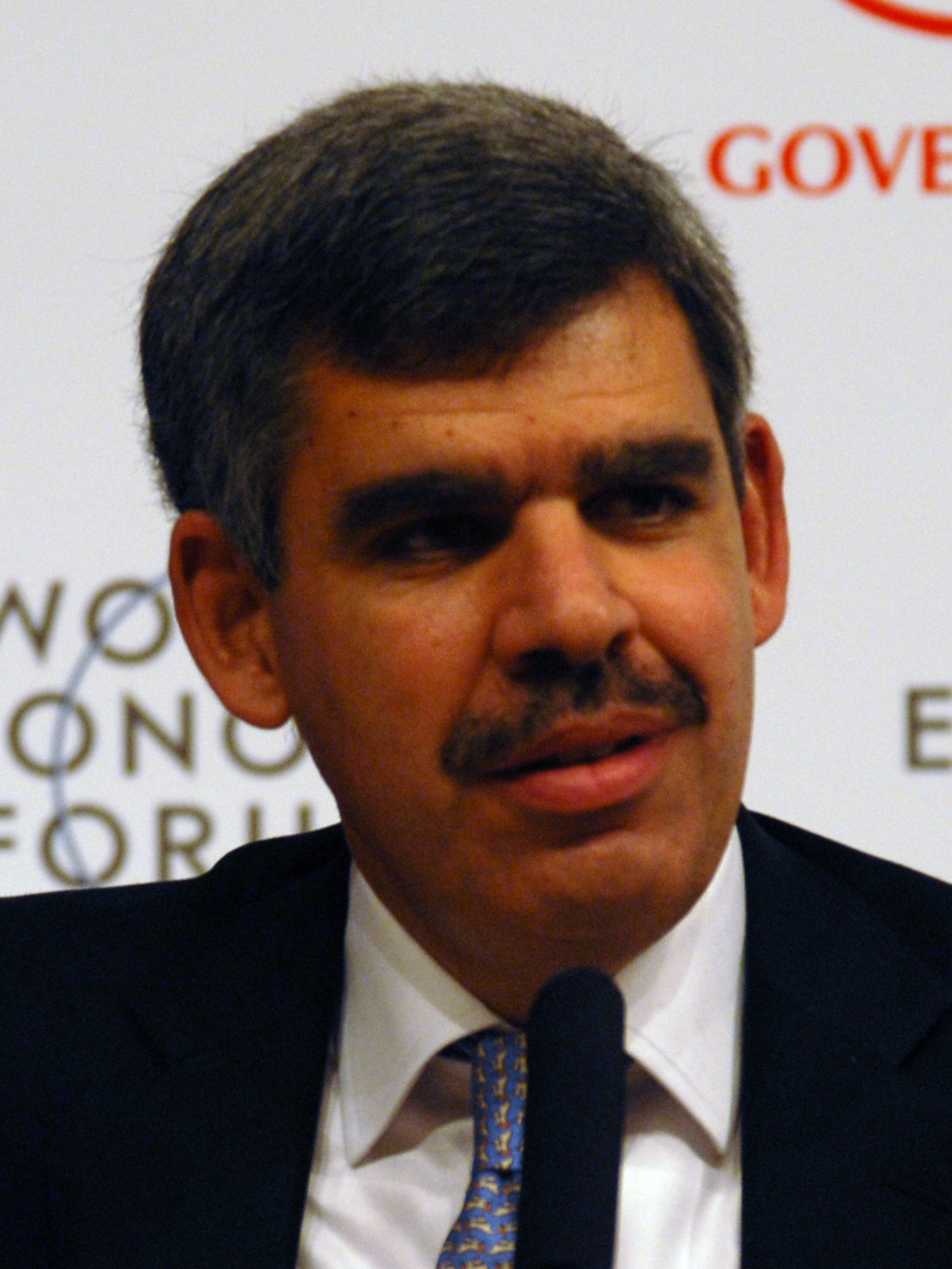

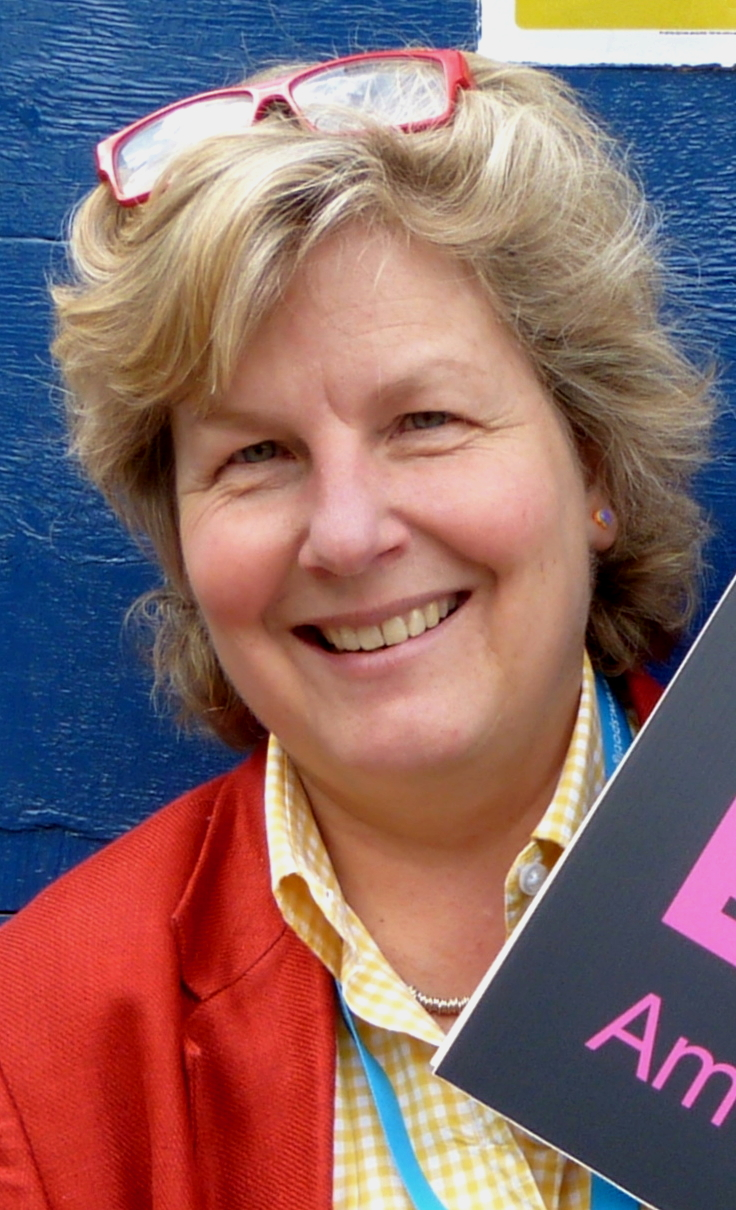

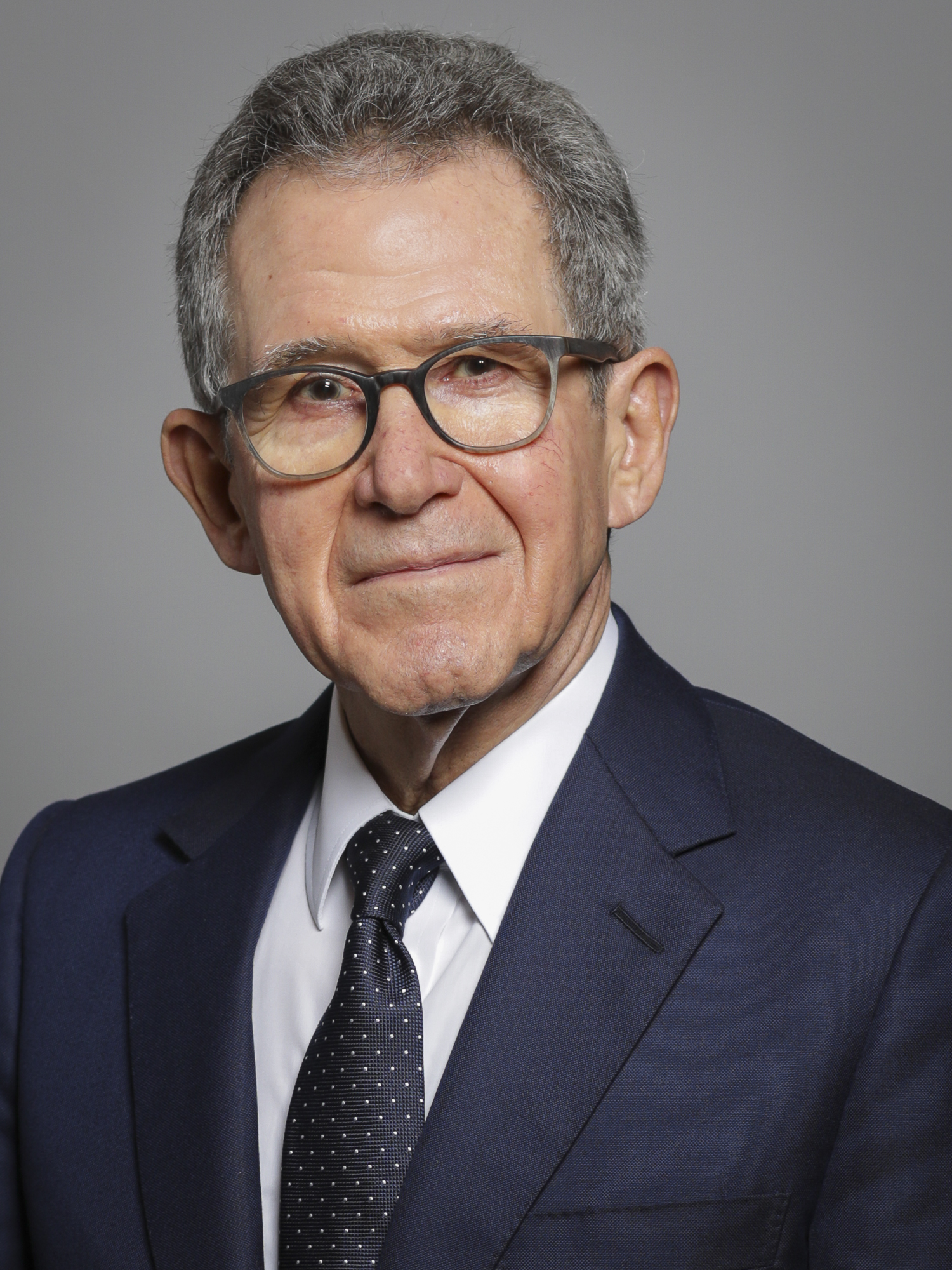
Candidate	The Lord Smith of Finsbury	Mohamed El-Erian
Party	Labour	Independent
Final stage	10,569 (55.6%)	8,440 (44.4%)
Seventh stage	8,003 (40.1%)	7,284 (36.5%)
Sixth stage	6,137 (31.2%)	6,246 (31.8%)
Fifth stage	5,397 (30.9%)	5,534 (31.7%)
Candidate	Sandi Toksvig	The Lord Browne of Madingley
Party	Independent	Crossbench
Final stage	Eliminated	Eliminated
Seventh stage	4,662 (23.4%)	Eliminated
Sixth stage	3,945 (20.1%)	3,344 (17.0%)
Fifth stage	3,599 (20.6%)	2,940 (16.8%)
Chancellor before election
The Lord Sainsbury of Turville
Elected Chancellor
The Lord Smith of Finsbury

The 2025 University of Cambridge election for the position of Chancellor was announced after the resignation of the incumbent, David Sainsbury, Baron Sainsbury of Turville. Chris Smith, Baron Smith of Finsbury was elected. The results were announced on 23 July 2025.

Nominations for the role closed on 2 May 2025. The term for the new Chancellor will be ten years; previous occupants of the role were appointed for life. Previous holders of the role include Prince Albert of Saxe-Coburg and Gotha; Prince Philip, Duke of Edinburgh; former Prime Ministers Stanley Baldwin, Arthur Balfour and Augustus FitzRoy, 3rd Duke of Grafton; and Nobel Laureates Edgar Adrian, 1st Baron Adrian and John Strutt, 3rd Baron Rayleigh.

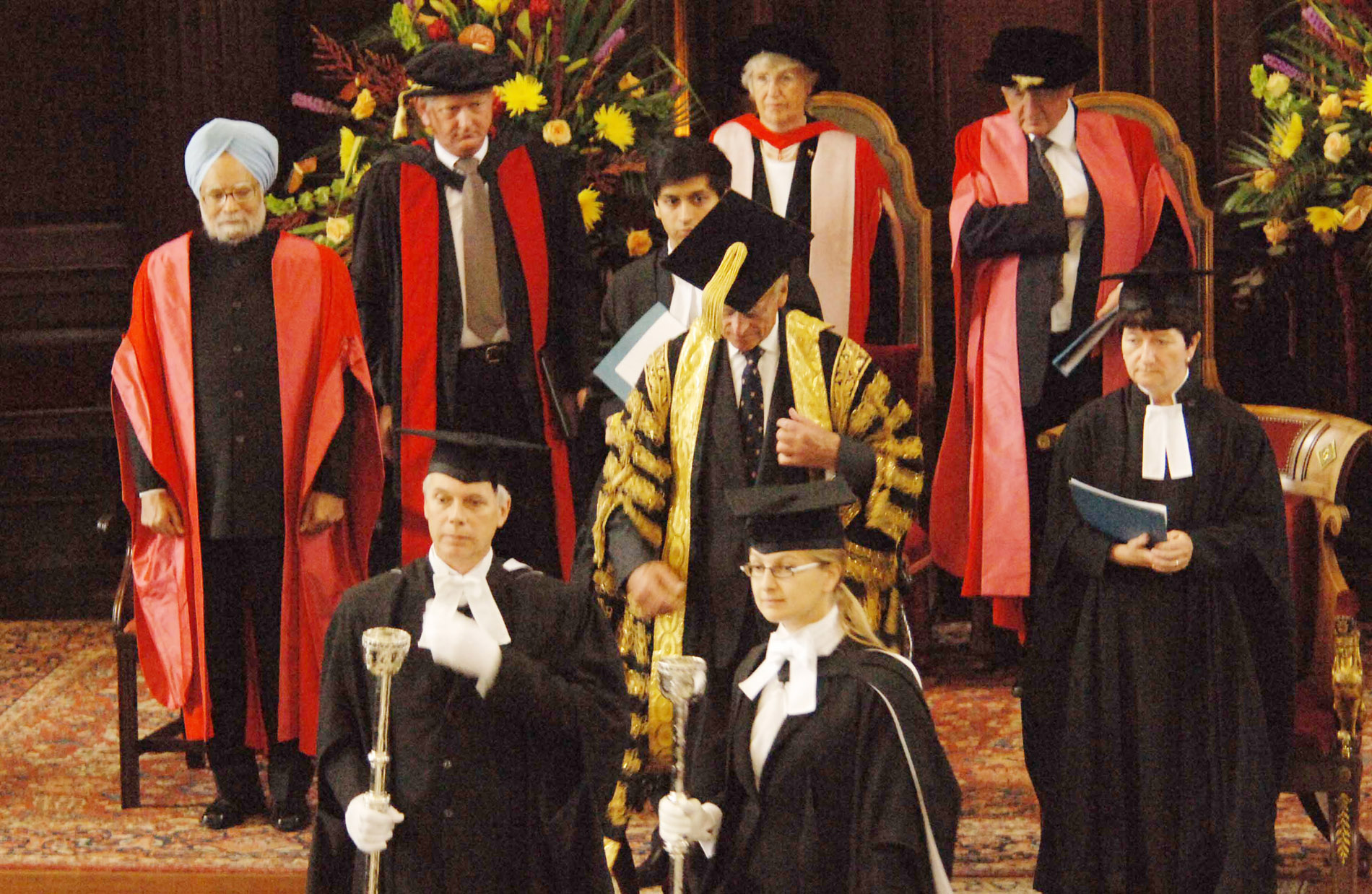
Prince Philip (centre) as Chancellor at an Honorary Degree Ceremony

== Electorate and voting ==
The 2011 election for Chancellorship was the first time the post had been contested since the 1950 University of Cambridge Chancellor election, and the first actively fought contest since the 1847 University of Cambridge Chancellor election.

The electorate consisted of the Senate: all members of the University holding a higher degree from Cambridge. In effect, every Cambridge graduate holding a degree other than a bachelor's degree (save the BD) had a vote. In addition, all members of the Regent House were also entitled to vote as they are automatically members of the Senate, even if they have no previous Cambridge degree; this includes most post-doctoral research staff who are also members of a faculty, and fellows of the colleges who do not hold a Cambridge degree.

Voting took place in person and wearing academic gowns at the Senate House in Cambridge on Saturday 12th and Wednesday 16 July between 10:00 and 17:00, and online between Wednesday 9th and Friday 18 July. Votes were counted using the Single Transferable Vote system, with voters ranking as many of the ten candidates as they chose.

== Candidates ==
All candidates required 50 nominations by 2 May. Ten confirmed candidates were announced by the University on 28 May, listed below in alphabetical order:

- Ayham Ammora — former oil executive
- Ali Azeem — former Treasury adviser and Conservative parliamentary candidate
- Tony Booth — academic, Extinction Rebellion activist
- John Browne, Baron Browne of Madingley — former CEO of BP, crossbench peer
- Mohamed El-Erian — former CEO of PIMCO, President of Queens' College, Cambridge
- Neil Wyn Evans — Cambridge Professor of Astrophysics
- Mark Mann — research consultant
- Gina Miller — businesswoman, anti-Brexit campaigner
- Chris Smith, Baron Smith of Finsbury — former Culture Secretary, Master of Pembroke College, Cambridge
- Sandi Toksvig — broadcaster and comedian; candidate in 2003 Oxford Chancellor election

In the period after nominations had formally opened, there was press speculation that a number of candidates could run, including Michael Portillo, James O'Shaughnessy, Baron O'Shaughnessy and broadcaster Emily Maitlis; but they all declined to run, with Maitlis instead publicly backing Mohamed El-Erian.

The Times Higher Education reported that there was no obvious front-runner in the contest, and noted that a number of Cambridge academics had expressed concerns about a television personality such as Sandi Toksvig taking the role previously held by Prime Ministers and Nobel Laureates. Toksvig's campaign launch provoked several responses focused on her stance on transgender issues. She was a co-founder of the Women's Equality Party, which supported gender self-identification, a policy on which universities were grappling following the UK Supreme Court ruling which found that 'sex' in the Equality Act 2010 referred to "the sex of a person at birth". THE also reported that the other woman in the field – Gina Miller – had been tipped by some to win, partly on account of the goodwill among largely Remain-supporting Cambridge alumni over her high-profile campaign in 2019 to prevent Brexit.

The Cambridge student newspaper, Varsity, reported that one candidate, Gina Miller, had accused another, Chris Smith, of a "serious breach" of electoral guidelines for using the Cambridge University logo in his campaign material. Smith commented that he had been approached by another candidate earlier that week with the same concerns, and had asked "Cantabs for Chris" to "remove the University crest from their logo immediately".

Varsity also reported that more than 250 people, including a significant number of Cambridge academics, had signed an open letter opposing the candidacy of John Browne, because of his authorship of the Browne Review of Higher Education, which led to the introduction of a 'market-driven' model of university funding, and because of his career in the fossil fuel industry.

The journalist and commentator Adam Boulton considered that Mohamed El-Erian and Lord Browne were the two serious candidates worthy of consideration, and endorsed Lord Browne for the role.

Cambridge Students' Union released a set of pledges ahead of the election, outlining the expectations it holds for candidates seeking the role and covering key areas including widening access, ethical investments, and engaging with societies. Eight candidates responded to the SU's proposals, with Ali Azeem and Sandi Toksvig not submitting responses.

== See also ==
- List of chancellors of the University of Cambridge
- 2011 University of Cambridge Chancellor election
- 2024 University of Oxford Chancellor election
- 2026 University of St Andrews Chancellor election
