= Ipswich Whitefriars =

Carmelite monastery in Suffolk, England

Ipswich Whitefriars was the medieval religious house of Carmelite friars (under a prior) which formerly stood near the centre of the town of Ipswich, the county town of Suffolk, UK. It was the last of the three principal mendicant communities to be founded in Ipswich, the first being the Ipswich Greyfriars (Franciscans), under Tibetot family patronage before 1236, and the second the Ipswich Blackfriars (Dominicans) founded by King Henry III in 1263. The house of the Carmelite Order of White Friars was established in c. 1278–79. In its heyday it was the home of many eminent scholars, supplied several Provincial superiors of the Order in England, and was repeatedly host to the provincial chapters of the Order.

All three houses were dissolved or suppressed in 1538, the Greyfriars in April and the other two in November. The Whitefriars stood south of the Ipswich Buttermarket street and mainly to the west of St Stephen's Lane, but nothing now remains visible above ground. The site was partly exposed by diggings in c. 1898, observed by Nina Layard, and very extensively excavated during the 1980s by the Suffolk County Council archaeologists. Of the three vanished friaries, the Greyfriars is now particularly notable for its distinguished patrons, the Blackfriars for knowledge of its buildings and the later public, charitable and educational purposes associated with them, and the Whitefriars for the rich story of its ecclesiastical and scholarly inmates. They were also noted for their production of books employing people in such trades as limners (illuminators of manuscripts), scriveners (copyists), bookbinders, leather curriers and quill pen makers.

== Foundation and site ==
The foundation is attributed by William Dugdale to Sir Thomas de Loudham (but by John Speed to Lord Bardesley, Sir Jeffrey Hadley and Sir Robert Norton) and to the date 1279. The founding was simultaneous with the Carmelite house at Winchester (1278), closely following a Carmelite provincial chapter held at Norwich. King Edward I visited Ipswich in 1277, and passed the Mortmain Act 1279 (7 Edw. 1) which gave many benefits to the Carmelites. The Order did not recognise the principle of filiation, so that Ipswich was not a daughter-house of Norwich, but looked only to the authority of the General and Provincial chapters. However, the first members of the new community were probably chosen from among those of Norwich.

The site chosen was in the centre of the town, in an area south of the Buttermarket street and north of Old Foundry Road, at first to the east of St Stephen's Lane and afterwards over much of the area from St Stephen's Lane westward toward Queen Street. This block corresponds roughly to the area occupied by the modern Ipswich Buttermarket shopping centre, erected c.1990. The Whitefriars lay on land of St Nicholas and St Lawrence parishes, though the Priory Gate (known as 'Stonehams') was in St Stephen's parish. During the Buttermarket excavations of 1987, the plundered footings of the Carmelite church were identified (beneath the site of the Buttermarket centre frontage), aligned at right-angles to St Stephen's Lane and with its east front overlooking the lower part of the lane.

St Stephen's Lane formed part of an ancient street leading north through Ipswich from a ford of the river Orwell, but its function as a northward route out of town had been curtailed since the building of the town ramparts during the 10th century. (A rubble-built wall running along the west side of this road, north and south, thought to be part of the Whitefriars perimeter wall, was seen during excavations in 1899.) The Carmelites obtained the right to enclose a town lane 150 yards long in January 1297 (when King Edward was again in Ipswich), and further purchases of land or alienations for the enlargement of the dwelling-house, were made to them c.1316, 1329 and 1332: a final enlargement was made by a purchase for 100 marks by Prior John Reppes in 1396.

== Early Provincials ==
The Ipswich house rapidly became involved in the leading affairs of the English province. An early Prior, Richard de Yllea (i.e. Monks Eleigh), had joined the Order after the death of his wife, and had received his own son Thomas into the Order. (Thomas became a very devout follower of the rule, took degrees at Cambridge, and wrote books on philosophy, theology and the Apocalypse.) Following the death of a provincial superior, a chapter was held at Ipswich in 1300, at which the then Ipswich Prior, William Ludlyngton (a native of Lincoln, who had studied at Oxford), was elected the new Provincial. Three years later, at a General chapter at Narbonne, the General superior Gerard of Boulogne announced his intention to split the English province by creating a separate Irish province. Ludlyngton, Thomas de Yllea and many others opposed him, but after a Papal intervention and a great chapter at London in 1305, Ludlyngton was forced to resign and was sent to Paris "to fast and to read Divinity", and Thomas de Yllea similarly was sent to Bruges as a lecturer.

- John Berkhamstead, a former Prior of Ipswich, was elected Provincial in 1312, and served until 1323.
- John Polested, a friar of Ipswich from his youth who afterwards studied at Oxford, became Vicar-General under the General Petrus de Casa (1330–1339) and Provincial from 1335 until his death in 1341: the author of more than twenty scholarly works, he was buried at York.
- John Kynyngham, another member of the Ipswich community, was elected Provincial of England and Ireland in a chapter at Yarmouth in 1393, and held it until his death in 1399. He was the confessor of John of Gaunt (and a witness to his will), and at Oxford frequently disputed with John Wycliffe. He wrote a disputative book against Wycliffe, and commentaries, treatises, sermons and 13 books on metaphysics.
- Friar Nicholas Kenton received his early education at Ipswich Whitefriars, before studying at Cambridge. He became renowned as historian, poet, philosopher, theologian and orator, and became chancellor of the University of Cambridge for 1445. He was elected Provincial of the Carmelite Order in 1444 and held it until his resignation in 1456. He was the author of many books including a Life of Saint Cyril of Constantinople, a Carmelite saint. He died in 1468.

== Ipswich Carmelite worthies ==
- Sir Thomas de Loudham, the supposed founder, was buried in the monastery church.
- John Paschal, of a noble Suffolk family, entered the Order at Ipswich and studied there before taking A.B. at Cambridge in 1333. Famed for his learning, speaking and volumes of over 150 sermons, he became Bishop of Scutari (1344) and Bishop of Llandaff (1347–1361).
- Friar John, a native of Bury St Edmunds, author of many commentaries on the scriptures, lived at Ipswich Whitefriars and died there soon after 1350.
- Friar Richard Lavyngham of Suffolk (fl. 1380) took the habit at the Ipswich Whitefriars. He later proceeded to Oxford where he became an extremely scholarly philosopher and theologian, devoted to bringing heretics back to orthodoxy by force of argument. He was famous for his lectures, covering the entire course of study, the texts of which are contained in more than 90 volumes. His Middle English treatise on the seven deadly sins contains his accusations against the views of the Wycliffite John Purvey, and is a carefully organized work. His works included one on the origin of the Carmelite Order. He became Carmelite Prior at Bristol. Some authors claim that he was slain with Simon of Sudbury, Archbishop of Canterbury, in 1381.
- John Balsham (c. 1357–1425), formerly Bishop of Argyll, died and was buried here.
- John Barmyngham, elected Prior c. 1440, died in 1448. He held doctorates from Oxford and Paris, and was considered one of the finest scholars of his time. There was a second John Barmyngham (friar), probably a relative, who died in 1458.
- Thomas Lavenham (or Lavyngham), an Ipswich Carmelite author of a Commentary on Aristotle's Physics, became one of the first fellows of All Souls College, Oxford in 1447.

== Other affairs ==
During the mid-14th century Sir Geoffrey Badley joined the Ipswich Whitefriars, one of several knights attracted to the order who, however, held only junior positions owing to their lack of learning. Edmund de Bromfield, Abbot nominee of Bury St Edmund's, took refuge with the Ipswich Carmelites in 1379 when his monks had driven him out: the house of the Rector of St Stephen's church, close to the Whitefriars, was ransacked in the Peasants' Revolt of 1381. Around 1400 here began the Institute of Recluses, the early female department of the Order. There was a very devoted woman at Ipswich named Agnes, who had a remarkable spirit of prayer and penance. The Recluses observed the rule closely, having a mostly vegetarian diet, wearing hair shirts, waking at midnight throughout the winter and at dawn in summer, fasting on Fridays and Saturdays (bread and ale only on Fridays), and devoting much time to prayers.

In 1452 the Whitefriars entertained King Henry VI with his entire suite. Over the next 25 years the church was entirely rebuilt (creating the structure revealed by excavation). The new church was consecrated in 1477 by Friar Thomas Bradley (Scrope), Bishop of Dromore. It is known from a will dated 1463 that there was a chapel to St John the Baptist in the Whitefriars church, where the benefactor desired to be buried and to have Masses sung for his soul. Town burgesses and merchants sought to arrange for their funerals and burials to take place in the church, and there are sundry records of bequests. Henry Fulslo left a barrel of beer to each of the three orders of Friars in Ipswich, in 1486: John Whelmeton, a tailor, left a cloak for every Ipswich friar in 1495.

== The last days ==
John Bale (b. 1495), later Bishop of Ossory, was educated at the Norwich Carmelite house and at Cambridge University, and was elected (the last) Prior of Ipswich Carmelites in 1533. While at Ipswich he wrote a number of works, and made an intensive survey of the writers of Britain whose works were preserved in the monastic libraries of his time. He appears to have left the office before the house was finally dissolved. In its last days the community became extremely impoverished, and were compelled to sell several of their messuages to raise money for their food, the Visitor having allowed them only £4 a year as a pittance. The Prior and his co-brethren made a petition to Thomas Cromwell (the text of which is preserved) showing that a man named Copping had withheld his dues to them. The reply is not recorded, but the outcome was the end of the monastery. The Ancient House, Ipswich, on land not far from the Priory Gate, was acquired by one George Copping in 1567 and substantially renovated. Part of the monastic buildings were used for the town gaol or Sessions House for a time, but that was demolished in 1698: most traces of the Whitefriars disappeared very rapidly.
