= Asgarby =

Asgarby may refer to the following places in Lincolnshire, England:

- Asgarby, East Lindsey, near Spilsby
- Asgarby, North Kesteven, near Sleaford

== See also ==
- Asgarby and Howell, a civil parish in Lincolnshire, England
- John de Asgarby, Chancellor of the University of Cambridge in 1267
