= 1626 University of Cambridge Chancellor election =

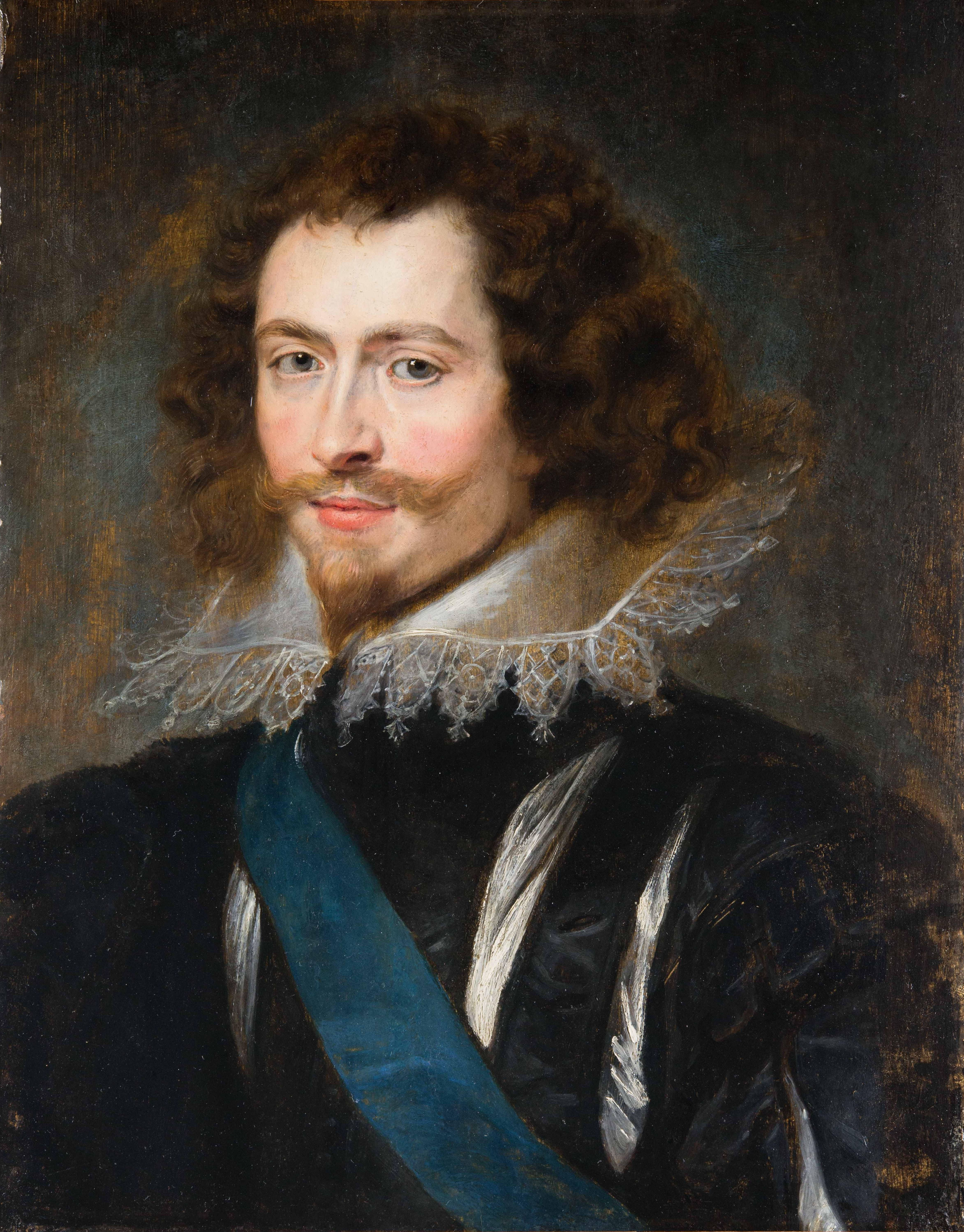
Buckingham, who was elected, portrait by the workshop of Rubens

The election for the Chancellorship of the University of Cambridge, 1626, chose a new Chancellor of the university. There were two candidates for the post, George Villiers, 1st Duke of Buckingham, supported by the king, and Thomas Howard, 1st Earl of Berkshire, a son of the Chancellor who had just died.

== Background ==
The election was brought about by the death on 28 March 1626 of the previous Chancellor, the Earl of Suffolk. A past Lord High Treasurer who had fallen from office, Suffolk had owned Audley End House, near Cambridge, said to be the largest private house in England, and at the time of his death was Lord Lieutenant of Cambridgeshire and also of Suffolk.

While holding a largely ceremonial position, the Chancellor was nevertheless influential in the university, and monarchs of England liked to have their supporters in such key positions. Charles I had been on the throne for barely a year and was anxious to have his supporters in significant offices.

== Campaigns ==
Suffolk died at his great house at Charing Cross, so that the news came to the court before it reached the university. The day after the death, 29 March, the chaplain of George Montaigne, Bishop of London, arrived in Cambridge bearing a message from his master to report that King Charles wished to see his father's favourite Buckingham elected as the new Chancellor. However, Thomas Howard, 1st Earl of Berkshire, one of the dead man's eight sons, decided to contest the election. A fierce contest ensued, later described by James Bass Mullinger as "essentially one between the two great theological parties of the time".

Buckingham was strongly supported by Leonard Mawe, himself recently appointed by the King as Master of Trinity, the most important college. On the morning of the election, Mawe summoned all the fellows of Trinity and pressed them to vote for Buckingham.

== Ballot and outcome ==
The university's Statutes of 1570 gave the heads of houses considerable influence in such elections, chiefly because there was no secret ballot, and of all the doctors of the university in residence only one, Dr George Porter, President of Queens' College and Regius Professor of Civil Law, voted for Berkshire. In the event, many fellows of colleges who were expected to do likewise abstained by staying away from the election.

Buckingham was declared the winner, but with a majority over Berkshire of only three votes. Some men present doubted the result and thought of challenging it, but it was decided not to do so.

== See also ==
- List of chancellors of the University of Cambridge
