= Richard Badew =

British academic administrator

Richard Badew (died 1361) was a Vice Chancellor and Chancellor of the University of Cambridge in the 14th century. He was responsible for the foundation of University Hall, Cambridge (now Clare College) in 1326.
