= 1811 University of Cambridge Chancellor election =

The University of Cambridge Chancellor election, 1811 was an election for the post of Chancellor of Cambridge University. The election was triggered by the death of the previous incumbent, Augustus FitzRoy, 3rd Duke of Grafton, and it was the first contested election for the post since 1748.

There were two candidates for the post: His Highness Prince William, Duke of Gloucester and Edinburgh, and John Manners, 5th Duke of Rutland.

== Election ==
The result was as follows:

Candidate	Votes	%
Prince William Frederick, Duke of Gloucester and Edinburgh	470	56.9
John Manners, 5th Duke of Rutland	356	43.1
Turnout	826	
The Duke of Gloucester and Edinburgh elected

== See also ==
- List of chancellors of the University of Cambridge
