= 1748 University of Cambridge Chancellor election =

The election for the Chancellorship of the University of Cambridge, 1748 chose a new Chancellor of the university. The election was triggered by the retirement of the previous incumbent, Charles Seymour, 6th Duke of Somerset, in February 1748.

== Two candidates ==
There were two candidates for the post: the heir to the throne, Frederick, Prince of Wales, and the cabinet minister Thomas Pelham-Holles, 1st Duke of Newcastle.

== Election of the Duke of Newcastle ==
A contest ensued, and on 6 July, the Duke of Newcastle was duly declared elected. According to Elisabeth Leedham-Green, Newcastle's victory "had been the result of much strenuous political activity by his supporters." William Coxe wrote in his Memoirs of the "mortification" felt by the Prince at his failure to secure election.

== Campaign promises about the Church of England ==
Edmund Pyle, the king's chaplain, later wrote of Newcastle's "pitiful passion for the Chancellorship of Cambridge" and of his having made promises of Church of England preferments in the course of his campaign.

== See also ==
- List of chancellors of the University of Cambridge
