= Plictho of Gioanventura Rosetti =

First printed book on dyeing

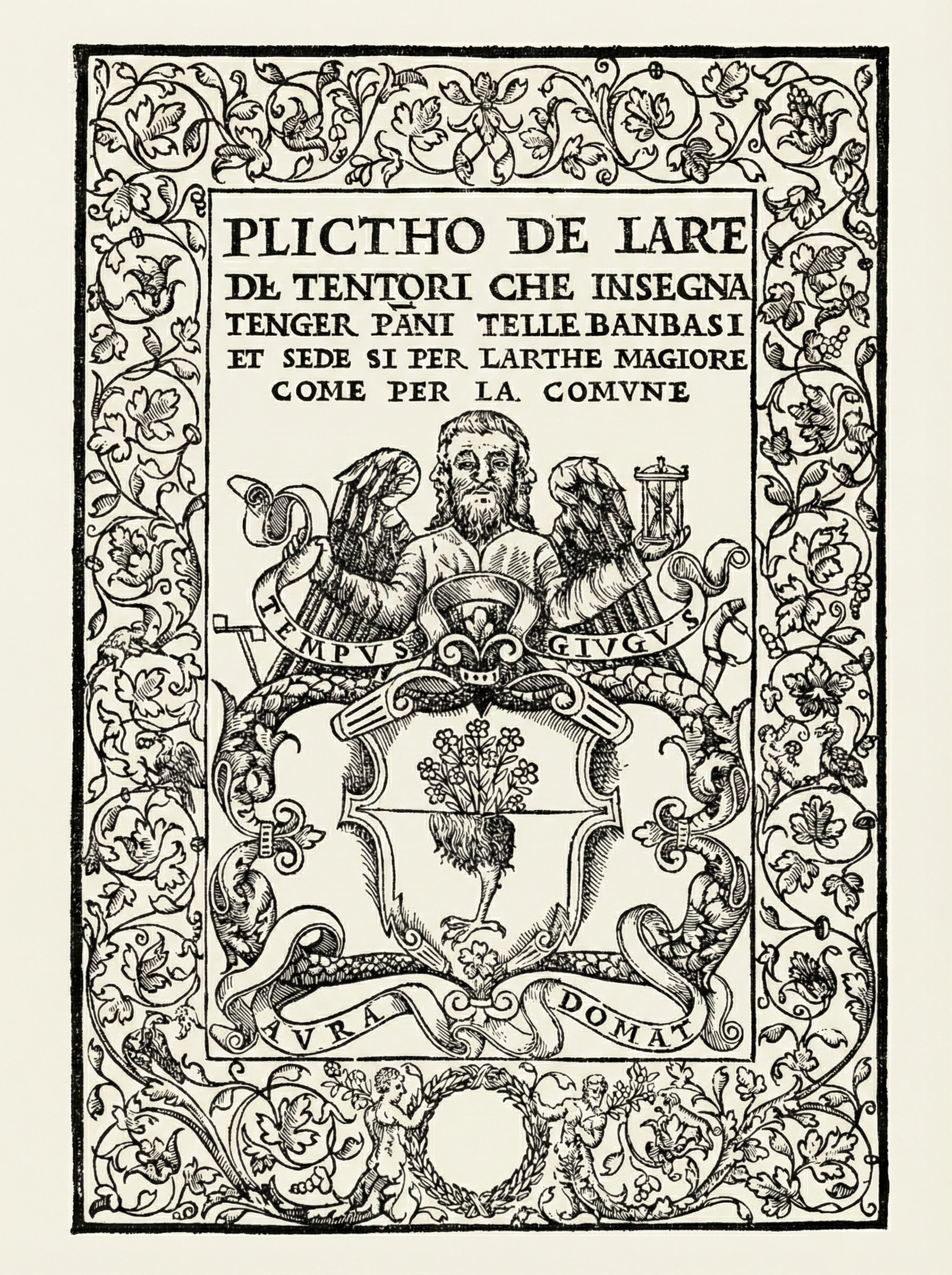
- Title page of the "1540" edition
- Author: Gioanventura Rosetti
- Original title: Plictho de l'arte de tentori
- Language: Italian and Venetian
- Subject: Dyeing, Tanning of leather
- Publisher: Agustino Bindoni
- Publication date: 1548
- Publication place: Republic of Venice
- English publication date: 1969

The Plictho of Gioanventura Rosetti (full title: Plictho de l'arte de tentori, or "Instructions in the Art of the Dyers") is a technical manual on dyeing and tanning of leather published in Venice in 1548. It is considered the first basic printed book on the subject of dyeing.

Historians of technology rank the importance of the Plictho alongside Vannoccio Biringuccio's Pirotechnia (1540) and Georgius Agricola's De re metallica (1556). Prior to its publication, the art of dyeing was a secret technology guarded by practitioners; Rosetti's work was the first to fully reveal the technical state of the art in the mid-16th century.

== Title and authorship ==
The work was compiled by Gioanventura Rosetti, an employee of the Venetian Arsenal. Rosetti stated that he spent sixteen years gathering recipes from Venice, Genoa, Florence, and other Italian cities. Little is known of his life other than that he was born in Venice, worked at the arsenal as early as 1530, and published one other work, Notandissimi Secreti De L'arte Profumatoria (1555).

The word "Plictho" in the title has been the subject of historical debate, often mistaken for the name of the author or an ancient Greek term. It is a precursor to the Italian word plico, meaning a collection of papers or instructions.

The text is written in the Italian of Tuscany but contains many Venetian dialect words and phrases, particularly in the technical descriptions.

== Content ==
The Plictho is divided into four sections covering the dyeing of wool, cotton, linen, and silk, as well as the tanning and dyeing of leather. It contains both practical commercial formulas and various "secrets," including the first known printed formula for producing hydrochloric acid.

=== Textiles ===
The textile sections contain approximately 160 recipes.

- Reds: The book contains roughly 35 recipes for red shades. Rosetti documents the extensive use of Brazilwood (vergino), particularly for linen and cotton, despite it producing a fugitive (non-colorfast) dye. Other red dyes mentioned include kermes and madder (robia).
- Blues and Yellows: The book indicates a shift in the 16th century toward the use of indigo over woad due to the former's lower cost and greater brilliance. Yellows were produced using young fustic, corniola, or weld.
- Blacks: There are 21 recipes for black dyes, mostly relying on iron salts combined with tannins from gallnuts or sumac.

=== Leather ===
The fourth section contains 50 recipes for leather and skins. It details processes such as using lime water for dehairing and treating skins with alum (tawing) followed by egg yolk or oil to create a chamois-like leather. Unlike the textile section, the leather recipes rely heavily on indigo for blues and brazilwood for reds.

== Publication history ==
The first edition was published in Venice in 1548 by Agustino Bindoni. Although a "1540" edition is sometimes cited, evidence suggests this was a misprinted 1560 edition or a printer accidental transposition of numerals, making 1548 the true first edition.

Subsequent editions include:

- 1565: Printed by Lelio Bariletto; the first edition to clearly separate the text into four books.
- 1611: Printed by Alessandro Vecchi.
- 1672: Printed by Zattoni; considered an inferior printing.
- 1716: A French translation titled Suite du Teinturier Parfait. This version contains numerous errors and omissions where the translator did not understand Rosetti's formulas.
- 1969: The first English translation, published by MIT Press, translated and edited by Sidney Edelstein and Hector C. Borghetty.

== Sources ==
- Adrosko, Rita J. (1970). "The Plictho of Gioanventura Rosetti ed. by Sidney M. Edelstein, Hector C. Borghetty (review)". Technology and Culture. 11 (4): 623–625. doi:10.1353/tech.1970.a894053. ISSN 1097-3729.
- Edelstein, Sidney M.; Borghetty, Hector C. (1969). The Plictho of Gioanventura Rosetti. Cambridge, Massachusetts: MIT Press.
- Freeman, H. S.; Mock, G. N. (2007). "Dye Application, Manufacture of Dye Intermediates and Dyes". Kent and Riegel's Handbook of Industrial Chemistry and Biotechnology. Boston, MA: Springer US. doi:10.1007/978-0-387-27843-8_13. ISBN 978-0-387-27842-1.
