= Nicholas Kenton =

Nicholas Kenton (d. 4 September 1468) was an English monk who gained a reputation as a historian, poet, philosopher, theologian, and orator. He was Chancellor of Cambridge University 1445–1446.

He was born at Kenton, Suffolk and joined the Carmelite order at Ipswich.
