= John Bale =

Anglican bishop in Ireland

The Right Reverend John Bale
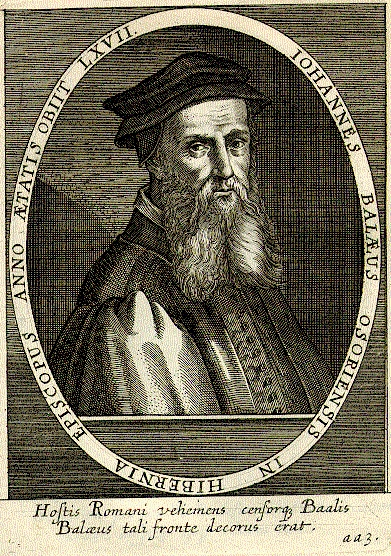
- Church: Church of Ireland
- See: Ossory
- Appointed: 22 October 1552
- Installed: 2 February 1553
- Term ended: September 1553
- Predecessor: Milo Baron, OSA
- Successor: John Tonory, OSA

Orders
- Consecration: 2 February 1553 by George Browne

Personal details
- Born: 21 November 1495 Covehithe, Suffolk, Kingdom of England
- Died: 17 November 1563 (aged 67) Canterbury, Kent, Kingdom of England
- Denomination: Catholic Church, Protestant Christianity
- Occupation: Churchman, historian and controversialist. Wrote Illustrium majoris Britanniae scriptorum, hoc est, Angliae, Cambriae, ac Scotiae Summarium (1548–49)
- Education: Jesus College, Cambridge

John Bale (21 November 1495 – 17 November 1563) was an English churchman, historian controversialist, and Bishop of Ossory in Ireland. He wrote the oldest known historical verse drama in English, King Johan, which depictes King John in a virtuous struggle against the Catholic Church. Bale also developed and published a very extensive list of the works of British authors down to his own time, just as the monastic libraries were being dispersed. His contention that Joseph of Arimathea had brought a proto-Protestant faith to Britain that was purer than Catholicism was to have far-reaching ramifications; but his unhappy disposition and habit of quarrelling earned him the nickname "bilious Bale".

== Outline of his life ==
He was born at Covehithe, near Dunwich in Suffolk. At the age of twelve he joined the Carmelite friars at Norwich, removing later to the house of "Holme", possibly the Carmelite Hulne Priory near Alnwick in Northumberland. Later he entered Jesus College, Cambridge, and took his degree of B.D. in 1529.

He became the last Prior of the Ipswich Carmelite house, elected in 1533. He abandoned his monastic vocation, and got married, saying, "that I might never more serve so execrable a beast, I took to wife the faithful Dorothy". He obtained the living of Thorndon, Suffolk, but in 1534 was summoned before the Archbishop of York for a sermon against the invocation of saints preached at Doncaster, and afterwards before John Stokesley, Bishop of London, but he escaped through the powerful protection of Thomas Cromwell, whose notice he is said to have attracted by his miracle plays.

In these plays, Bale denounced the monastic system and its supporters in unrestrained language and coarse imagery. The prayer of Infidelitas which opens the second act of his Three Laws is an example of his profane parody. These somewhat brutal productions were intended to impress popular feeling, and Cromwell found in him an invaluable instrument. When Cromwell fell from favour in 1540, Bale fled with his wife and children to Antwerp. He returned on the accession of King Edward VI, and received the living of Bishopstoke, Hampshire, being promoted in 1552 to the Irish see of Ossory. He refused to be consecrated by the Roman Catholic rites of the Irish church, and won his point, though the Dean of Dublin made a protest against the revised office during the ceremony. He also quarrelled bitterly with the aged and respected judge Thomas St. Lawrence, who travelled to Kilkenny to urge the people to reject his innovations.

When the accession of Queen Mary inaugurated a violent reaction in matters of religion, he was forced to get out of the country again. He tried to escape to Scotland, but on the voyage was captured by a Dutch man-of-war, which was driven by bad weather into St Ives, Cornwall. Bale was arrested on suspicion of treason, but soon released. At Dover he had another narrow escape, but he eventually made his way to the Netherlands and thence to Frankfurt and Basel. Bale's intent in his autobiographical Vocacyon was to write a polemical account of his escape from Ireland in parallel with the life of St Paul. Although Vocacyon is a broadly true account, Bale possessed a "self-dramatizing tendency".

During his exile, he devoted himself to writing. After his return, on the accession of Queen Elizabeth I, he received (1560) a prebendal stall at Canterbury, where he died and was buried in the cathedral.

== Mysteries, Miracle Plays, Kynge Johan ==
John Bale attacked his enemies with vehemence and scurrility, much of which was directed strongly and forcibly against the Roman Catholic Church and its writers: but this cavil does not significantly diminish the value of his contributions to literature. (The Roman Catholic sympathiser and antiquary Anthony Wood, a man of "uncouth manners" and a condemned libeller, described him as "foul-mouthed Bale" a century afterwards.) Of his mysteries and miracle plays only five have been preserved, but the titles of the others, quoted by himself in his Catalogus, show that they were animated by the same political and religious aims. The Three Laws of Nature, Moses and Christ, corrupted by the Sodomytes, Pharisees and Papystes most wicked (produced in 1538 and again in 1562) was a morality play. The direction for the dressing of the parts is instructive: "Let Idolatry be decked like an old witch, Sodomy like a monk of all sects, Ambition like a bishop, Covetousness like a Pharisee or spiritual lawyer, False Doctrine like a popish doctor, and Hypocrisy like a gray friar." A Tragedye; or enterlude manifesting the chief promyses of God unto Man, The Temptacyon of our Lorde, and A brefe Comedy or Enterlude of Johan Baptystes preachynge in the Wyldernesse, etc. were all written in 1538.

=== Kynge Johan ===
Bale is a figure of some literary-dramatic importance as the author of Kynge Johan (c. 1538), which marks the transition between the old morality play and the English historical drama. It does not appear to have directly influenced the creators of the chronicle histories (such as The Troublesome Reign of King John (1591)), but it is remarkable that such a developed attempt at historical drama should have been made twenty-three years before the production of Gorboduc in 1561. Kynge Johan is itself a polemic against the Roman Catholic Church. King John is represented as the champion of English church rites against the Holy See.

== Summary of the Famous Writers of Great Britain ==
Bale's most important work is Illustrium Maioris Britanniae scriptorum, hoc est, Angliae, Cambriae ac Scotiae summarium ("Summary of the Famous Writers of Great Britain, that is, of England, Wales and Scotland"), published at Ipswich by John Overton in 1548, and at Wesel by Derick van der Straten in 1549. This first edition contains authors through five centuries. Another edition, almost entirely rewritten and containing fourteen centuries, was printed at Basel by Johannes Oporinus with the title Scriptorum illustrium Maioris Brytanniae, quam nunc Angliam & Scotiam vocant, catalogus ("Catalogue of the Famous Writers of Great Britain, which now they call England and Scotland") in 1557, completed by a latter part in 1559.

This chronological catalogue of British authors and their works was partly founded on the De uiris illustribus of John Leland. Bale was an indefatigable collector and worker, and personally examined many of the valuable libraries of the Augustinian and Carmelite houses before their dissolution. His work contains much information that would otherwise have been hopelessly lost. His autograph note-book is preserved in the Selden Collection of the Bodleian Library, Oxford. It contains the materials collected for his two published catalogues arranged alphabetically, without enlargement on them nor the personal remarks which colour the completed work. He includes the sources for his information. He noted: "I have bene also at Norwyche, our second citye of name, and there all the library monuments are turned to the use of their grossers, candelmakers, sopesellers, and other worldly occupyers... As much have I saved there and in certen other places in Northfolke and Southfolke concerning the authors names and titles of their workes, as I could, and as much wold I have done throughout the whole realm, yf I had been able to have borne the charges, as I am not."

== Other writings and catalogues ==
John Bale's written works are listed in Athenae Cantabrigienses. While in Germany he published an attack on the monastic system entitled The Actes of Englysh Votaries, three Lives as The Examinations of Lord Cobham, William Thorpe and Anne Askewe, &c, and the Pageant of Popes. The Actes of Englysh Votaries is chiefly significant for its appropriation of the legend of Joseph of Arimathea for the Protestant cause. Joseph's alleged early arrival in Britain had already been gleefully exploited by theologians and diplomats to enhance English claims to precedence. Bale's innovation was to contend that the faith which Joseph brought, was also purer than that of Rome: "the Brytaynes toke the christen faythe at the verye sprynge or fyrst goynge forth of the Gospell, whan the churche was most perfyght, and had most strengthe of the holye ghost". It was a claim that was enthusiastically taken up by English Protestants, including Queen Elizabeth I. While Rector of Bishopstoke he produced The Image of Both Churches, and after his stormy association with Ossory he printed an account of his "Vocacyon" to that see. The Resurreccion of the Masse, purporting to be written by one Hugh Hilarie, is generally attributed to Bale.

John Pitts or Pitseus (1560–1616), an English Roman Catholic exile, founded on Bale's work his Relationum historicarum de rebus anglicis tomus primus (Paris, 1619), better known by its running title of De Illustribus Angliae scriptoribus. This is really the fourth book of a more extensive work. He omits the Wycliffite and Protestant divines mentioned by Bale, and the most valuable section is the lives of the Roman Catholic exiles resident in Douai and other French towns. He asserts (Nota de Joanne Bale) that Bale's Catalogus was a misrepresentation of John Leland's work, though in all likelihood he only knew Leland's work through his reading of Bale.

=== The Image of Both Churches ===
The Image of Both Churches was published by John Bale in 1545, and is a detailed commentary on the Book of Revelation, the last book in the Christian Bible. Bale proceeded by taking short passages and following with a detailed paraphrase to explain the meaning and significance of such things as the opening of the seven seals, the first beast, the second beast with two horns, the blowing of the trumpets, and the going forth of the horsemen. Of central concern was the correct identification of the Antichrist.

Bale's central thesis is that the Book of Revelation is a prophecy of how God's word and those who love it (the "saints") would fare at the hands of men and a false Church during the last age, meaning the time between the ascension of Jesus and the end of the world.

Bale identified two types of churches. First, there was a false church, or Church of Antichrist, which persecutes those who do not bow to its dictates. He did not entirely limit his criticism to the Roman Church but, typical of the Puritans, accused also the young Church of England. By contrast, the "true Church" loves and teaches God's word truly. He also speaks critically of the Church of Mohammed ("Mahomet"): its tyranny over the people (the "Turks") and persecution of the saints.

== In popular culture ==
He is the central figure in the 1988 novel Books of Bale by the novelist and playwright John Arden. He also appears in C. J. Sansom's quasi-historical novel, Lamentation set in the last part of Henry VIII's reign.

== See also ==
- Dissolution of the Monasteries
- Foxe's Book of Martyrs
- Carmelites
- Ipswich Whitefriars
