= 1950 University of Cambridge Chancellor election =

An election for the Chancellorship of the University of Cambridge was held in November 1950 after the death of the incumbent Chancellor, Jan Smuts. There was a contested election as the University of Cambridge's establishment's candidate, Lord Tedder, was opposed by a group of Dons who favoured Jawaharlal Nehru. Nehru was nominated without giving him an opportunity to withdraw, and although honoured by the nomination, felt he could be of no service to the University. Although Nehru (who found opinion in India was against his being nominated) eventually persuaded his supporters to withdraw his name, a nominal election was required and took place on Friday 10 November, Tedder being declared the winner but without disclosing the number of votes cast.

== Candidates ==
Early speculation about suitable names for the new Chancellor centred on Earl Mountbatten of Burma, or the Duke of Gloucester. An editorial in the student newspaper Varsity on 14 October 1950 began by stating clearly "The person we would like to see installed as Chancellor of Cambridge University is obviously someone of wide repute within the British Commonwealth" and suggested that Pandit Nehru, Prime Minister of India, was such a person. The editorial praised Nehru for maintaining impartiality in the Korean War, repeatedly advising peaceful resolution of international disputes, and not allowing India to become part of the spheres of influence of either the USA or USSR. Nehru had studied at Cambridge (Trinity College, 1907-1910).

An informal meeting of the Senate held on Saturday 14 October 1950 recommended Lord Tedder, who had been Deputy Supreme Commander under Eisenhower during the closing stages of World War II and recently retired as Chief of the Air Staff. Tedder had also studied at Cambridge (Magdalene College, 1909-1913). After the meeting a fly-sheet was circulated inviting signatures from members of the Senate to nominate Tedder, and giving a list of those who already intended to sign. The list included most heads of Colleges and members of the council of the Senate, the University's principal governing institution. Tedder was recommended on the basis of his military experience, and connections with Cambridge: he had been made an honorary Fellow of his old College, and received an honorary Doctorate. Chemistry professor Ronald G.W. Norrish, one of his supporters, explained that choosing Nehru would be suitable if the University had wanted to "take an active part in the world of politics", but that Tedder was suitable because he was not a political figure.

== Contest ==
In response, a fly-sheet in favour of Nehru was published on Wednesday 25 October, said to be a spontaneous reaction against the suggestion of Tedder, and it was said that it started with well over 100 signatures. Those supporting Nehru argued that support in him would show how highly the "virtues of peace" were valued, and noted that almost all the names supporting Tedder were very senior figures. When nominations closed, there were a total of 333 names nominating Tedder and 153 nominating Nehru. Some well-known Cambridge graduates supported the Nehru campaign, including Bertrand Russell, E. M. Forster, R. A. Butler and Lord Mountbatten. The date of election was set for 10 November and the hours of polling were extended into the evening in anticipation of heavy participation by members of the Senate; as every recipient of a Master of Arts degree was a member of the Senate, and Cambridge raised every graduate to this degree six years after matriculation, almost every Cambridge graduate was eligible to vote.

Some concern was raised by Varsity that the announcement of the election procedure specified that the names of voters, and the candidate for whom they had voted, would be published. The announcement had said this was "in accordance with ancient custom" but it was noted that the regulations had not been altered since the introduction of the secret ballot for Parliamentary elections. It was later speculated that the reason for announcing that votes would be published was to intimidate senior members who were planning to vote for Nehru. On behalf of Nehru, a circular was sent to all Masters of Arts and transport was said to be being arranged from London and Oxford, as all votes had to be cast in person. One letter in Varsity regretted the contested election and pointed out Nehru's supporters' wish to further Anglo-Indian understanding would be undermined if Nehru was defeated and the election "attracted the attention of racial or political propagandists".

== Nehru withdraws ==
The High Commissioner of India to the United Kingdom, V. K. Krishna Menon, was notified that a delegation would be arriving on 23 October to report their desire to nominate Nehru. He sent a telegram to Nehru, mistakenly referring to the vacant office as that of the Vice-Chancellor, and commenting that opinion within the University was in Nehru's favour. Nehru cabled back on the following day correcting the error, and instructing Krishna Menon to tell the delegation that he was "deeply sensible of honour especially coming from my old University" but that he could not accept when he could be of no service. He stressed that it would be undesirable to enter into a contested election. Nehru cabled again on 30 October when his nomination was announced, complaining that "embarrassing questions are put to me" and stated "on no account am I going to be a party to a contest". Krishna Menon replied that the Vice-Chancellor had formally written asking whether Nehru accepted nomination; he noted that in 1847 Prince Albert had not consented to nomination but did not interfere when he was actually nominated. Nehru consulted Lord Pethick-Lawrence, and replied at length on 2 November explaining that reaction in India were "strongly unfavourable" to his contesting the election, and imploring Krishna Menon to get his supporters to withdraw his name. One of Nehru's biographers has claimed that "it was generally recognized that in any election Nehru would carry the majority".

It was not until after the notice of election was published that the Vice-Chancellor received a letter signed by ten of Nehru's supporters indicating that Nehru did not wish to accept nomination, but as this decision had been communicated after the last date for withdrawal, a nominal election had to go ahead. The time allowed for votes to be cast was altered from the initial plan of 9 AM to 9 PM, and reduced to 2 PM to 2:30 PM. It was also announced that the names of voters and their votes would not be published.

Nehru's supporters in Cambridge were reluctant to comply with his wishes, arguing that they had the right to elect whom they wished. However Krishna Menon did persuade them that Nehru would be embarrassed by a contested election. The Cambridge Union Society passed (by 158 to 129) an emergency resolution regretting Nehru's withdrawal on Wednesday 8 November, with Percy Cradock arguing in favour.

== Result ==
Just under 200 people voted, during drizzling rain. After half an hour of voting, the Senior Proctor announced that Tedder had been duly elected, without giving any figures.

== See also ==
- List of chancellors of the University of Cambridge
