= Richard de Billingford =

British academic

Richard de Billingford (died 1432) was Chancellor of the University of Cambridge, holding the position three times, from 1400–1402, 1406-1413 and in 1432.

From 1398 to 1432 he was also Master of Corpus Christi College, Cambridge, where he endowed a loan chest in which college members could deposit valuable objects as security for loans taken from the chest which would be sold if the loan was not repaid. The extant chest is kept in the Parker Library, Corpus Christi College. He was buried in St Bene't's Church, which was formerly used as the college chapel.

In 1413 as Chancellor he was sent by Henry V to Rome during the Western Schism as part of a delegation to tell the two Popes that unless one would step down, the King would recognise neither.
