= King Johan =

1538 English play about King John

King Johan is a sixteenth-century English play. Written by a former Carmelite friar named John Bale, it is considered a possible influence on William Shakespeare's later work King John. The play was groundbreaking as it was the first English-language play to cast a historical English monarch as a character of virtue.

== Play ==
The play was written by Bale in 1538 and significantly revised during the reign of Elizabeth I. Considered a piece of Protestant propaganda, the play told the story of John, King of England, who reigned during the thirteenth century in England. King John is represented as the champion of English church rites, as opposed to the Catholic Pope:—

"This noble Kynge Johan, as a faythfull Moses
Withstode proude Pharao for his poore Israel."

But the English people remained in the bondage of Rome,—

"Tyll that duke Josue, whych was our late Kynge Henrye,
Clerely brought us out in to the lande of mylke and honye."

Elsewhere John is called a Lollard and accused of "heretycall langage." Allegorical characters are mixed with the real persons in the play. John is shown to be against a number of Catholic villains, but is eventually assassinated by Sedition and Dissimulation before being defended by Verity. Ynglonde vidua (Widow England) represents the nation, and the jocular element is provided by Sedwyson (sedition), occupying the role of Vice in a pure morality play. One actor was obviously intended to play many parts, for stage directions such as "Go out Ynglond, and dress for Clargy" are by no means uncommon.

King Johan debuted in the royal court of Henry VIII, and was unlikely to have been performed beyond the 1560s. The play itself was probably intended to reflect sixteenth-century England, as the play acted as an affirmation of the King of England's rejection of European Catholicism.

== Rediscovery of the manuscript ==
The original manuscript of Kynge Johan was discovered between 1831 and 1838 among the papers of Ipswich Corporation (i.e. local government for Ipswich). The play was probably performed there, as there are references to charitable foundations by King John in the town (which received its Town Charter from John in 1200 AD) and neighbourhood. It is described at the end of the manuscript as two plays, but there is no obvious division, only the end of the first act being noted. The first part is corrected by Bale: the second half is in his handwriting, but his name nowhere occurs. In the list of his works, however, he mentions a play De Joanne Anglorum Rege (Of King John of the English), written in idiomate materno (in the mother tongue).

The text was edited by John Payne Collier for the Camden Society in 1838.
