= Jacopo Mazzoni =

Italian philosopher (1548–1598)

- Jacobus Mazzonius
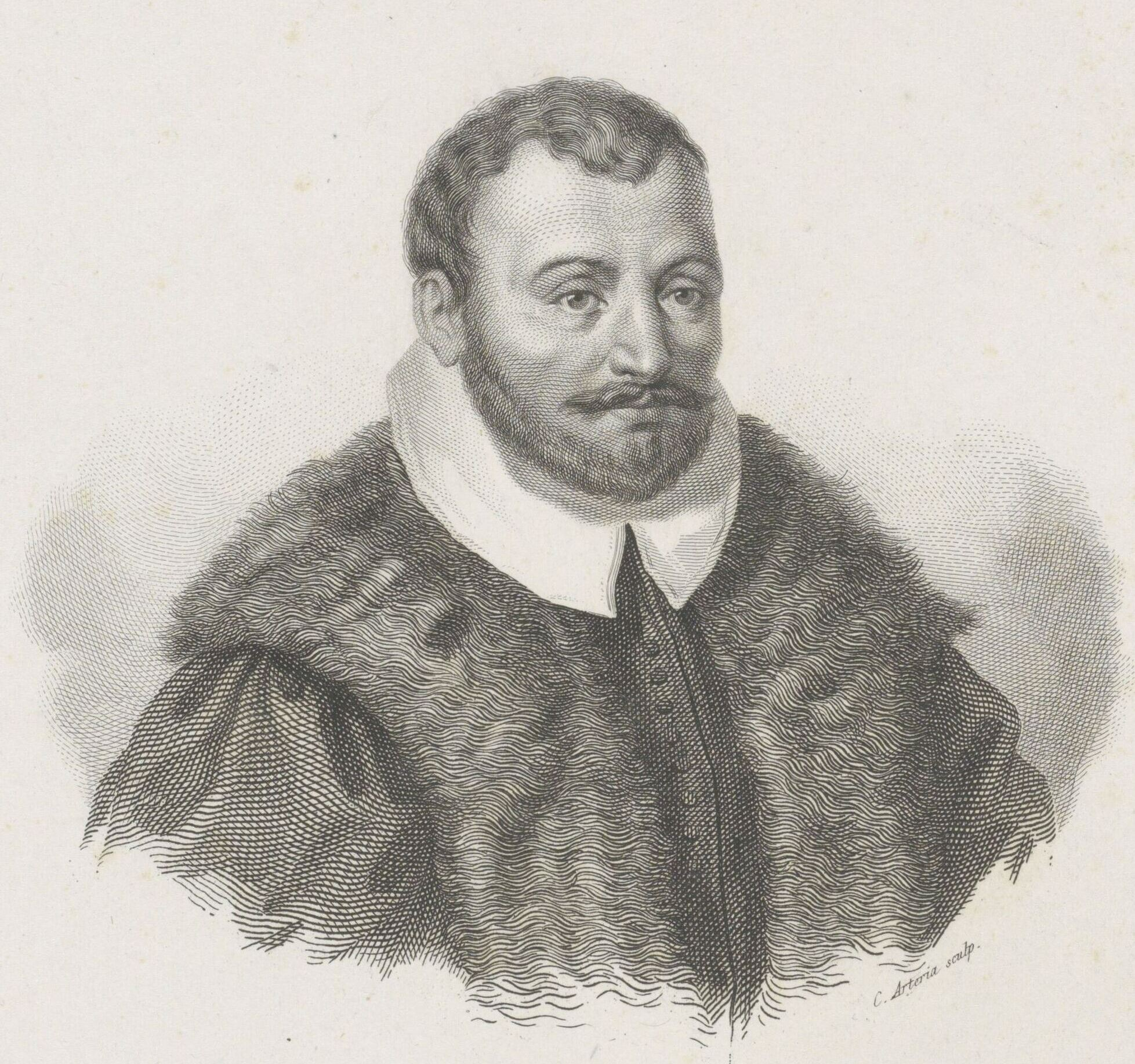
- Jacopo Mazzoni
- Born: 27 November 1548; Cesena, Papal States
- Died: 10 April 1598 (aged 49); Ferrara, Papal States

Education
- Education: University of Padua

Philosophical work
- Era: Renaissance philosophy
- Region: Western philosophy
- School: Aristotelianism; Platonism
- Institutions: Accademia della Crusca
- Main interests: Metaphysics, natural philosophy, literary criticism
- Notable ideas: Reconciliation of Platonism and Aristotelianism

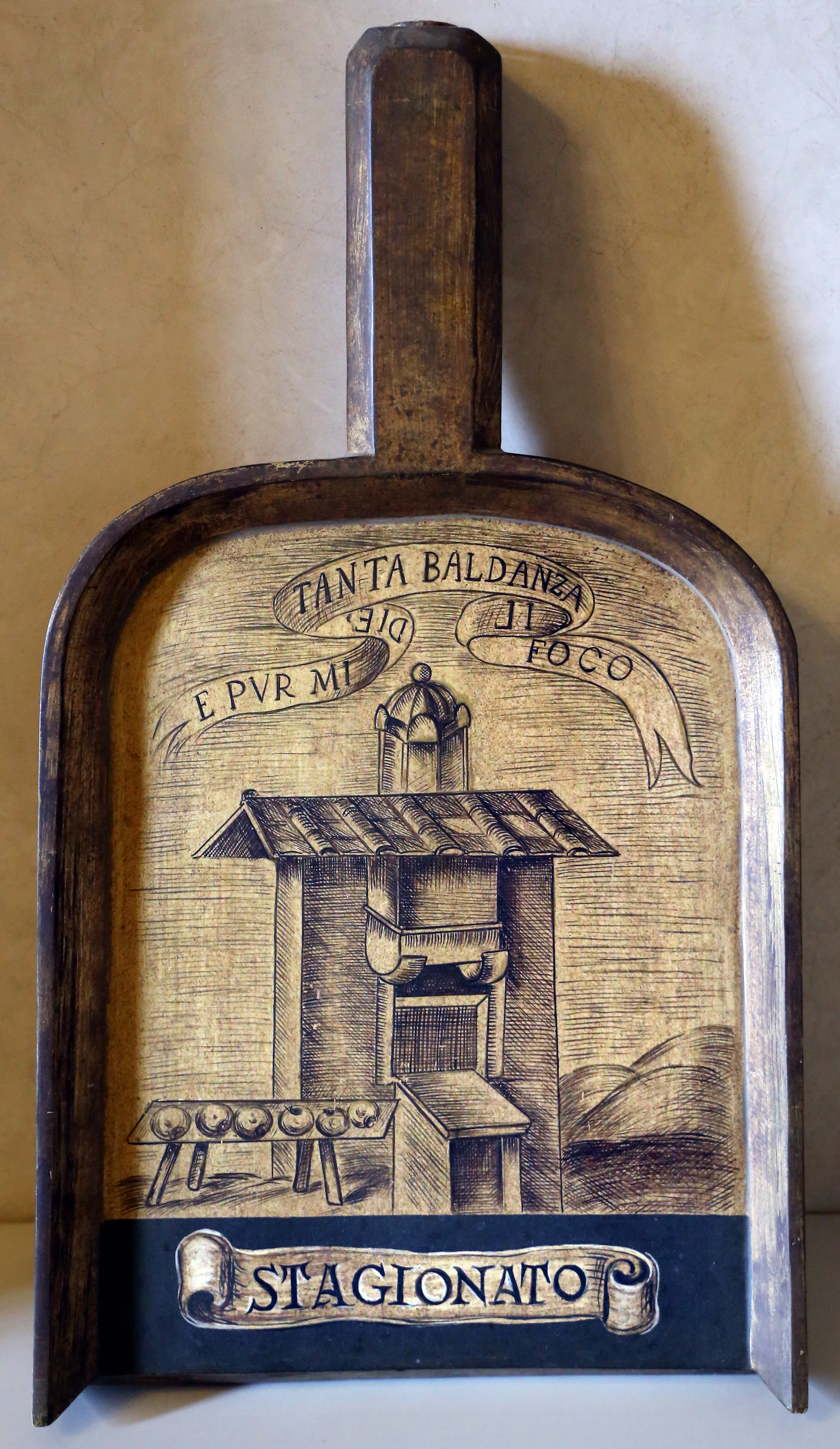
The shovel of Jacopo Mazzoni (Stagionato) at Accademia della Crusca

Jacopo Mazzoni (Latinized as Jacobus Mazzonius, 27 November 1548 – 10 April 1598) was an Italian philosopher, a professor in Pisa, and friend of Galileo Galilei. His first name is sometimes reported as Giacomo.

== Biography ==
Giacopo (Jacopo) Mazzoni was born in Cesena, the Papal States (modern day Italy) on 27 November 1548. Educated in Bologna in Hebrew, Greek, Latin, rhetoric, and poetics, Mazzoni later attended the University of Padua in 1563 where he studied philosophy and jurisprudence.

One of the most eminent savants of the period, Mazzoni was reported to have an excellent memory, which made him adept at recalling passages from Dante, Lucretius, Virgil, and others in his regular debates with prominent public figures. It also allowed him to excel at memory contests, which he routinely won. He is said to have defeated the Admirable Crichton three times in dialectic.

Later in life, Mazzoni would teach at universities in Rome, Paris, and Cesena, and was partly responsible for the establishment of the Della Crusca Academy.

He was an authority on ancient languages and philology, and gave a great impetus to the scientific study of the Italian language. Mazzoni died in Ferrara, Italy, in 1598.

== Major works ==
Though Mazzoni considered himself primarily a philosopher, his major work of philosophy – an attempt to reconcile the theories of Plato and Aristotle called De Triplici Hominum Vita, Activa Nempe, Contemplativa, et Religiosa Methodi Tres (On the Three Ways of Man's Life: the Active, the Contemplative, and the Religious, published in 1576) – is not widely read. Mazzoni is most known for his work on literary criticism, particularly his defenses of Dante's Divine Comedy, Discorso in Difesa Della Commedia Della Divino Poeta Dante (The Discourse in Defense of the Comedy of the Divine Poet Dante), published in 1572 and a second effort, Della Difesa Della Comedia Di Dante (On the Defense of the Comedy of Dante), which was not published until 1688.

Mazzoni was originally asked to write the defense by a noble friend who was distressed at criticism being leveled at the Divine Comedy by Ridolfo Castravilla. Mazzoni's initial volume on the subject (The Discourse in Defense...), which he claims was written in only 20 days, attracted criticism for its sometimes vague reasoning and its tendency, at times, to simply contradict, rather than refute, Dante's detractors.

In response to criticisms that contemporaries such as Belisario Bulgarini leveled against his first effort, Mazzoni wrote the more extensive and more sophisticated On the Defense of the Comedy of Dante. In this work, before directly addressing Dante's work, Mazzoni develops his theory of poetics, in which, drawing heavily from Plato and Aristotle, he discusses mimesis, the role of poetry, and the definition of poetry versus poetics (see Theory section, below). Though no complete English translation of Mazzoni's text exists, excerpts from the Introduction and Summary have appeared in some anthologies, as well as in a partial translation by Robert L. Montgomery.

== Theory ==
One of Mazzoni's more significant contributions to criticism is his discussion of mimesis in poetry. Mazzoni departs from his predecessors in that he conceives of poetic imitation not as the recreation of an actual object, but as the recreation of an ideal. This idea, which has been compared to Jean Baudrillard's simulacrum, Mazzoni calls the idol – a concept constructed by human artifice to which poetic imitations are compared in order to determine their believability. Mazzoni discusses believability or credibility, rather than truth – he defines poetry as a sophistic activity, the purpose of which is not to recreate truth, but rather to mimic that which will have the proper effect on the audience. As Mazzoni says, "if it should happen that two things should appear before the poet, one of them false but credible and the other true but incredible or at least not very credible, then the poet must leave the true and follow the credible."

Mazzoni resurrects the ancient tradition of linking poetry to rhetoric, which also has the credible, rather than the true, as its object. He also gives great importance to poetry's effect on the audience as a determinant of quality. Although he admits that much of the exercise of poetry involves attempting faithful imitation (albeit of human constructs or categories, not ones that are necessarily true), success in poetry for him is ultimately determined by persuasion, not truth and objectivity. For him, successful poetry is something that occurs in and of the audience, not outside and independent of it. For Mazzoni, even poetry is a meaningless category – it is our classifications that constitute criticism, not our ability to form a relationship with some reified thing called "The Poem".

Like Plato, Mazzoni was very concerned with determining the purpose of poetry. For him, its purpose is to "move the reader to pleasure and delight in the perception of the believable images." Essentially, for Mazzoni, the purpose of poetry is recreation and pleasure; however, he also attaches a concept he calls "civil faculty." In part, this has to do with the idea that taking a break from serious business (i.e., by creating or consuming poetry) allows one to return to that business afterwards with renewed enthusiasm. Mazzoni also says, however, that there is a distinct pleasure in poetry which, in addition to its ability to delight, carries with it a concealed lesson, moral, or other element that allows it to contribute to the improvement of society.

Mazzoni's work is characterized by his methodical attempts to draw distinctions between similar phenomena. In proceeding along this course, he makes some compelling definitions and distinctions, such as that between poetry and poetics, the former being concerned with the formation of poetry (considerations for rhyme or meter for example) and the latter with a poem's relationship to the "civil faculty."

The distinction between icastic and phantastic imitation, concepts borrowed from Plato, is also important in Mazzoni's work. Icastic imitation refers to the recreation of something based in reality – a simulation of a real person or the creation of a character based on a real person is icastic imitation. Phantastic imitation is the imitation of something completely the artist's imagination. This distinction would play an important role in Mazzoni's On the Defense of the Comedy of Dante, in which he would argue that the work, being allegorical and based in a divine vision, was icastic mimesis because it imitates something real. This was meant to counter arguments by writers such as Castravilla who dismissed Dante's work as lacking in verisimilitude and even claimed that the Comedy was not poetry at all, as it was simply the recounting of a vision. Under Mazzoni's definitions, these were not valid criticisms, as poetry was essentially mimesis made persuasive by the use of craft or art.

== Influences ==
Some of Mazzoni's influences are clear, such as Plato and Aristotle. Mazzoni regularly makes direct reference to their works and draws some of his ideas directly from theories that they established (such as Plato's icastic and phantastic imitation). The influence of other thinkers has also been identified in Mazzoni's work, including neo-platonists such as Proclus, and Greek sophists such as Dionysius of Halicarnassus and Aulus Gellius (the latter two particularly in Mazzoni's discussion on the impact of the character of the poet on the nature of the poem).

== Influence and criticism ==
Mazzoni influenced many theorists ranging from the Romantic era right up to the 21st century. In "emphasizing poetry's relationship to images and games," for example, Mazzoni informs romantic writers such as Samuel Taylor Coleridge and Friedrich von Schiller (Leitch, 301). His influence can also be seen in modern efforts to define the difference between poetic language and other types. Mazzoni has also been subject to criticism, for example, he has been called contradictory in trying to assign both pleasure and social utility to poetry at the same time, while others question his use of the distinction between icastic and phantastic mimesis (Leitch, 301).

== Works ==
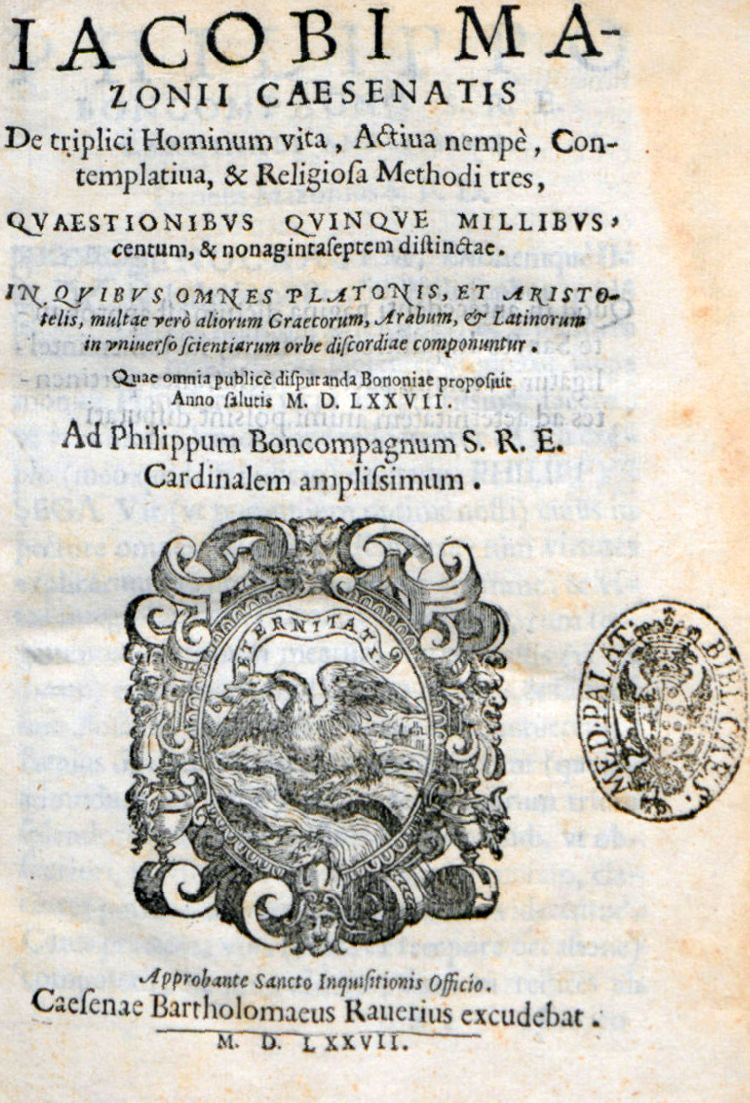
De triplici hominum vita, activa nempe, contemplativa, et religiosa methodi tres, 1577

- Mazzoni, Jacopo (1572). Discorso de' dittongi (in Italian). Cesena: Raverio.
- Mazzoni, Jacopo (1573). Discorso in difesa della Comedia del divino poeta contro il discorso di Ridolfo Castravilla (in Italian). Cesena: Raverio.
- De triplici hominum vita, activa nempe, contemplativa, et religiosa methodi tres (in Latin). Cesena: Raverio. 1577.
- Mazzoni, Jacopo (1587). Della difesa della Comedia di Dante. Distinta in sette libri (in Italian). Vol. 1. Cesena: Raverio.
- Mazzoni, Jacopo (1688). Della difesa della Comedia di Dante. Distinta in sette libri (in Italian). Vol. 2. Cesena: Verdoni.
- Mazzoni, Jacopo (1587). Discorso intorno alla Risposta e alle Opposizioni fattegli dal sig. Francesco Patricio, pertenente alla storia del poema Dafni, o Litiersa di Sositeo poeta della Pleiade (in Italian). Cesena: Raverio.
- Mazzoni, Jacopo (1587). Ragioni delle cose dette, e d'alcune autorità citate da Iacopo Mazzoni nel Discorso della storia del poema Dafni, o Litiersa di Sositeo (in Italian). Cesena: Raverio.
- Mazzoni, Jacopo (1597). In universam Platonis et Aristotelis philosophiam praeludia (in Latin). Venice: Guerigli.

== Works cited ==
- Adams, Hazard (1971). Critical Theory Since Plato. New York: Harcourt Brace Jovanovich, Inc.
- This article incorporates text from a publication now in the public domain: Chisholm, Hugh, ed. (1911). "Mazzoni, Giacomo". Encyclopædia Britannica. Vol. 17 (11th ed.). Cambridge University Press. p. 945.
- Gilbert, Allan H. (1962). Literary Criticism: Plato to Dryden. Detroit: Wayne State University Press.
- Hathway, Baxter (1968). Marvels and Commonplaces: Renaissance Literary Criticism. New York: Random House.
- Leitch, Vincent B. Ed. "From On the Defense of the Comedy of Dante." The Norton Anthology of Theory and Criticism. New York: W. W. Norton and Company, 2001. pp. 302–323.
- Leitch, Vincent B. Ed. "Giacopo Mazzoni." The Norton Anthology of Theory and Criticism. New York: W. W. Norton and Company, 2001. pp. 299–302.
- Mazzoni, Giacopo. On the Defense of the Comedy of Dante: Introduction and summary. Trans. Robert L. Montgomery. Tallahassee: University Presses of Florida, 1983.
- Weinberg, Bernard (1961). A History of Literary Criticism in the Italian Renaissance. Toronto: University of Toronto Press.
- Dalmas, Davide (2009). "Mazzoni, Jacopo". Dizionario Biografico degli Italiani (in Italian). Vol. 72: Massimo–Mechetti. Rome: Istituto dell'Enciclopedia Italiana. ISBN 978-88-12-00032-6.
- Heilbron, John (2010). Galileo. New York: Oxford University Press. ISBN 9780191625022.
