= John de Asgarby =

University chancellor

John de Asgarby was Chancellor of the University of Cambridge in 1267.

Little is known of his chancellorship. A surviving letter from archbishop Walter Giffard to the scholars of the University of Cambridge inquires as to the reasoning behind Asgarby's objection to the appointment of Adam de Northfouk as rector of Kirkby in Kendal. A further letter from Giffard in 1267 rebuked him for jealous speeches.

In 1272 the patent rolls detailed provision for his absence during a three-year visit to the Papal Court in Rome with the King's licence.
