= 1847 University of Cambridge Chancellor election =

1847 election of ceremonial head of British university

1847 Cambridge chancellery election
- 25–27 February 1847
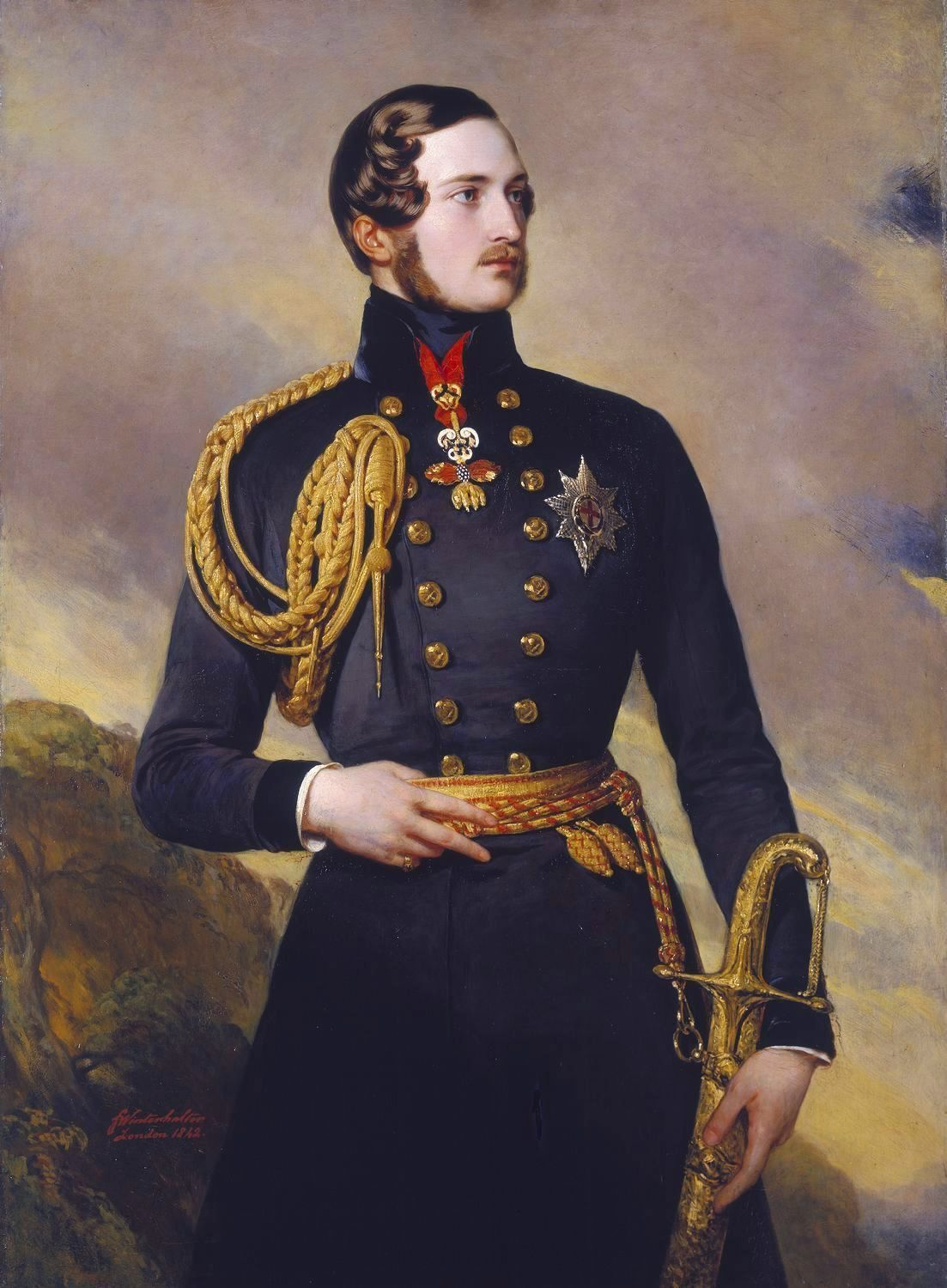

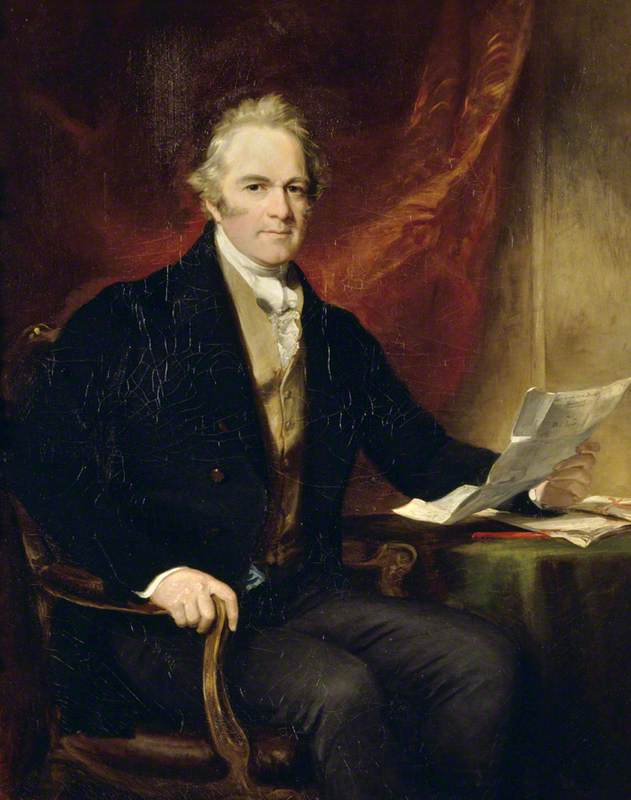
| Candidate | Prince Albert | Earl of Powis |
| Party | | Tory |
| Popular vote | 954 | 837 |
| Percentage | 53% | 47% |
Chancellor before election
Duke of Northumberland
Elected Chancellor
Prince Albert

An election for the Chancellorship of the University of Cambridge was held on 25–27 February 1847, after the death of the Duke of Northumberland. Many senior figures in the university hoped that Prince Albert could be persuaded to stand and be elected unopposed, but a group from St John's College approached the Earl of Powis, a St John's man. The election became politicised as Powis was a noted Conservative and his opponents feared the consequences from the Whig Government if he was elected. The result was close as the large number of non-resident Members of the Senate from St John's, and Conservative supporters, backed Powis, but the Prince (who was reluctant to enter into a political contest) was elected and agreed to take up the post. The election occurred at a critical point in the history of the University when it was pressed to reform, and Prince Albert's election allowed progress to be made.

== Vacancy arises ==
News of the death of the Duke of Northumberland, who had been Chancellor of the University since 1840, was received in Cambridge on the evening of Friday 12 February. Initial thoughts of his successor centred on Lord Lyndhurst who was then High Steward of the University and a member of Trinity College, the largest. A letter in the London evening newspaper The Globe suggested the Earl of Burlington. Others were already suggesting that Prince Albert might be a suitable candidate. The Prince was an obvious choice as he was known to be interested in higher education, intelligent and had a serious approach. He had been made a Doctor of Laws and a member of Trinity College when he visited Cambridge together with the Queen in 1843, but there were some difficulties which his election would bring. He was not English, and did not know much about English universities; also had no seat in Parliament and was therefore unable to defend Cambridge there. As a member of the Royal Family, the Prince was above party politics: this had advantages (putting the University out of the party fray) but also disadvantages (he was unable to intervene in intense political debates).

Among the senior members of the University who thought of Prince Albert was William Whewell, then Master of Trinity College. On 13 February Whewell wrote to the Treasurer of Prince Albert's Household to ask if the Prince would consent to nomination; later that day he visited him in person to discuss the issue. Albert was unprepared for the invitation and asked Baron Stockmar about it; Stockmar advised that the Prince's experience of German universities might be of some use. At Stockmar's suggestion, he consulted the Marquess of Lansdowne, Lord President of the Council, who advised him to accept provided that the election was unopposed. The Prince accepted this advice and on Sunday 14 February Lord Monteagle of Brandon wrote to Whewell confirming the Prince's conditional acceptance of nomination. Whewell was quite pleased to have received it, never expecting to get an unconditional acceptance, and returned to Cambridge to begin arranging what he hoped would be the unopposed election.

== A contest looms ==
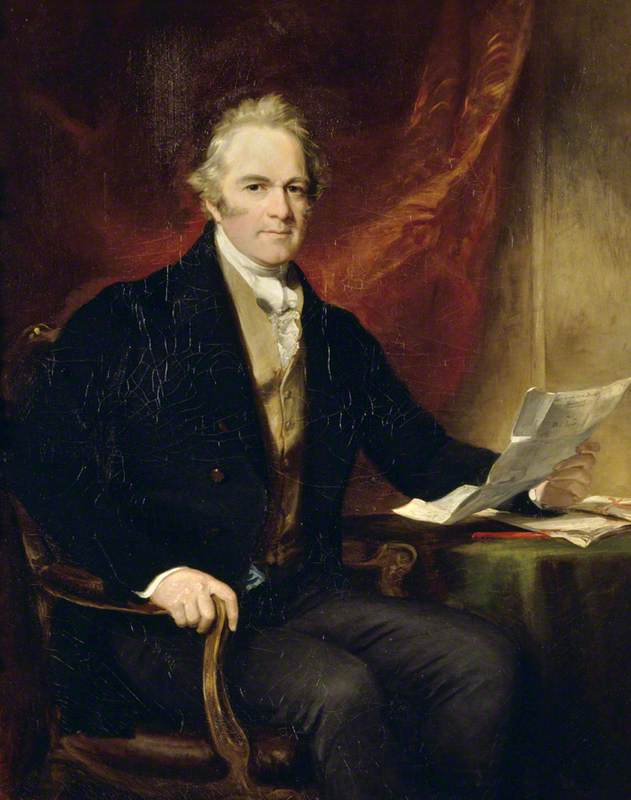
Edward Herbert, 2nd Earl of Powis in 1845, by Francis Grant. Powys Castle, Welshpool.

Immediately on learning of the death of the Duke of Northumberland, the Master and senior members of St John's College had decided to invite the Earl of Powis, who had studied at that college, to be a candidate. Powis was English and had been Tory Member of Parliament for Ludlow for 33 years, voting against the Reform Act. He was mainly known for his religious views, being a Tractarian, and had led the opposition in the House of Lords to the proposal to unite the sees of Bangor and St Asaph in order to create a new Bishopric of Manchester. The fight had begun in 1843 and had led to the appointment of a Commission to reconsider the measure, which recommended that it be dropped. As a result, Powis was popular among churchmen.

On his return to Cambridge, Whewell had found that almost all the Heads of Colleges and Professors were supportive of the Prince, and two (Woodwardian Professor of Geology Adam Sedgwick and the Master of Jesus College William French) had had the same idea and were already canvassing support. The appearance of a rival candidate might undermine the whole effort since the Prince wanted an unopposed election. Powis had received the invitation from his college at home in Shropshire and accepted it on Monday 15 February, probably in ignorance of any approach to Prince Albert, and the supporters of the Prince hoped that Powis might be persuaded to withdraw on learning of widespread support for a rival. The Vice-Chancellor Henry Philpott and 13 Heads of Colleges agreed the terms of a formal address to the Prince asking for permission to nominate him and left it at Catharine Hall where Philpott was Master, for others to sign. The address read:

May it please your Royal Highness,—
The office of Chancellor of the University of Cambridge having become vacant by the lamented death of his Grace the Duke of Northumberland, we, the undersigned, members of the Senate of the University, beg leave most respectfully to prefer our request to your Royal Highness, that you will graciously permit your Royal Highness's name to be proposed to the Senate for election into the vacant office, according to the prescribed forms of our academical constitution.

== Withdrawals and acceptances both declined ==
On learning that Powis had accepted, the Master of St John's immediately wrote back to tell him that Prince Albert might be a candidate. However, news of Powis' acceptance of nomination had already been published in the London evening newspapers of Monday. While Powis knew it would be unseemly to fight an election against the Prince, he felt he could not go back on his word and disappoint his supporters. The Vice-Chancellor apparently appealed to Powis directly to urge him to withdraw, but it was in vain. Powis confirmed that he would stand; committees were already being formed to support him which were pleased to hear of his determination, and the committees resolved to "use the utmost efforts" to campaign. He quickly gathered support in London; the members of the Oxford and Cambridge Club were said to be almost universally in favour of Powis, although after the election was over, a pamphleteer generally sympathetic to him regretted that his supporters had resorted to "degrading" public advertisement to drum up support. Most of the press were also opposed to the Prince, with Punch being particularly energetic in the campaign: it printed a spoof begging-letter from the University to the Prince which ran:

As standing nearest to the Crown, your Royal Highness will of course be the most impartial mediator between the Crown and the University, which, we assure your Royal Highness, will be found at all times submissive to the will of the Sovereign. Your Royal Highness, not possessing a seat in the legislative body, will be spared the fatigue of protecting University interests in Parliament; while, not having been educated at this University, your Royal Highness will be free from all bias or prepossession as to measures affecting its interests. We almost venture to regret that the attainments and character of your Royal Highness are such as in themselves perhaps to justify this application. But we are proud to assure your Royal Highness that, had your Royal Highness been as ignorant as you are learned, as rude as you are cultivated in good arts, as violent as you are gentle, as over-bearing as you are modest, we should still have shown our loyalty and respect for dignities, by laying this office at the feet of your Royal Highness.

The Prince's supporters could not send their address until Powis' intentions were known, so it waited at Catharine Hall until Friday 19 February when they met at Trinity College. Whewell presided and those present included most Heads of Colleges, Professors and resident Fellows. This meeting unanimously approved Prince Albert as a candidate and appointed a Committee to run his election campaign which contained Fellows from every college except St John's. It was agreed that the Vice-Chancellor should go to meet the Prince to present the address and hear his reply about whether, in the circumstances of a contested election, the Prince would accept nomination. Because the issue was critical, the Vice-Chancellor was to telegraph the Prince's decision: "A" for acceptance, "C" for conditional acceptance, and "R" for refusal.

On Saturday 20 February the Vice-Chancellor went by train to London and had an audience with Prince Albert at Buckingham Palace, handing him the address with its many distinguished signatures. The Prince had prepared a written answer which stated that "from the proceedings entered into by others in the University, .. there does not exist that degree of unanimity which alone would leave me at liberty to consent to be put in nomination". The Queen wrote in her diary for that night that Albert had declined the offer and Philpott telegraphed back "R", a reply which was received during the afternoon. The full text of the Prince's letter was telegraphed shortly before Philpott arrived back and a full committee meeting was called. John Graham, the Master of Christ's College, told the meeting that he had private information that the answer was final and it would be disrespectful to the Prince to proceed.

== The Contest becomes certain ==
The supporters of Prince Albert at the meeting on Saturday evening were very reluctant to give up, many thinking that the choice of Powis would be a disastrous insult to the Government. The meeting concluded by carrying a resolution to meet again on Monday, although most expected this next meeting would have to wind up the campaign. However, late in the evening, James Cartmell (a Fellow of Christ's College) arrived from London bearing a letter from Lord Monteagle to Whewell. Monteagle had been working to support the Prince and wrote that " 'R' was sent by mistake. The answer is no refusal" and citing three others "best qualified to form an opinion" as agreeing. Lord Lansdowne, who possibly drafted the Prince's reply, was certainly one of them, and explained that the Prince had refused his consent to be nominated, but had not said that he would refuse office if his supporters nominated him anyway. He was therefore giving his Cambridge supporters a free hand. Accordingly when the Committee met on Monday 22 February, they unanimously agreed to nominate the Prince and to distribute a circular in his favour. Notwithstanding what he had said on Saturday, Graham did not dissent. A Committee was formed at the Union Hotel in London to campaign for the non-resident vote, under the chairmanship of the Marquess of Northampton.

On learning he had in fact been nominated, the Prince asked former Prime Minister Sir Robert Peel for advice on whether he should insist on withdrawing, or remain indifferent, and whether in the event of his election, he should refuse or accept. Peel advised him to let the election take its course and to accept the office, "for of the result of the contest I cannot have a doubt". The Prince accepted this advice.

== Issues ==
Cambridge in the 1840s was under severe pressure to reform, being still almost entirely Anglican. The Chancellor election was crucial to the University's response. While some feared that Prince Albert would seek to change Cambridge to be like a German university, others believed he would be easily accepted by the Government as a clear indication that Cambridge supported reforms and would bring them forward. However, this argument was not easily made in public and the main themes in the election were not so high-minded. Powis was attacked as a Roman Catholic masquerading as an Anglican, while the feud between Trinity and St John's Colleges was stirred up on both sides. On 23 February Whewell wrote a general letter asking for support for the Prince because Powis would be "a Chancellor of St John's" and had estranged himself from the rest of the University. Whewell hand-wrote some letters but lithographed others, and the Master of St Johns Ralph Tatham complained that for him to do so was "unjust and unprecedented" since the assertion was wrong: Powis' committee contained 40 Trinity graduates. Whewell stood by his comments, on the grounds that Powis had not told the officers of the University that he was standing, and had replied with the resolution of a committee when they had got in touch with him.

Some Royalists appealed for votes for "the noble-hearted husband of our noble-hearted Queen", while others refused to have a non-English and non-Cambridge man as Chancellor. The Times printed a letter "written in a ruder style than we could have wished" which objected that it was improper for the University to have direct access to the Crown through the husband of the Queen. Party political considerations were also present. An anonymous "non-resident M.A." published in the London newspapers complained that on Albert's committee, "scarcely a name is to be found but that of some mere Whig politician, or some courtier who is no politician at all"; the author praised Powis as the "best bulwark [of the Church] in our days" and lamented that the Whigs were fighting under cover of the Queen's consort and against his wishes. The Globe contended that the Prince was precluded from accepting the office for several reasons, but for "one all-sufficient fact—the absence of anything approaching to unanimity in the University". The Evening Standard felt that nominating Albert was disrespectful to both Queen Victoria and the Prince himself, and that voting against Albert was justified because he had refused to be nominated.

== Casting votes ==
The electorate for the election of Chancellor was the Senate of the University, consisting of all the senior members including the Masters of Arts. As Cambridge raised every graduate to the degree of a Master of Arts six years after matriculation, almost all Cambridge graduates (wherever resident) could vote. The total electorate was estimated by William Frederick Pollock, a Trinity College graduate supporting Powis, at 3,500, of whom 300 were resident in Cambridge. Votes had to be cast in person, and The Times printed the times of trains to Cambridge and back, so that non-resident MAs could go up and vote. Prince Albert was surprised to learn that Powis' London committee had chartered special trains for their supporters; this was a tactic which the Prince's supporters had not thought of. Cambridge graduates in high public office were strongly encouraged to take time off to go up and vote; they were also aware that voting was public and that, depending on their vote, they might incur grave Royal displeasure. The poll was set to be taken over three days. It would open at 10 am on Thursday 25 February, and close at 5 pm that night, and be reopened between 8 pm and 9 pm that evening. The poll on Friday 26 February, the second day, was held at the same hours as the first day; on Saturday 27 February the poll opened at 9 am and closed, finally, at noon. Votes were cast in a large voting chest on a table in front of the Vice-Chancellor, with two letter-boxes: the one to the right of the Vice-Chancellor was "The Prince Albert" while to the left was "The Earl of Powis". Voters would identify themselves and pick up one of two voting papers reading:

| e Collegio eligit CELSISSIMUM PRINCIPEM; ALBERTUM; IN CANCELLARIUM; HUJUS ACADEMIÆ | e Collegio eligit HONORATISSIMUM VIRUM; COMITEM DE POWIS; IN CANCELLARIUM; HUJUS ACADEMIÆ |

Each candidate had two "assessors" who checked the procedure was fair. The assessors for Prince Albert were the Rev Robert Birkett (Emmanuel College) and the Rev John Mills (Pembroke College); for the Earl of Powis, the assessors were John Charles Snowball (St John's College) and the Rev Henry Wilkinson Cookson (Peterhouse). During the voting the undergraduates (who had no votes) crowded into the galleries in the Senate House, shouting at the participants below. They returned on the second day's polling, Friday 26 February, bringing horns and throwing things down including peas, shot and halfpennies. It was noted that the Queen was respected, but that Albert called "The German Chancellor" as opposed to Powis as "The English Chancellor". However, others distinguished between "The Chancellor of St John's" and "The Royal Chancellor". One wag shouted a mock advertisement "shortly to be published: The Master of Trinity's Court Guide", followed by "Hints on Etiquette, by a Johnian". The Times reported the state of the poll at various hours to be as follows:

| First day | | | | Second day | | | | Third day | | | |
| Time | Prince Albert | Earl of Powis | Majority | Time | Prince Albert | Earl of Powis | Majority | Time | Prince Albert | Earl of Powis | Majority |
| | | | | | | | | 9:30 am | 896 | 793 | +103 |
| | | | | | | | | 10 am | 901 | 804 | +97 |
| 10:30 am | 52 | 68 | –16 | 10:30 am | 638 | 613 | +25 | 10:30 am | 912 | 805 | +107 |
| 11 am | 93 | 123 | –30 | 11 am | 654 | 632 | +22 | 11 am | 942 | 835 | +107 |
| 11:30 am | 133 | 187 | –54 | 11:30 am | 664 | 647 | +17 | 11:30 am | 948 | 839 | +109 |
| 12 pm | 148 | 214 | –66 | 12 pm | 668 | 654 | +14 | | | | |
| 12:30 pm | 219 | 301 | –82 | 12:30 pm | 670 | 660 | +10 | | | | |
| 1 pm | 292 | 353 | –61 | 1 pm | 706 | 679 | +27 | | | | |
| 1:30 pm | 312 | 368 | –56 | 1:30 pm | 718 | 683 | +35 | | | | |
| 2 pm | 328 | 393 | –65 | 2 pm | 724 | 689 | +39 | | | | |
| | | | | 2:30 pm | 761 | 706 | +55 | | | | |
| 3 pm | 427 | 451 | –24 | 3 pm | 781 | 722 | +59 | | | | |
| | | | | 3:30 pm | 792 | 736 | +56 | | | | |
| 4 pm | 533 | 543 | –10 | 4 pm | 808 | 749 | +59 | | | | |
| 4:30 pm | 560 | 560 | nil | 4:30 pm | 815 | 762 | +63 | | | | |
| 5 pm | 582 | 572 | +10 | 5 pm | 828 | 763 | +65 | | | | |
| 9 pm | 617 | 602 | +15 | 9 pm | 875 | 789 | +86 | | | | |

By Friday it had become clear to the Prince that, if he won, it would be by a small majority. He asked Sir Robert Peel to come to Buckingham Palace at 1 pm on Saturday, so that he could give advice on what to do when the expected delegation arrived from Cambridge formally offering him the Chancellorship. At noon on Saturday the voting ceased and the chest in which votes had been cast was opened so that they could be counted. Four dubious votes which had been kept back for consideration were found to be good votes by the Registrar, while four votes were struck off as the voter was found to be ineligible; two who met this fate were the Earl Fitzwilliam and Francis Hodgson, Provost of Eton, each of whom had graduated but not taken his MA. The names of all voters were read over again and the final result was declared just before 2 pm:

| College | Voters | Prince Albert | Earl of Powis | Majority | Paired (Albert) | Paired (Powis) |
|---|---|---|---|---|---|---|
| Catharine Hall | 45 | 22 | 23 | –1 | | 1 |
| Christ's College | 77 | 47 | 30 | +17 | 3 | 2 |
| Clare Hall | 56 | 37 | 19 | +18 | 2 | 2 |
| Corpus Christi College | 69 | 52 | 17 | +35 | 1 | |
| Downing College | 17 | 11 | 6 | +5 | 1 | |
| Emmanuel College | 72 | 32 | 40 | –8 | | 1 |
| Gonville and Caius College | 84 | 60 | 24 | +36 | 1 | |
| Jesus College | 59 | 33 | 26 | +7 | 1 | 2 |
| King's College | 56 | 31 | 25 | +6 | | 2 |
| Magdalene College | 62 | 38 | 24 | +14 | | |
| Pembroke Hall | 45 | 32 | 13 | +19 | | |
| Peterhouse | 64 | 33 | 31 | +2 | | 1 |
| Queens' College | 76 | 54 | 22 | +32 | | |
| St John's College | 371 | 53 | 318 | –265 | 4 | 6 |
| Sidney Sussex College | 29 | 21 | 8 | +13 | | 2 |
| Trinity College | 580 | 378 | 202 | +176 | 17 | 11 |
| Trinity Hall | 29 | 20 | 9 | +11 | | |
| Total | 1,791 | 954 | 837 | +117 | 30 | 30 |

== The Prince accepts ==
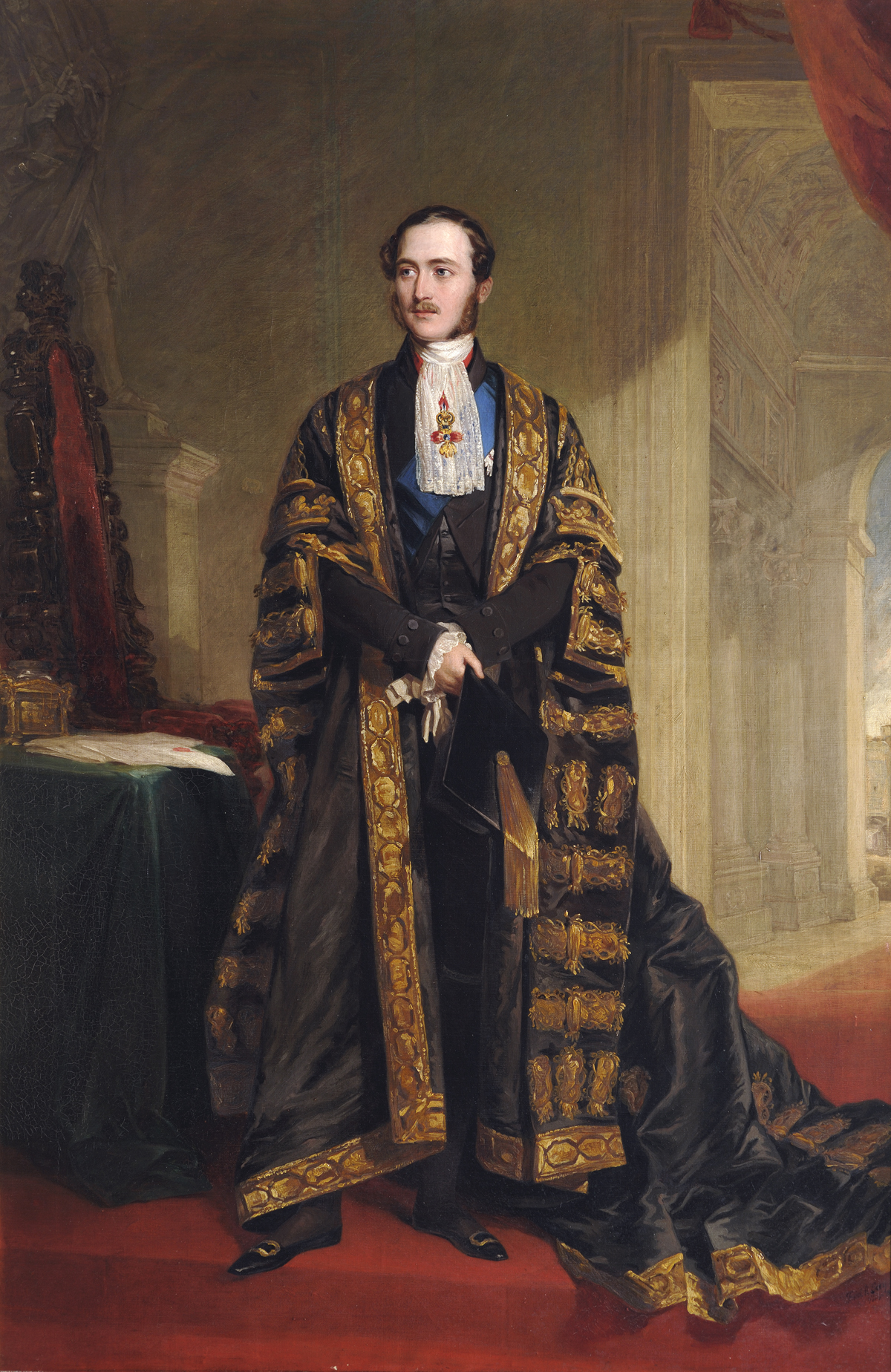
Prince Albert c. 1849, enrobed as Chancellor of the University, by Frederick Richard Say. Trinity College, Cambridge.

Having received the Prince's invitation, Peel prepared a paper for him giving his advice about what to do in the case of various election outcomes. Peel argued very strongly that, if the Prince was elected by a small majority, he should definitely accept the office: the small majority was the product of the unusual circumstances of the election, while most of the senior members of the University had supported him and to refuse the office would be to deeply offend them. He also drafted the terms of a reply which the Prince might make to the Cambridge delegation. The Prime Minister, Lord John Russell, also wrote to the Prince advising him that everyone he had seen thought "a refusal on the part of Your Royal Highness would create confusion and dissatisfaction". Queen Victoria wrote in her diary that "We are much gratified" by the result and that "Albert on the good advice of Sir Robert Peel (which is always valuable) is accepting the post".

When no delegation came on Saturday, and instead only a letter confirming the result and that an official letter of invitation would follow, the Prince's Private Secretary Colonel Phipps wrote to the Vice-Chancellor gently to encourage him to send a formal delegation. He also included the reply drafted by Peel which stated "I have resolved to accept the trust which the University is willing to confide to me". The official letter was traditionally in Latin and had to be approved by the Senate; the Rev Thomas Crick, the Public Orator, who wrote it, was a strong supporter of Powis and found it difficult to compose something friendly. When finished on 2 March it was sealed and taken to Buckingham Palace to be presented to the Prince who simply replied "and here is my answer". After the delegation had gone, Albert read the official letter and noticed that a minor mistake had been made in the Latin.

The Prince was formally installed as Chancellor of the University of Cambridge in a ceremony at Buckingham Palace on 25 March 1847. He invited Powis to the ceremony, but Powis replied that as the preceding day had been announced by the Queen as a "day of Prayer & Humiliation", he would be spending the time with his family instead.

== See also ==
- List of chancellors of the University of Cambridge
