= List of navigation authorities in the United Kingdom =

This List of navigation authorities in the United Kingdom is a list of links to any navigation authority in the United Kingdom, relating to any navigable waterway, aqueduct, canal, navigation, river or port.

These include:

- narrow canals, broad canals, or ship canals
- rivers which have been made navigable
- the Broads
- the navigable drains of The Fens.

== Examples of navigation authorities ==
=== The "Big Three" ===
- Canal & River Trust – charity replacing British Waterways in managing the majority of the canals and many navigable rivers
- Environment Agency – environmental regulatory body, manages its waterways as part of its water management obligations.
- Broads Authority – has status similar to other British national parks but alone amongst them also exercises a navigation function. The "Sandford Principle" as applied in other national parks does not apply here.

=== Other authorities ===
- Local authorities
- National park authorities
- Trusts

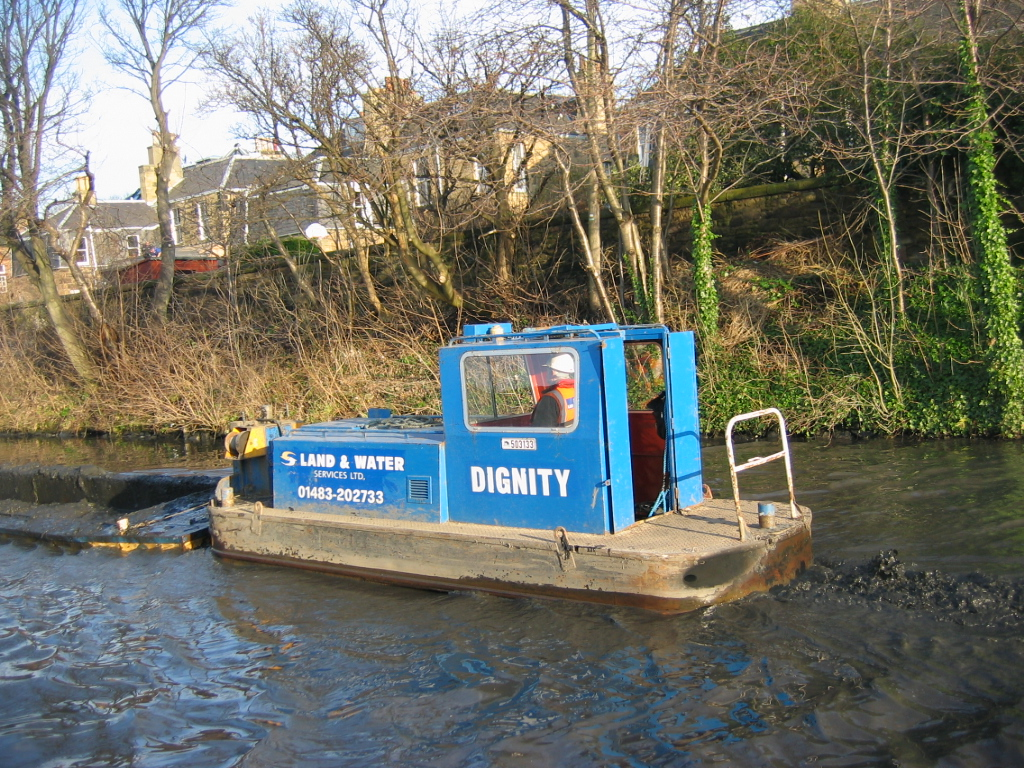
Dredging the Union Canal, Edinburgh

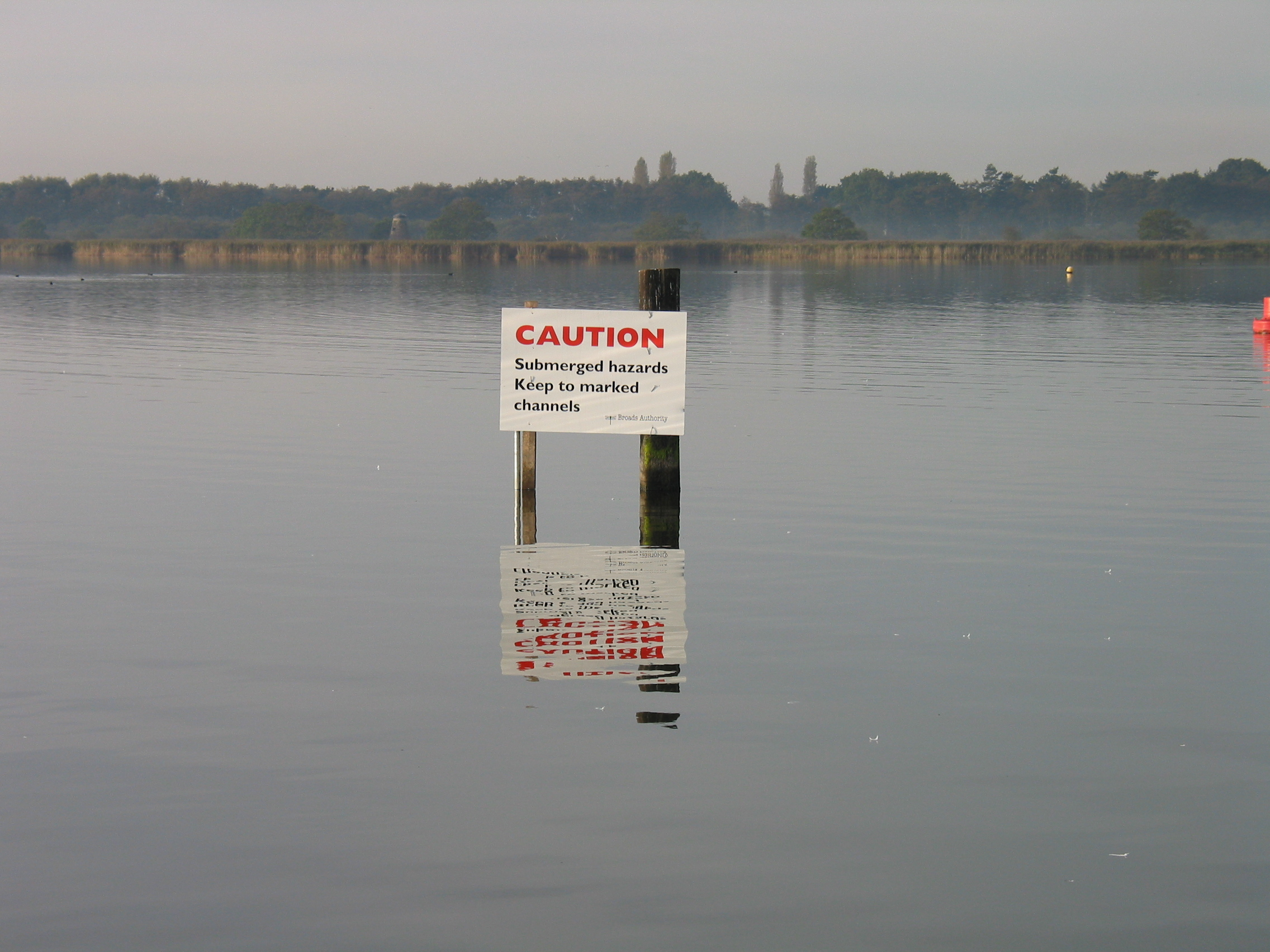
Hickling Broad, Norfolk Broads

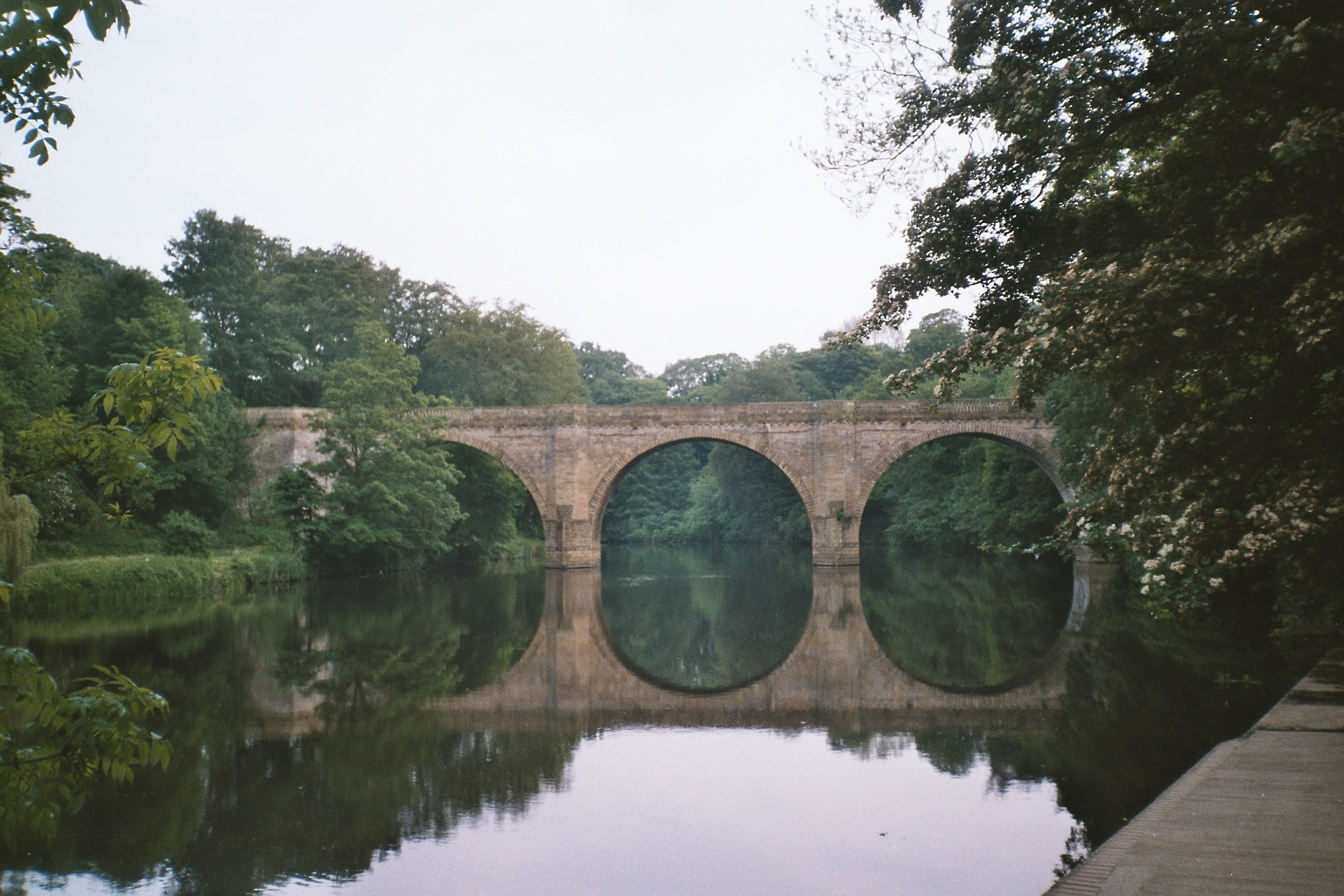
Prebends Bridge, River Wear, Durham

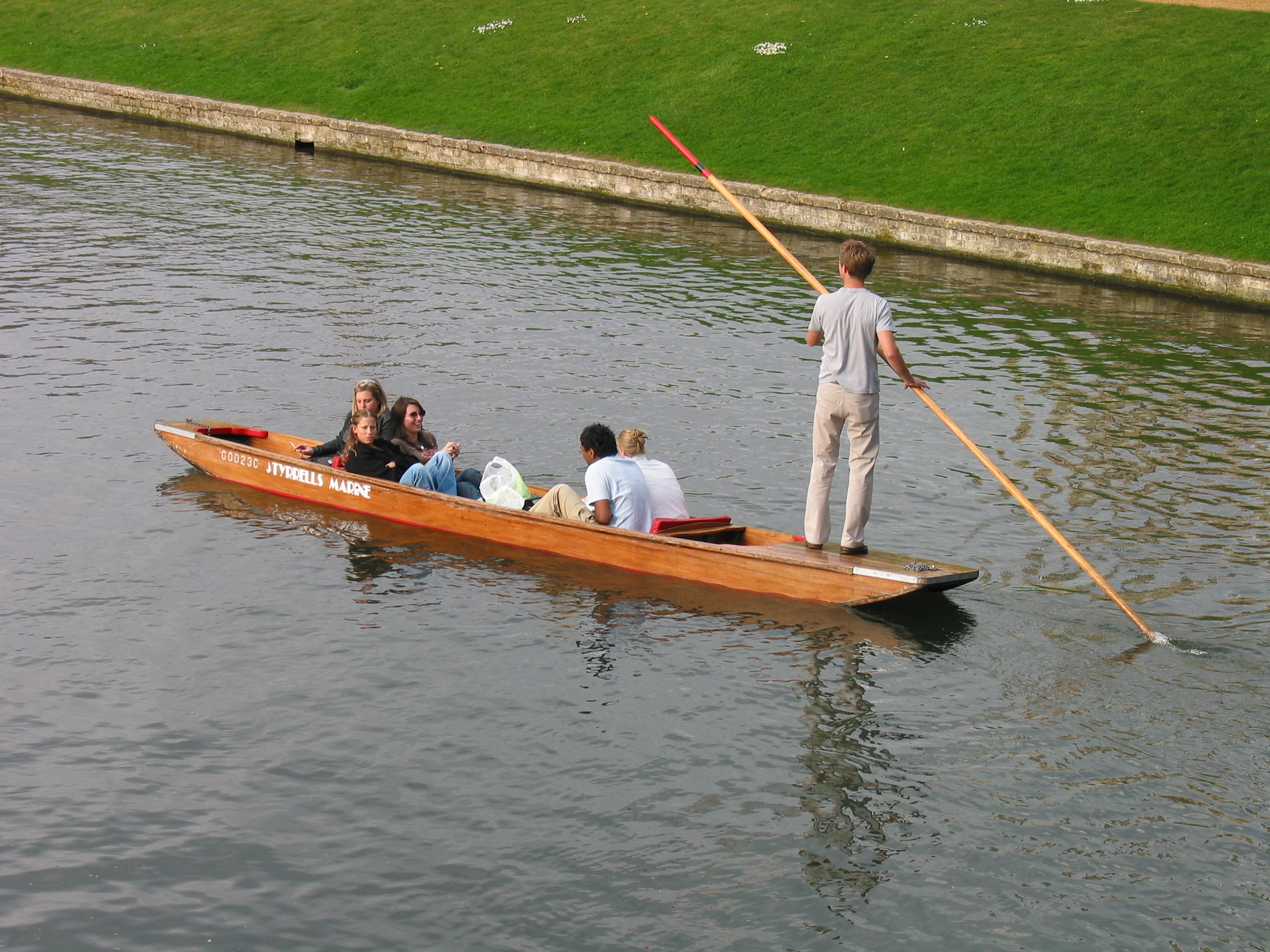
Punting on the Cam, Cambridge

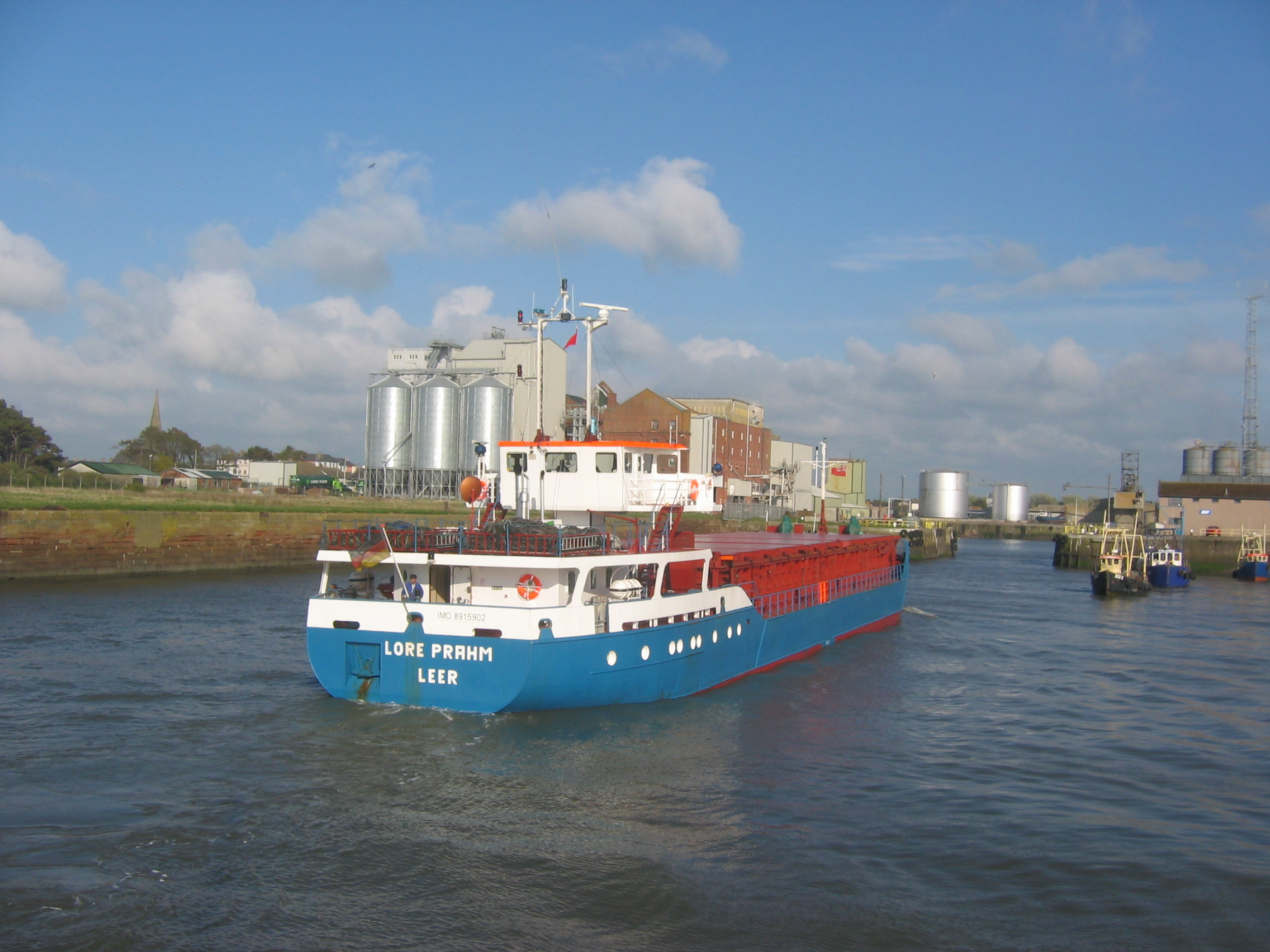
"Lore Prahm" entering Silloth Port, Solway Firth

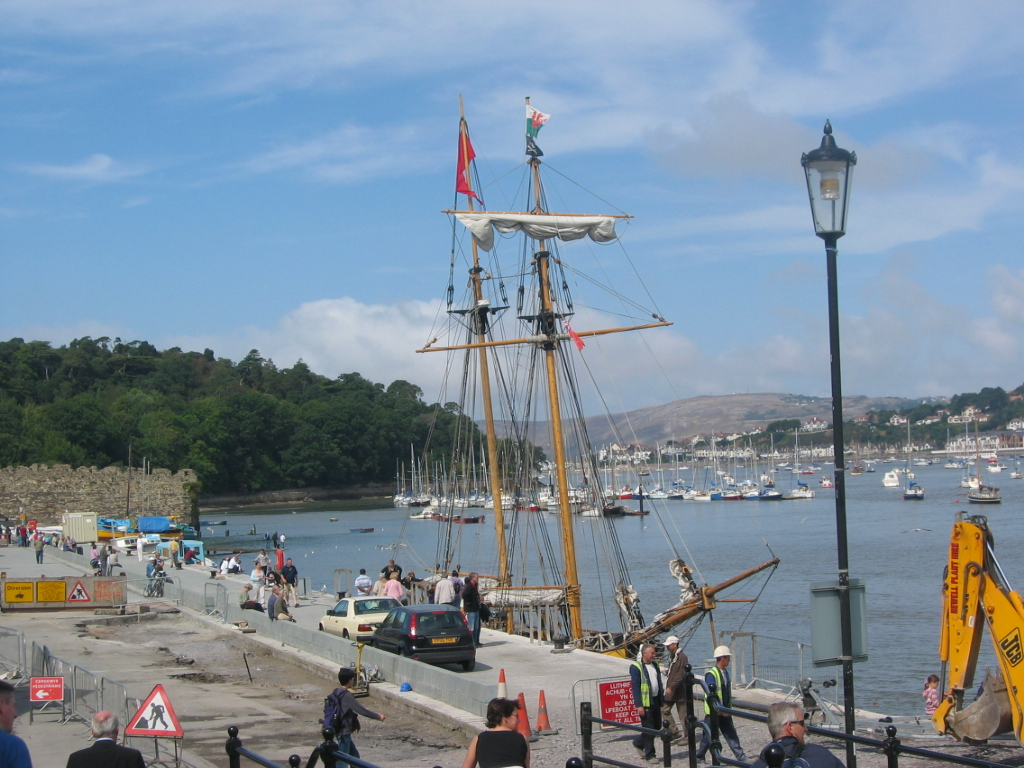
River Conwy estuary, North Wales

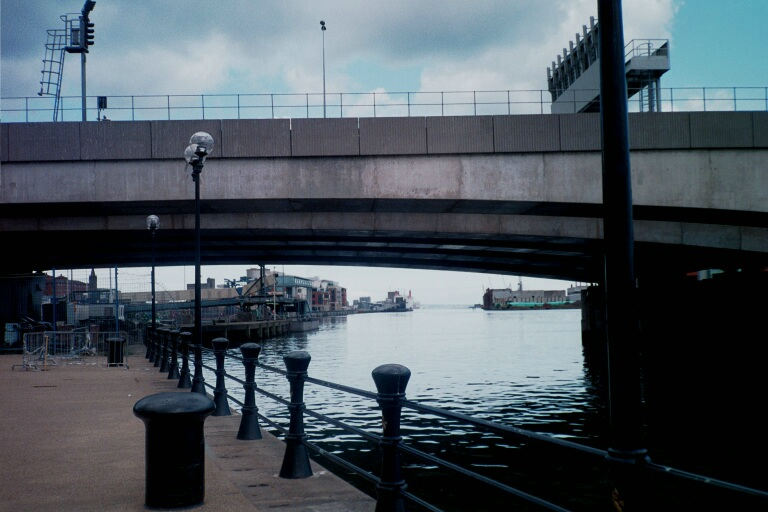
River Lagan, Belfast, Northern Ireland

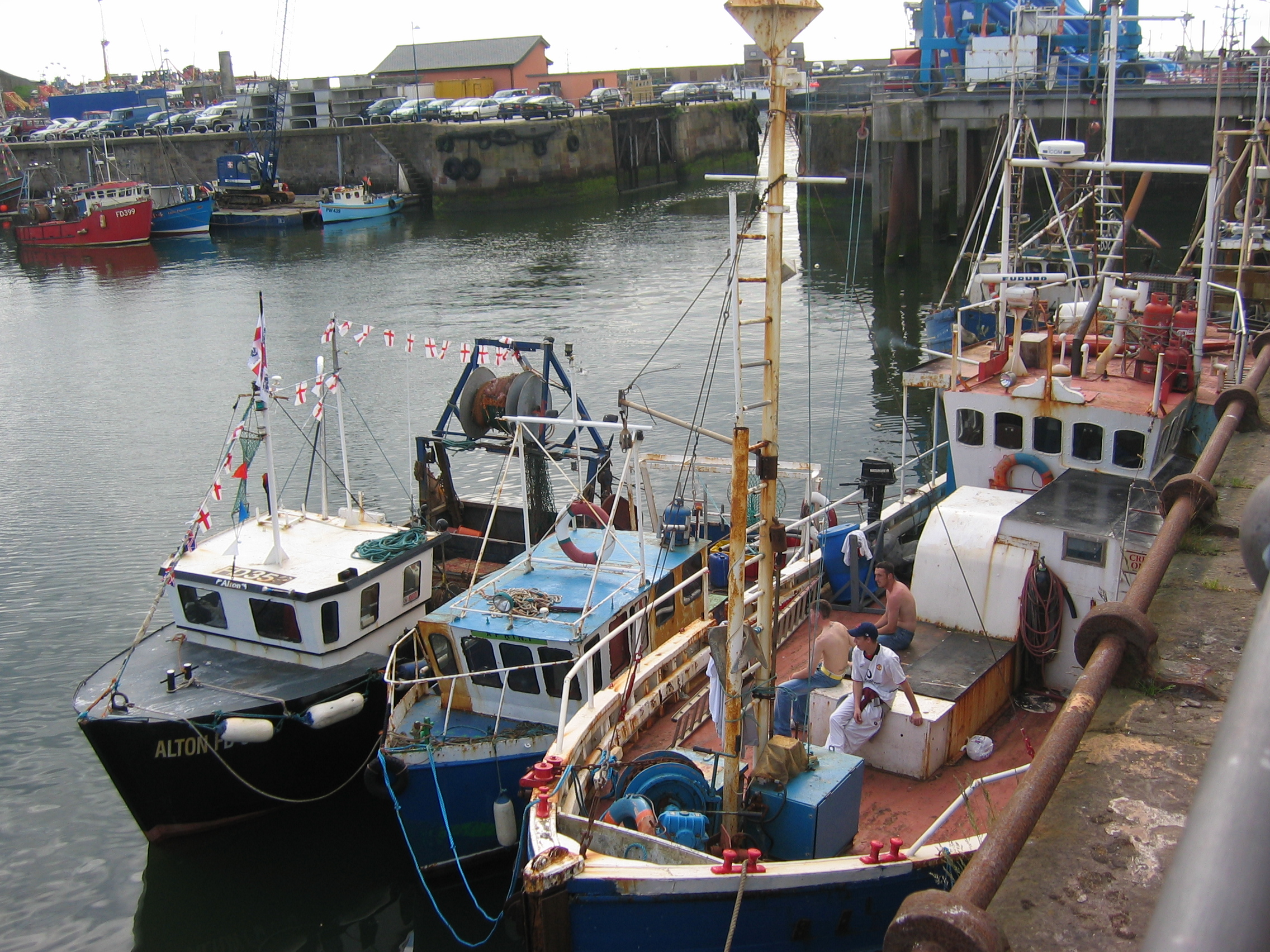
Commercial Port, Whitehaven, Solway Firth

== Navigation authorities in the UK ==
- Associated British Ports - ABP Humber
- Avon Navigation Trust (Stratford-on-Avon to Tewkesbury)
- Basingstoke Canal Authority
- Beaulieu River
- Bridgewater Canal - Manchester Ship Canal Company in conjunction with the Bridgewater Canal Trust
- Bristol Harbour Authority
- The Canal & River Trust, formerly British Waterways - supported by grant-in-aid from Government
- Broads Authority - a national park authority
- Cambridgeshire Lodes
- Cardiff Harbour Authority
- Chesterfield Canal Partnership
- City of York Council
- Company of Proprietors of the Chelmer and Blackwater Navigation
- Company of Proprietors of the Neath Canal Navigation
- Company of Proprietors of the Stroudwater Navigation
- Conservators of the River Cam
- Dart Harbour and Navigation Authority - a Trust Port, Dartmouth
- Devon County Council
- Driffield Navigation Trust
- Droitwich Canals Trust
- Environment Agency - supported by grant-in-aid from Government
- Essex Waterways Ltd - a subsidiary of the Inland Waterways Association
- Exe Estuary Navigation Authority based at Exeter
- Exeter City Council
- Gloucester Harbour Trustees - a Trust Port
- Herefordshire & Gloucestershire Canal Trust
- Hull City Council
- Inland Waterways Association subsidiary Essex Waterways Ltd
- Ipswich & Stowmarket Navigation - River Gipping Trust
- River Ivel - Environment Agency and riparian landowners
- Lake District National Park Authority
- Lancaster Canal's Northern Reaches - various ownerships
- Lapal Canal - various ownerships
- Little Ouse Navigation - Environment Agency / riparian landowners
- Loch Lomond and the Trossachs National Park Authority
- Manchester Ship Canal Company - the majority of shares are owned by Peel Ports, a subsidiary of The Peel Group.
- Medway Ports
- Middle Level Commissioners
- Neath Canal Navigation, Neath Port Talbot County Borough Council
- Port of Hull and the River Hull, Associated British Ports
- Port of London Authority
- River Dee, Wales - Environment Agency has harbour authority responsibilities downstream
- River Glen, Lincolnshire - Environment Agency
- River Great Ouse - Environment Agency
- River Hamble Harbour Office
- River Idle - Environment Agency
- River Medway - Non-tidal: Environment Agency; Tidal: Medway Ports
- River Severn - Avon and Wiltshire: Bristol Haven Conservancy
- River Severn, Gloucestershire/Herefordshire: Gloucester Harbour Trustees
- River Tyne - Tidal: Port of Tyne Authority; Non-tidal: various
- Scottish waterways - managed by the Scottish Executive and British Waterways Scotland (BWS)
- Sleaford Navigation
- Somerset Council - as Harbour Authority for the Port of Bridgwater and the River Parrett
- Ulster Canal - various, both in Northern Ireland and the Republic of Ireland
- Waterways Ireland
- The Waterways Trust
- The Wey & Arun Canal Trust, Wey & Arun Junction Canal
- Wey and Godalming Navigations, National Trust
- Wilts & Berks Canal Trust
- River Witham - Witham Fourth District Drainage Board

== See also ==
=== Waterways ===
- List of waterways
- Waterways in the United Kingdom
- Association of Inland Navigation Authorities (AINA), an unincorporated membership organisation for inland navigation authorities
- Inland Waterways Association
- Scottish Inland Waterways Association
- Inland Waterways Association of Ireland (includes Northern Ireland)
- List of waterway societies in the United Kingdom

=== Rivers ===
- Rivers of the United Kingdom
- List of rivers of the United Kingdom
- Estuary, Firth, Floodplain, River delta, Source (river or stream), Tributary

=== Canals ===
- Canals of the United Kingdom
- List of canal aqueducts in Great Britain
- List of canal basins in Great Britain
- List of canal junctions in Great Britain
- List of canal locks in Great Britain
- List of canal tunnels in Great Britain

=== Seaports ===
- List of seaports

=== Other ===
- Navigability
- Tide
