= Chris Smith, Baron Smith of Finsbury =

British politician (born 1951)

The Right Honourable The Lord Smith of Finsbury PC
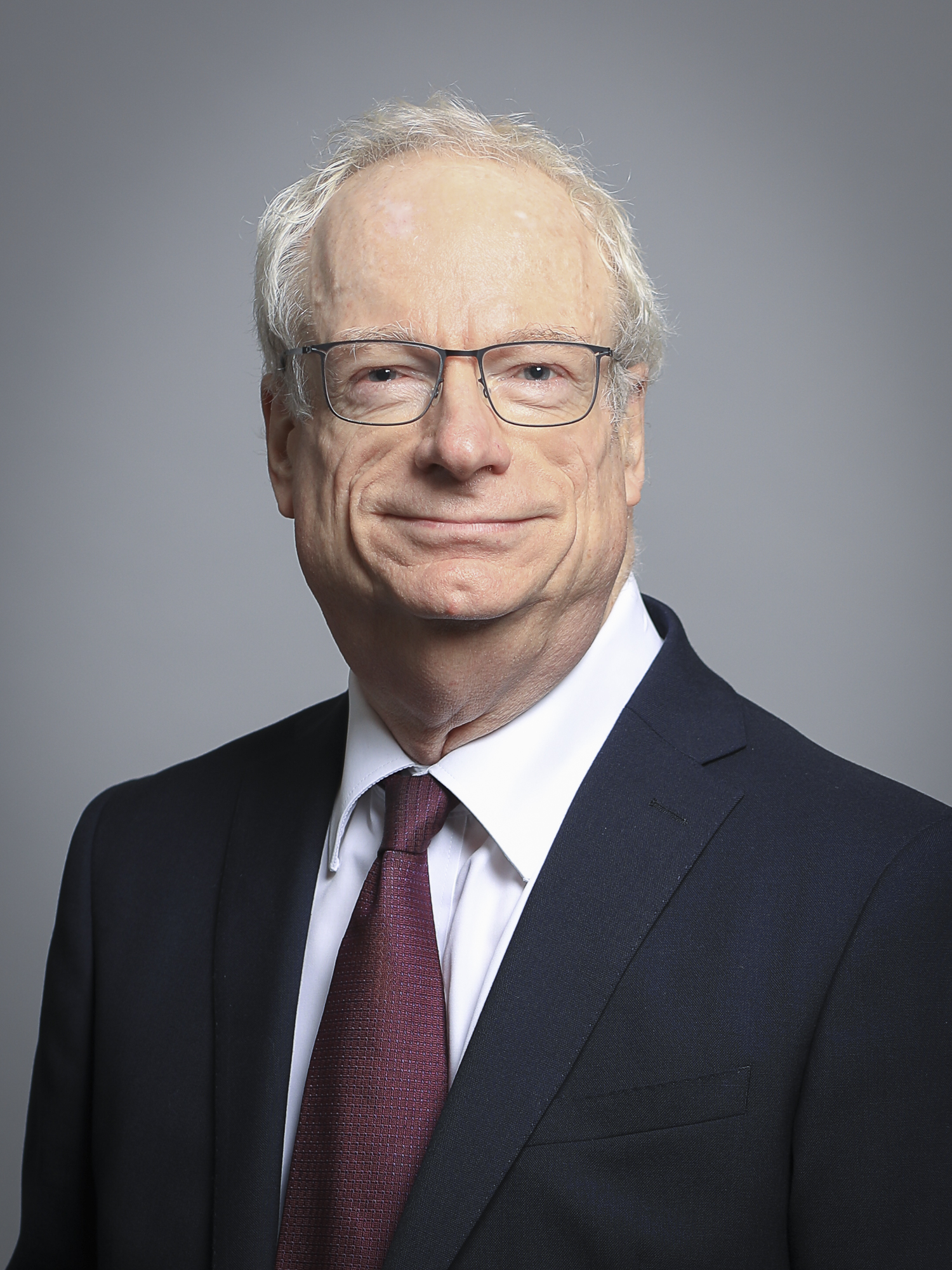
- Official portrait, 2020

Chancellor of the University of Cambridge
- Incumbent
- Assumed office 24 July 2025
- Preceded by: The Lord Sainsbury of Turville

Secretary of State for Culture, Media and Sport (Note: As Secretary of State for National Heritage from May to July 1997)
- In office 2 May 1997 – 8 June 2001
- Prime Minister: Tony Blair
- Preceded by: Virginia Bottomley
- Succeeded by: Tessa Jowell

Member of the House of Lords
- Lord Temporal
- Life peerage 22 June 2005

Member of Parliament for Islington South and Finsbury
- In office 9 June 1983 – 11 April 2005
- Preceded by: George Cunningham
- Succeeded by: Emily Thornberry

Shadow cabinet portfolios
- 1992–1994: Environment
- 1994–1995: National Heritage
- 1995–1996: Social Security
- 1996–1997: Health

Personal details
- Born: 24 July 1951 (age 75) Barnet, Hertfordshire, England
- Party: Labour (1979–2008, 2024–present); Independent (2008–2024)
- Domestic partner(s): Dorian Jabri (1989–2012)
- Education: University of Cambridge (BA, PhD); Harvard University
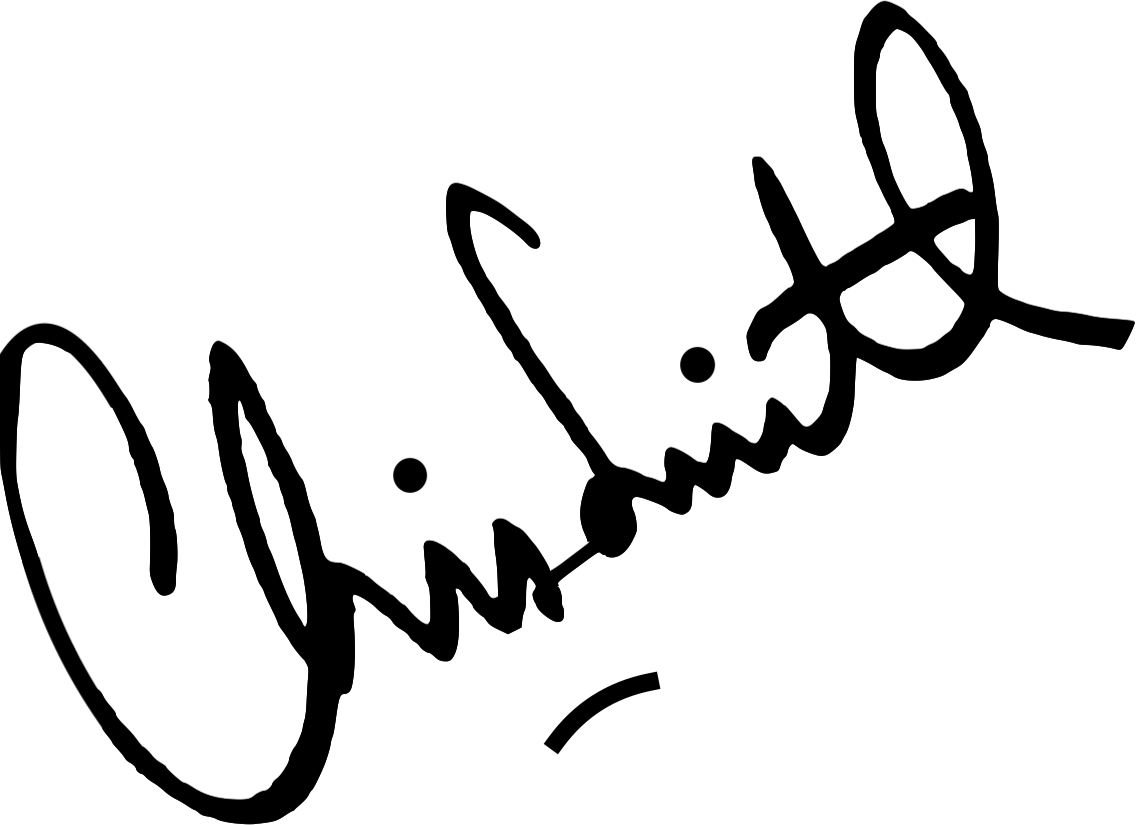
- Signature
- Website: members.parliament.uk/member/186/contact

Christopher Robert Smith, Baron Smith of Finsbury, PC (born 24 July 1951) is a British politician who served as Secretary of State for Culture, Media and Sport from 1997 to 2001. A member of the Labour Party, he was Member of Parliament (MP) for Islington South and Finsbury from 1983 to 2005 and was appointed to the House of Lords as a life peer in 2005 and became Chancellor of the University of Cambridge in 2025.

In 1984, Smith became the first openly gay male British MP and in 2005, the first MP to acknowledge that he is HIV positive. He served as Master of Pembroke College, Cambridge from 2015 to 2025 and was elected Chancellor of the University of Cambridge in 2025.

== Early life and education ==
Chris Smith was born in Barnet, London, and privately educated at George Watson's College in Edinburgh and the University of Cambridge where he was an undergraduate at Pembroke College, Cambridge starting in 1969. At Cambridge, he gained a first class honours degree in English, and a PhD degree in 1979 with a thesis on Wordsworth; he was also president of the Cambridge Union Society. He also attended Harvard University as a Kennedy Scholar from 1975 to 1976.

== Member of Parliament ==
He worked for a housing charity and became a councillor in the London Borough of Islington. He came third at Epsom and Ewell in the 1979 general election before narrowly winning the seat of Islington South and Finsbury at the 1983 general election, defeating George Cunningham, who had ultimately defected to the Social Democrats from Labour. Cunningham stood again at the 1987 general election when Smith retained the seat.

In 1984, he became Britain's first gay MP to choose to "come out". There had been several gay MPs before this whose homosexuality had been common knowledge in some circles, including their constituents in some cases, but they had not been completely open about it. (In 1975 Maureen Colquhoun had been effectively "outed" by press revelations.) During a rally in Rugby, Warwickshire, against a possible ban on gay employees by the town council, Smith began his speech: "Good afternoon, I'm Chris Smith, I'm the Labour MP for Islington South and Finsbury and I'm gay." This was unscripted, and the decision to include it in his speech was made at the last minute. He immediately received a standing ovation from most of the audience.

He became an opposition whip in 1986, a shadow Treasury minister from 1987 to 1992, and shadowed the environment, heritage, pensions and health portfolios between 1992 and 1997.

=== Secretary of State for Culture, Media and Sport ===
In 1997, he was appointed to Tony Blair's Cabinet as the Secretary of State for Culture, Media and Sport. As a Minister known to have a close connection with the arts scene in Britain, his time at DCMS is generally regarded as a success, for many projects funded through the National Lottery came to fruition. There were controversies, such as his approval during his first week as minister of the appointment of Mary Allen to the Royal Opera House. In this case, a Select Committee report later found that he had exceeded his authority and had improperly failed to seek advice from his Permanent secretary. He held this position throughout the Labour government's first term, but was sacked and returned to the back benches after the 2001 election, being replaced by Tessa Jowell.

=== Appointment to the House of Lords ===
After over 20 years in Parliament, Smith stepped down from the House of Commons at the 2005 general election. It was announced on 30 April 2005 that he was to be created a life peer, and the title was gazetted on 22 June 2005 as Baron Smith of Finsbury, of Finsbury in the London Borough of Islington.

== Retirement from politics ==
Smith was appointed Chair of the London Cultural Consortium (successor body to the Cultural Strategy Group) by Ken Livingstone, the then Mayor of London, and served from 2005 to 2008. He was awarded an Honorary Fellowship in 2010 from the University of Cumbria. In November 2006, he was appointed as Chairman of the Advertising Standards Authority. He was one of the founding directors of the Clore Leadership Programme, an initiative aimed at helping to train and develop new leaders of Britain's cultural sector. He is also currently Chairman of the Wordsworth Trust.

Smith is a keen mountaineer, and was the first MP to climb all the 3,000 ft "Munros" in Scotland; in April 2004, he was elected President of the Ramblers' Association. He is a patron of London-based HIV charity The Food Chain, and also Patron of HIV support charity The National Long-Term Survivors Group (NLTSG). He is also an honorary life member of BAFTA.

Smith was announced as the new Chairman of the Environment Agency on 8 May 2008, and took up the new role in mid-July. To maintain political independence in this role, he ceased to sit with the Labour group in the Lords and became a non-affiliated member. In an interview with The Independent in August that year he said Britain faced hard choices over which coasts to defend and which to leave to the sea, because it would not be possible to save all coastal homes from sea erosion. Lord Smith was re-appointed as Chair of the Environment Agency for a further three years by Environment Secretary Caroline Spelman in 2011. On re-appointment he received £100,813 pro rata for 2011–12, based on working three days a week. Lord Smith continued in this role until 13 July 2014.

Smith became a vice-president of the Campaign for Homosexual Equality in February 2009.

In 2010, he was awarded the Freedom of the Borough of Islington. At the event, then-Islington Lib Dem group leader Councillor Terry Stacy thanked Smith for "stepping out of the closet and standing up and being counted," noting that it was a "historic" event that paved the way for other gay politicians. In 2011, Smith was awarded an honorary Doctor of Letters from Lancaster University and in 2016 he was awarded an honorary Doctor of Philosophy from London Metropolitan University.

=== University of Cambridge ===
In December 2014, it was announced that Lord Smith would become the next Master of Pembroke College, Cambridge in 2015, succeeding Sir Richard Dearlove. He oversaw the receipt of the biggest single donation ever received by the University of Cambridge in 2015, when Ray Dolby donated £35m towards an expansion of the College grounds. He accepted an invitation to become the Chairman of Trustees of the Cambridge Union Society in 2015.

In July 2025 he was elected Chancellor of the University of Cambridge, and stepped down as Master of Pembroke. He was officially installed as Chancellor in March 2026 at a ceremony at the Senate House.

He is currently listed as the Chairman of the Task Force on Shale Gas.

== Personal life ==
In 2006, Smith entered a civil partnership with Dorian Jabri, his partner since 1989. The couple separated in 2012. Smith was a director of the Finsbury-based world jazz ensemble Grand Union Orchestra for a period in the mid-1990s.

=== HIV status ===
In 2003, Smith was contacted by a reporter from The Sunday Times asking for a comment on his health but declined, citing the Press Complaints Code. However, two years later, in 2005, he contacted the paper's editor and revealed in a story, titled "Why This is the Time to Break my HIV Silence", he had been diagnosed as HIV-positive as early as 1987. He stated he had decided to go public following Nelson Mandela's announcement of his son's death from AIDS.

== Legacy ==
In 2010, the LGBT+ Labour campaign fund Dorothy's List was renamed the Chris Smith List in his honour.

== Notes ==
Parliament of the United Kingdom
Preceded by George Cunningham	Member of Parliament for Islington South and Finsbury; 1983–2005	Succeeded by Emily Thornberry
Political offices
Preceded by Bryan Gould	Shadow Secretary of State for the Environment; 1992–1994	Succeeded by Frank Dobson
Preceded by Mo Mowlam	Shadow Secretary of State for National Heritage; 1994–1995	Succeeded by Jack Cunningham
Preceded by Donald Dewar	Shadow Secretary of State for Social Security; 1995–1997	Succeeded by Iain Duncan Smith
Preceded by Virginia Bottomley as Secretary of State for National Heritage	Secretary of State for Culture, Media and Sport; 1997–2001	Succeeded by Tessa Jowell
Party political offices
Preceded by Maggie Rice	Chair of the Fabian Society; 1997–1998	Succeeded by Margaret Hodge
Government offices
Preceded by John Harman	Chair of the Environment Agency; 2008–2014	Succeeded by Philip Dilley
Orders of precedence in the United Kingdom
Preceded by The Lord Moonie	Gentlemen; Baron Smith of Finsbury	Followed by The Lord Cunningham of Felling
Academic offices
Preceded by Sir Richard Dearlove	Master of Pembroke College, Cambridge; 2015–present	Incumbent
Preceded by The Lord Sainsbury of Turville	Chancellor of the University of Cambridge; 2025–present	Incumbent
