= List of navigation authorities in the United States =

This List of navigation authorities in the United States is a link list for any navigation authority in the United States.

== U.S. government ==
- United States Army Corps of Engineers
- United States Coast Guard
- United States Department of Homeland Security
- Bureau of Navigation
- Bureau of Marine Inspection and Navigation
- Office of Coast Survey
- National Oceanic and Atmospheric Administration

== Individual navigation authorities ==
- Arkansas River Navigation System
- California Debris Commission
- Great Lakes St. Lawrence Seaway Development Corporation
- Mississippi River Commission
- New York State Canal System, New York State Canal Corporation, New York State Thruway Authority
- Tennessee Valley Authority (1936)

== See also ==
- List of navigation authorities in the United Kingdom
