= Association of Inland Navigation Authorities =

The Association of Inland Navigation Authorities (AINA) is an unincorporated membership organization in the United Kingdom. It was formed in 1996, so that issues with the management of waterways could be discussed and a consensus reached. This made it easier to present the collective views of the members to government departments, regulators and other policy makers. Membership is available for navigation authorities in the United Kingdom who have legal responsibility for managing an inland waterway which is open and operational.

== List of member organizations ==
In 2025, the following organizations were members of the association.

- Avon Navigation Trust
- Basingstoke Canal Authority
- Bridgewater Canal Company
- Broads Authority
- Canal & River Trust
- Cardiff Harbour Authority
- Cheshire West and Chester Council (River Dee)
- City of York Council (River Foss)
- Conservators of the River Cam
- Derbyshire County Council (Chesterfield Canal, Derby Canal, and Cromford Canal)
- Devon County Council (Grand Western Canal)
- Environment Agency (Anglian, Southern and Thames regions)
- Essex Waterways (Chelmer and Blackwater Navigation)
- Middle Level Commissioners
- National Trust (Wey Navigation and Godalming Navigation)

== Activity ==
The association was set up with support from the UK government, who were keen that there should be a single point of contact for issues relating to waterway management. They publish good practice guides and have been responsible for the Code for the Design, Construction and Operation of Hire Boats, jointly produced with British Marine. This was first published in 2009 and updated in 2021. It is a national code for safe practice, and is recognized by the Maritime and Coastguard Agency. All boats which can carry up to 12 people and which are hired out without a skipper or crew must comply with its requirements.
