= The Environment Network for Manchester =

The Environment Network for Manchester (EN4M) is a group of environmental organisations centered in Manchester, England. Their activities focus on creating a sustainable urban environment and include but are not limited to: recycling, conservation, promotion of renewable energy use, and pollution control. EN4M allows local environmental groups to coordinate their efforts and share resources.

The Environment Network for Manchester was formed by MERCi.

MERCi the charity closed in 2017 and the EN4M newsletter was discontinued due to lack of funding, the EN4M group itself had ceased to exist some time before, again due to lack of funding. There is still a Facebook Group "Environment News for Greater Manchester". Bridge 5 Mill, which MERCi established, is still running under the ownership of the Fairfield Environment Trust and while it doesn't run EN4M, it continues to serve as a hub for Environmental Groups. Its Twitter and Facebook pages also perform some of the news role that EN4M served.

== Awards ==
In September 2008 The Community Network for Manchester (CN4M) Awarded The Environment Network for Manchester for excellent publicity and outreach.
