= Philip Dilley =

British civil servant (born 1955)

Sir Philip Dilley
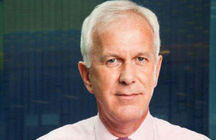

Chairman of the Council of Imperial College London
- Incumbent
- Assumed office May 2015
- Preceded by: Eliza Manningham-Buller

Chairman of the Environment Agency
- In office September 2014 – January 2016
- Preceded by: Chris Smith

Personal details
- Born: Philip Graham Dilley; 16 February 1955 (age 71)
- Citizenship: United Kingdom
- Education: Imperial College London

Sir Philip Graham Dilley (born 16 February 1955) is a British engineer, businessman, and public servant. He was the chairman of the Environment Agency in England. Dilley is a former business adviser to David Cameron.

== Early life ==
Dilley was born on 16 February 1955. He studied civil engineering at Imperial College London, and graduated with a first-class bachelor's degree in 1976.

== Career ==
=== Arup ===
Dilley joined Arup Group Limited on graduation, training as a structural engineer, specialising in building design where he turned architects drawings and residential plans into actual buildings and developments, in UK, Europe, Asia and the Middle East. Progressing through the group, he led the project to build Kansai International Airport, Arup's first major project in Japan.

Promoted to the board, Dilley became chairman of the board. In this position, he accompanied Prime Minister David Cameron on trade missions to India, China and Russia and was a guest at a state banquet at Windsor Castle when the Indian president was hosted by the Queen.

In 2012, Dilley was an elected Honorary Fellow of the Royal Institute of British Architects, and held a non-executive position at Grosvenor Group.

=== Public service ===
Since July 2011, Dilley has been a member of the Council of Imperial College London. On 18 May 2015, he was appointed chairman of the council, succeeding Baroness Manningham-Buller, to serve a four-year term.

From 2012 to 2014, Dilley served as Chairman of London First.

=== Environment Agency: 2014–2016 ===
Dilley was appointed as the Environment Agency's chairman in September 2014, succeeding Chris Smith in the post.

In December 2015, during the unprecedented flooding of northern England, he was criticised for failing to cut short a holiday to Barbados to lead the flood response. Although only required to work a three-day week for his £100k-a-year job, according to The Independent he had promised on appointment that he would work six or seven days a week and turn up in his Wellington boots if there was a crisis. His staff admitted he had been trying to avoid media scrutiny.

In January 2016, The Sunday Times described the Environment Agency's statement that Dilley's trip to Barbados was a family visit as a "Windies whopper" and an "attempt to mislead the public." The family had indeed been at their villa in Barbados but Lady Dilley is from Jamaica −1200 miles away and has no connection with Barbados. When interviewed on BBC Radio 4's Week in Westminster following suggestions he should resign, Conservative MP Nigel Evans agreed Dilley should spend more time in Barbados. In contrast, in the same newspaper Jeremy Clarkson wrote: "We pay him to do a job. And now we must leave him alone so that he can get on and do it."

Dilley resigned as chairman of the Environment Agency on 11 January 2016. He claimed he was stepping down because “expectations” of his role have changed to mean he has to be “available at short notice throughout the year”.

== Honours ==
Dilley was knighted in the 2014 Birthday Honours for services to engineering.

== Personal life ==
Dilley and his second wife June own a holiday home in Barbados.
