= Manchester Environmental Resource Centre initiative =

Environmental Charity initiative in Britain

Manchester Environmental Resource Centre initiative Ltd
- Founded: 1996
- Founder: Helen Woodcock, Chris Walsh, Cath Miller, Jane Pickering.
- Type: Charity
- Location: Ancoats, Manchester, UK
- Region served: Greater Manchester
- Key people: Caroline Downey, Executive Director.
- Website: www.merci.org.uk

Manchester Environmental Resource Centre initiative (MERCi) is a British environmental charity, based in Manchester. Its first project was to establish an environmental centre at Bridge 5 Mill in East Manchester.

MERCi promote social, environmental and economic sustainability for the city of Manchester. The Charity’s strapline is: "Ideas into Action for a Sustainable Future". According to their website, MERCI's aim is to work towards a future that is greener, safer, healthier and more equitable.

MERCi (pronounced 'murky') was established by a group of campaigners who were "frustrated by the lack of support, positive vision and available resources to make Manchester a more sustainable city".

== History ==
Four individuals: Chris Walsh, Helen Woodcock, Cath Miller and Jane Pickering established MERCi over five years beginning in 1996, culminating in the centre's official launch on 25 April 2001.

The group raised over £3 million and project managed the refurbishment of the mill, utilising funding from the National Lottery, Esmée Fairbairn Foundation, The Tudor Trust and the European Regional Development Fund.

The Mill was refurbished with the support of volunteers and trainees and is one of Manchester's most environmentally friendly buildings. Manchester Civic Society acknowledged this in 2001 when Bridge 5 Mill won an award as Manchester's most energy efficient building. A green roof was added in 2008 to encourage wildlife to the building.

== Activities ==
=== Bridge 5 Mill ===
Bridge 5 Mill was Manchester's first Centre for Change, a converted five story mill on the border of Beswick and Ancoats on the Ashton Canal, it was named after the fifth bridge on the canal: bridge number 5. It became "a focal point for debate and action around sustainability". It is home to a range of charities, campaign groups and green businesses. The centre provides community resources including conference and meeting rooms, a library, equipment hire and offices for voluntary groups and social enterprises.

=== Environment Network for Manchester ===
The Environment Network for Manchester (EN4M) was established by MERCi and is based at Bridge 5 Mill. It is a membership organisation made up of groups and organisations which share MERCi's aim of improving the environment of Manchester, towards the development of a truly sustainable city.

=== Herbie ===
Herbie is a mobile greengrocer set up by MERCi in 2004 to provide affordable, fresh fruit and vegetables to residents living in areas of East Manchester with poor access to fresh foods. Customers can walk on board and they also supply boxes of fruit to schools and community projects, working with sheltered housing, churches, health clinics and resident groups.

== Mission statement ==
According to their website, MERCi’s mission statement is:

- MERCi believes that the most effective way to involve people in a vision for a sustainable Manchester is to establish a Centre for Sustainable Living in the heart of the city.
- MERCi will therefore strive to create a Centre that provides support, stability and advice to organisations and individuals that share this vision of sustainable living and will seek to advance public awareness around sustainability issues.
- MERCi will ensure that the Centre for Sustainable Living is a working demonstration of eco-design, refurbishment best practice and sustainable living in an urban environment.
- MERCi believes in a local and fair sustainable economy. It will, therefore, promote and provide support for community-based initiatives that create socially and ecologically worthwhile secure employment for local people.

== See also ==
- Environment of the United Kingdom
