= Environmental inequality in the United Kingdom =

British environmentalism

Environmental inequality in the United Kingdom is the way in which the quality of the environment differs between different communities in the UK. These differences are felt across a number of aspects of the environment, including air pollution, access to green space and exposure to flood risk.

== The concept of 'environmental inequality' ==
=== Definitions ===
The Environment Agency, a British non-departmental public body of the Department for Environment, Food and Rural Affairs (DEFRA), defines 'environmental inequality' as follows: 'To observe or claim an environmental inequality is to point out that an aspect of the environment is distributed unevenly amongst different social groups (differentiated by social class, ethnicity, gender, age, location, etc.)'.

The Sustainable Development Research Network (SDRN) define environmental inequality as follows: 'Environmental inequality refers to the unequal distribution of environmental risks and hazards and access to environmental goods and services.'

Gordon Walker (Department of Geography, Lancaster Environment Centre, Lancaster University and Malcolm Eames (University of Cardiff) defines 'environmental inequality' as 'covering a wide range of questions of difference or unevenness, including:

- Who has good quality and safe environment to live in, who experiences pollution, hazards and risks and who is distanced or protected from such impacts?
- Who accesses and consumes environmental resources and who is unable to do so, or limited in their degree of access and consumption?
- Who is able to shape environmental decision-making and who is not? Who is included who is excluded?'

Sociologist Liam Downey (2005) has distinguished five different ways of defining environmental inequality:

i) Intentional racism definitions: According to this definition, environmental inequalities arise when environmental hazards are intentionally placed in minority neighbourhoods by private companies.

ii) Disparate exposure definitions: According to this definition, environmental inequalities arise 'when members of a specific social group are more highly exposed to some set of environmental pollutants than we would expect if group members were randomly distributed across residential space'.

iii) Disparate health impact definitions: According to this definition, environmental inequalities arise 'when the negative health effects of residential proximity or exposure to environmental hazards are distributed unequally across social groups.'

iv) Disparate social impacts definitions: According to this definition, environmental inequalities arise 'when members of a specific social group are more likely to live in environmentally hazardous neighborhoods than we would expect if group members were randomly distributed across residential space.'

v) Relative distribution of burdens versus benefits definitions: According to this definition, environmental inequalities arise when groups that receive greater benefits from capitalist social relations (according to proponents of this definition, this means whites and the middle and upper classes) are less burdened by industrial pollution than groups that receive fewer benefits from capitalist social relations (according to proponents of this definition, this means people of colour, the poor and the working classes).

=== History ===
The concept of environmental inequality emerged in the context of the movement for Environmental Justice. The Environmental Justice movement originated in the US in the 1980s in response to concerns about communities from poor, black and minority ethnic environments being disproportionately affected by environmental issues and excluded from environmental decision-making.

Much initial progress on promoting an Environmental Justice agenda in the UK was made in Scotland, beginning with a speech made by Jack McConnell, First Minister of the Scottish Executive in 2002. McConnell said: '... the reality is that the people who have the most urgent environmental concerns in Scotland are those who daily cope with the consequences of a poor quality of life, and live in a rotten environment – close to industrial pollution, plagued by vehicle emissions, streets filled by litter and walls covered in graffiti. This is true for Scotland and also true elsewhere in the world. These are circumstances which would not be acceptable to better off communities in our society, and those who have to endure such environments in which to bring up a family, or grow old themselves are being denied environmental justice.'

Following this speech, and in light of Environmental Justice campaigning by Friends of the Earth Scotland, references to Environmental Justice have been made in several Scottish policy documents (e.g. Scottish Executive 2002c, 2003, 2003a (the Partnership Agreement); Scottish Executive Development Department, 2001, 2003, 2004, and 2005). The Scottish Executive, in 2005, commissioned research into ways of making environmental information more accessible to the public, and has also recently commissioned a study that investigates the social impacts of flooding.

An Environmental Justice agenda has also been emerging in England since the late 1990s. In 1999, Environment Minister Michael Meacher wrote, in a foreword to 'Equality and the Environment' by Brenda Boardman: 'environmental problems are serious and impact most heavily on the most vulnerable members of society: the old, the very young and the poor.' In a 2001 speech, Prime Minister Tony Blair spoke about the need to address environmental issues such as access to green space and air quality in deprived urban areas and in a speech given to the UN in New York, 2007, Prime Minister Gordon Brown said that 'the consequences of climate change will be disproportionately felt by the poorest who are least responsible for it – making the issue of climate change one of justice as much as economic development...economic progress social justice and environmental care now go together.'

The presence of this agenda became clear at a policy level in England, in DEFRA's 1999 Sustainable Development Strategy 'A Better Life', in which there was a focus on access to environmental information, decision making and justice. The Environmental Justice theme was evident again in the 2004 Sustainable Development Strategy, which commissioned a public consultation on issues around environmental justice and equality. Further, in 2003, the government's Social Exclusion Unit published a report that examined issues around inequalities in transport and pollution. One governmental actor involved in pushing forward the Environmental Justice agenda was The Office of the Deputy Prime Minister. In 2004, it included environmental factors in its indices of deprivation and, in 2005, it commissioned research into the links between social and economic conditions and environmental quality. The UK Environmental Justice agenda was also taken on by the government's Sustainable Development Commission (SDC). In their November 2001 review of the UK's Sustainable Development Strategy, SDC approached issues of regeneration, poverty and the environment with an environmental justice perspective, and in their 2002 report 'Vision for Sustainable Regeneration, Environment and Poverty', SDC stressed the need for a new approach to sustainable regeneration that acknowledges the importance of environmental inequalities and the links between poverty and the environment.

The discourse around environmental justice in the UK is often framed in terms of 'environmental equality', following DEFRA's decision to use environmental equality as one of its sustainable development indicators.

== People affected ==
The Environment Agency states that 'People who are socially and economically disadvantaged often live in the worst environments. For example, those living in the most deprived parts of England experience the worst air quality and have less access to green space and adequate housing. These problems can affect people's health and well-being and can add to the burden of social and economic deprivation. They can also limit the opportunities available for people to improve their lives and undermine attempts to renew local neighbourhoods. Those affected tend to be the most vulnerable and excluded in society.'

There is also evidence that people from BME (black and minority ethnic) backgrounds suffer the worst environmental conditions, and are excluded from environmental decision-making. UK NGO and think-tank Capacity Global, in 'BMEs – Tackling Social and Environmental Justice', argue that several barriers exist, which hinder BAME communities' action on tackling environmental problems.

== Examples ==
=== Access to parks, green spaces and the natural environment ===
The most affluent 20 per cent of council wards have five times the amount of parks or general green space (excluding gardens) per person than the most deprived 10 per cent of wards. Wards with a population with fewer than 2% black and minority ethnic residents have six times as many parks and eleven times more public green space as wards where more than 40 per cent of the population are people from black and minority ethnic groups.

According to a 2011 DEFRA White Paper on the Natural Environment, people in deprived areas are nearly six times less likely than those in affluent ones to describe their area as 'green', and 'those living in deprived areas, minority ethnic communities, elderly people and those with disabilities have less access to green spaces or tend to use them less.' This paper also noted that the frequency of exposure to the natural environment (incorporating a broad array of living things including wildlife, forests, rivers, streams, lakes, seas, countryside, farmed land and urban green space) is 'significantly lower' amongst those aged above 65, BME populations and those on low incomes (members of DE socioeconomic groups).

According to the government's Forestry Commission, several factors interact to prevent black and minority ethnic groups from having the same access to woodland as other groups. These are: economic factors; lack of awareness, familiarity, knowledge, confidence or interest; cultural attitudes and preferences; feeling unwelcome and out of place.

=== Exposure to flood risk ===
Deprived communities are more exposed to flood risk, with eight times more people in the most deprived 10% of the population living in tidal floodplains than the least deprived 10%. People in deciles 1 and 2 (decile 1 being the most deprived 10% of the population and decile 2 the second most deprived 10%) are 47 per cent more likely to be living at risk of flooding than the rest of the population for zone 2 floodrisk areas, and 62% more likely for zone 3.

=== Air pollution ===
The worst levels of air pollution are experienced by people in the most deprived 10% areas in England. These people are also subject to 41% higher concentrations of nitrogen dioxide from transport and industry than the average. The average black or black-British African in the UK person is exposed to 27.25 micrograms per cubic metre of harmful pollutant PM10. This is over 28% higher than the average urban white person.

=== Exposure to harmful chemicals ===
A 1999 Friends of the Earth report found that 82% of all carcinogenic chemical emissions were released by factories in the most deprived 20% wards. Further, the report suggested that because 70% of all people from ethnic minorities in the UK live in the 88 most deprived wards, this exposure to harmful chemicals disproportionately affects these people.

=== Transport-related problems ===
Over a quarter of child pedestrian casualties happen in the most deprived 10% of wards. In Wales, children and people aged over 65 are twice as likely to be injured by motor vehicles in deprived areas than in more advantaged areas.

=== Proximity to waste and landfill sites ===
An investigation by the Environment Agency into Environmental Justice in South Yorkshire revealed that in South Yorkshire, people in decile 1 are twice as likely to be living next to a recycling site, a waste transfer site or a landfill site as the rest of the population and three times more likely to be living near to an amenity site. In the UK as a whole, deprived communities are more likely to live near waste sites except landfill sites, where it is the least deprived populations that are located nearby.

=== Export of products banned for sale in the UK ===
Innospec, a company based in Ellesmere Port, is the last remaining manufacturer of tetraethyl lead in the world. The product is banned for general sale in the UK, but has been exported to countries such as Afghanistan, Burma, Iraq and Yemen. The firm has admitted paying bribes to foreign officials. Journalist George Monbiot has argued that Innospec was let off lightly for the bribery and has termed the continued permissiveness in allowing Innospec to export its product as 'environmental racism'.

== Causes ==
As for the causes of environmental inequalities in the UK, the Environment Agency writes: 'The causes of these inequalities are often complex and long-standing. Some problems are due to the historical location of industry and communities; others are the result of the impacts of new developments such as traffic. Often these environmental problems are caused by the actions of others who do not live in the affected community. Often those most affected have not been involved in the decisions that affect the quality of their environment.' Environmental equity advocates often argue that environmental inequalities are entrenched due to the fact that the vulnerable communities exposed to environmental burdens lack the means necessary to change their situation due to factors such as limited economic means, exclusion from decision-making processes and institutionalised racism.

== Work being done ==
The UK government has included environmental equality as one of its sustainable development indicators since the establishment of these indicators in 1992. Further, DEFRA have incorporated an environmental inequalities analysis into its work, and the Environment Agency have published several reports on environmental inequality.

In Wales, action around environmental inequalities has primarily been coordinated through the Welsh Assembly's Community First initiative, which has attempted to enable deprived communities to take action themselves on sustainable development issues, with a particular focus on health inequalities and the health benefits of access to environmental goods. The Welsh Assembly have recognised the environmental aspects of deprivation, incorporating this into its 2008 index of multiple deprivation.

Several UK academics have published widely around environmental inequalities. Academics working on environmental inequalities include Gordon Walker of Lancaster University and Professor Malcolm Eames of Cardiff University. In 2006, Brunel University and Lancaster University organised a series of seminars on environmental inequalities. This was supported by the Economic & Social Research Council, the Natural Environment Research Council, the Sustainable Development Research Council, the Environment Agency and DEFRA.

The following UK NGOs work on issues around environmental inequalities:

- Friends of the Earth do some work on issues around environmental justice and inequalities. In 2001, they published a briefing on Environmental Justice with the ESRC and they have also published a report on social exclusion and transport in Bradford.
- Friends of the Earth Scotland have a particularly strong focus on environmental justice and have conducted research into and campaigned on inequalities in exposure to air pollution.
- Capacity Global are an NGO and think-tank that work on issues around environmental justice and environmental inequality.
- The London Sustainability Exchange have worked on environmental inequalities in London.
- Groundwork UK, in a report called 'Fair and Green', examine the relationship between environmental problems, deprivation and social justice and focus on the issue of environmental inequalities.

== See also ==
- Environmental direct action in the United Kingdom
- Environmental issues in the United Kingdom
- Environmental racism in Europe
- Environmental racism
- Environmentalism
- Poverty in the United Kingdom
