= Environment of the United Kingdom =

This is a list of articles relating to the environment of the United Kingdom.

- Anti-nuclear movement in the United Kingdom
- Conservation in the United Kingdom
- Climate of the United Kingdom
- Climate change in the United Kingdom
- Environmental inequality in the United Kingdom
- Environmental issues in the United Kingdom
- Environmental direct action in the United Kingdom
- Recycling in the United Kingdom
- Waste in the United Kingdom

== See also ==
- Environment of England
- Environment of Northern Ireland
- Environment of Scotland
- Environment of Wales
- Environment of the European Union
