= Flood Forecasting Centre (UK) =

Provides improved flood risk guidance for England and Wales

The Flood Forecasting Centre (FFC) is a joint venture between the Environment Agency and the Met Office to provide improved flood risk guidance for England and Wales. The FFC is based in the Operations Centre at the Met Office headquarters in Exeter and is jointly staffed from both organisations.

== Formation and role ==
The FFC was officially opened on 21 April 2009 in London by Environment Minister Hilary Benn. Its role is to provide better advice to governments, local authorities, emergency responders and the general public via its parent organisations. It faced its first major test in November 2009 when severe flooding affected Northern England, in particular Cumbria and the town of Cockermouth. The Pitt Review progress report highlighted the accuracy of the advice issued ahead of this event. In April 2011 the FFC moved from central London to a permanent base within the Operations Centre at the Met Office HQ in Exeter. It currently provides a range of operational Hydrometeorology services across England and Wales.
