= Operating authority =

An operating authority is a body empowered under the Land Drainage Act 1991 or Water Resources Act 1991 to undertake land drainage or flood protection work in England and Wales. Operating authorities include internal drainage boards, the Environment Agency and local authorities.
