= Fens and Anglian system =

River system in East Anglia, England

Coordinates: 53.20°N 0.53°W

Map of proposed Fens Waterways Link

River Ancholme

The Fens and Anglian system is a collection of rivers in East Anglia in England that are navigable and for which the Environment Agency is the navigation authority.

Many of the rivers drain The Fens between Cambridgeshire and Lincolnshire. These comprise River Glen, Great Ouse, River Nene, and River Welland. The Environment Agency is organising the Fens Waterways Link a major construction project to link these rivers for navigation. The first stage is the South Forty-Foot Drain.

Two East Anglian rivers in the grouping are physically separate from the Fens network. These are the River Ancholme in North Lincolnshire which connects to the Humber estuary, and the River Stour which is in Suffolk.

The Environment Agency supervises craft registration for these rivers.

== See also ==
- List of rivers of England
