= Hydrometeorology =

Branch of meteorology and hydrology

Water cycle

Hydrometeorology is a branch of meteorology and hydrology that studies the transfer of water and energy between the land surface and the lower atmosphere for academic research, commercial gain or operational forecasting purposes.

Whilst traditionally meteorologists and hydrologists sit within separate organisations, hydrometeorologists may work in joint project teams, virtual teams, deal with specific incidents or be permanently co-located to deliver specific objectives. Hydrometeorologists typically have a foundation in one or other discipline before undertaking additional training and specialist forecaster training depending on requirements. The cross over skills and knowledge between the two disciplines can bring organisational benefits in terms of efficiencies in terms of using tools and data available, and provide benefits in terms of enhanced lead times ahead of hydrometeorological hazards occurring.

UNESCO has several programs and activities in place that deal with the study of natural hazards of hydrometeorological origin and the mitigation of their effects. Among these hazards are the results of natural processes and atmospheric, hydrological, or oceanographic phenomena such as floods, tropical cyclones, drought, and desertification. Many countries have established an operational hydrometeorological capability to assist with forecasting, warning, and informing the public of these developing hazards.

== Hydrometeorological forecasting ==
One of the more significant aspects of hydrometeorology involves predictions about and attempts to mitigate the effects of high precipitation events. There are three primary ways to model meteorological phenomena in weather forecasting, including nowcasting, numerical weather prediction, and statistical techniques. Nowcasting is good for predicting events a few hours out, utilizing observations and live radar data to combine them with numerical weather prediction models. The primary technique used to forecast weather, numerical weather prediction uses mathematical models to account for the atmosphere, ocean, and many other variables when producing forecasts. These forecasts are generally used to predict events days or weeks out. Finally, statistical techniques use regressions and other statistical methods to create long-term projections that go out weeks and months at a time. These models allow scientists to visualize how a multitude of different variables interact with one another, and they illustrate one grand picture of how the Earth's climate interacts with itself.

== Risk assessment ==
A major component of hydrometeorology is mitigating the risk associated with flooding and other hydrological threats. First, there has to be knowledge of the possible hydrological threats that are expected within a specific region. After analyzing the possible threats, warning systems are put in place to quickly alert people and communicate to them the identity and magnitude of the threat. Many nations have their own specific regional hydrometeorological centers that communicate threats to the public. Finally, there must be proper response protocols in place to protect the public during a dangerous event.

== Operational hydrometeorology in practice ==
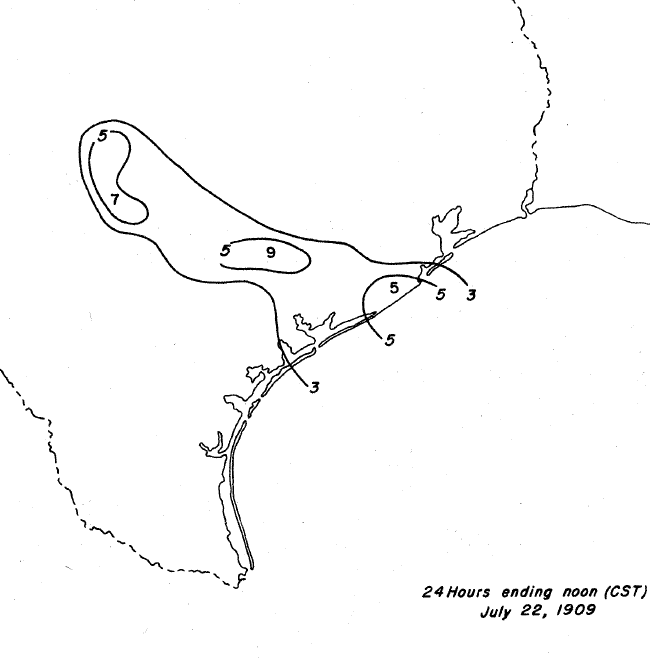
Rainfall forecasts for the 1909 Velasco hurricane produced by the US Hydrometeorological Prediction Center (now the Weather Prediction Center)

Countries with a current operational hydrometeorological service include, among others:

- Australia (Bureau of Meteorology)
- Brazil (National Center for Natural Disaster Monitoring and Alerts)
- Canada (Environment Canada)
- England and Wales (Flood Forecasting Centre)
- France
- Germany
- India
- Scotland (Flood Forecasting Service)
- Serbia (Republic Hydrometeorological Service of Serbia)
- Russia (Hydrometeorological Centre of Russia)
- United States (Hydrometeorological Prediction Center, known as the Weather Prediction Center since 2013)
