= John Harman (British politician) =

English Chairman of the British Environment Agency (born 1950)

Sir John Andrew Harman DL (born 30 July 1950) is a former chairman of the Environment Agency.

== Early life ==
He attended the independent St George's College, Weybridge. From the University of Manchester he gained a BSc degree in maths, then did a PGCE at Huddersfield College of Education.

== Career ==
He was a maths teacher at Greenhead College in Huddersfield from 1973 to 1979. He was Head of Maths at Barnsley Sixth Form College from 1979 to 1990, then Senior Maths Lecturer at Barnsley College (it took over the sixth form college) from 1990 to 1997.

He became a member of the UK Labour Party from 1977 and was elected to the West Yorkshire Metropolitan Council. After the metropolitan councils were disbanded under Margaret Thatcher, he was elected to, and led, Kirklees Council from 1986 to 1999, during which he was Councillor for the Paddock ward of Huddersfield. At the 1987 General Election, he was the parliamentary candidate for Colne Valley, west of Huddersfield, coming second to Graham Riddick of the Conservatives.

In 2000, he became Chairman of the Environment Agency, and left in 2008.

== Recognition ==
He received a knighthood in 1997 for services to local government and the environment. Sir John is also a fellow of the Royal Society of Arts and an honorary fellow of the Institution of Civil Engineers.

== Personal life ==
He married Susan Crowther in 1971. They have one son and three daughters.
