= Navigation authority =

A navigation authority is a company or statutory body which is concerned with the management of a navigable canal or river.

== Rights of a navigation authority ==
Whilst the rights of individual authorities vary, a navigation authority will typically have a right to:

- Implement a registration or licensing scheme for boats on waterways under their control
- Levy a licence fee, tolls or both on vessels using the waterway
- Lay down rules regarding the manner in which vessels shall be navigated.

== Responsibilities of a navigation authority ==
Again, responsibilities vary, but will usually include:

- Maintaining locks and other structures
- Dredging the channel
- Flood control

== Ownership of the waterway ==
Whilst a navigation authority may own the land over which the waterway runs, and usually does in the case of artificial waterways, this is not invariably the case, and particularly in the case of river navigations, the land beneath the river may belong to riparian landowners.

== List of navigation authorities ==
=== United Kingdom ===
==== Major authorities ====
- Canal & River Trust - most canals and approximately half of all rivers
- Environment Agency
  - Fens and Anglian system: Ancholme, Glen, Great Ouse, Nene, Stour, Welland
  - Medway
  - Wye and Lugg
  - Non-tidal Thames
  - Royal Military Canal

==== Minor authorities ====
- Basingstoke Canal Authority (Basingstoke Canal)
- Broads Authority
- Conservators of the River Cam
- Manchester Ship Canal Company
- Port of Tyne
- Middle Level Commissioners (Middle Level Navigations)
- National Trust (River Wey and Godalming Navigations)
- Port of London Authority (Tidal River Thames)

==== Other bodies ====
- Association of Inland Navigation Authorities

=== France ===
- Voies navigables de France

=== The Netherlands ===
- Rijkswaterstaat

=== United States ===
- List of navigation authorities in the United States

== See also ==
- Canals of the United Kingdom
- History of the British canal system
