= Environmental issues in the United Kingdom =

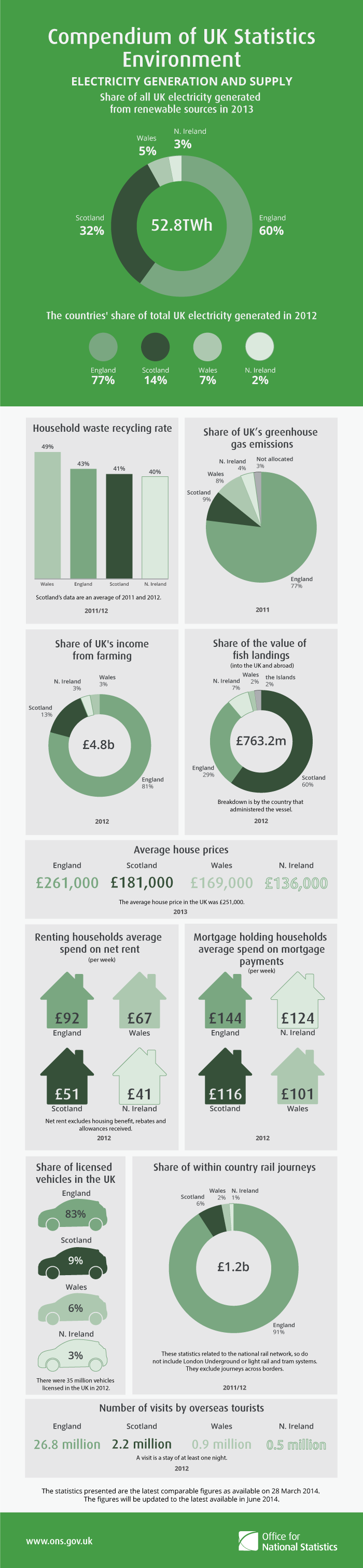
Compendium of UK Statistics - Environment

This page lists the issues that the United Kingdom currently has that are related to the environment, such as pollution and contamination.

In 2015, it was reported that for the past decade, the state of the environment in London had significantly deteriorated both in urban and rural areas. According to the UK NEA, grazing air pollution and the forces of climate change have significantly affected the mountainous regions of the UK. Due to climate change; rising seawater temperatures and exploitation of marine resources led to a serious loss of quality in UK marine ecosystems. Air pollution, climate change, litter, waste, and soil contamination are all a part of the human activity that create these environmental issues in the UK.

== Climate change ==
According to Lord Stern of Brentford, the flooding and storms in UK in 2014 were clear signs of climate change.

In the waters of the United Kingdom, climate and ocean changes can affect and threatened species by influencing the efficacy of measures designed to protect them. Waterfront cities, which make up the majority of the United Kingdom, are reported to have a great challenge ahead of them in terms of resilience to climate change.

== Pollution ==
=== Air pollution ===
Some examples of natural substances that contribute to air pollution in the UK are dust and pollen while examples of man-made substances contributing to the problem are gases that come from cars and truck exhaust. Additionally, air pollution is the cause of 10% of all deaths in the United Kingdom. Individuals with heart and lung disease are most affected by air pollution, but exposure has also been linked to stroke, diabetes, obesity and dementia. It has been reported in multiple headlines that air pollution kills 29,000 people a year in the United Kingdom.

=== Litter ===
The Marine Conservation Society (MCS) revealed that its annual beach litter report has shown a rising trend in rubbish on United Kingdom shores over 20 years. The latest results from Great British Beach Clean event show that plastic pieces are the most frequently found items on United Kingdom beaches, not only that but the results show that plastic accounted for over 50% of all the litter that was recorded. In addition to this, litter in UK oceans have been widely affecting the marine life. The Scottish government has acknowledged littering as a serious problem in their oceans and have begun a process to advance strategies that will work to prevent harm to the marine life and the environment.

=== Waste ===
Currently the UK landfills 27,000,000 tonnes a year of municipal solid waste with 60% turning out to be biodegradable. Recycling/reuse together with composting have become the dominant methods of waste management in the UK, accounting for 42.2% of the total MSW. In 2012, 13.1 million tonnes of MSW was composted or recycled in the United Kingdom, which represented an increase of 27.3% since 2002.

== Soil contamination ==
Soil contamination in the United Kingdom has been an ongoing issue in some regions and is not only recently developing, the Hg record of sediment samples taken from Diss Mere, United Kingdom show that the soil has been contaminated for the past thousand years, this increases the risk of potential pollutants to enter the atmosphere. Soil contamination, like littering, is caused by improper disposal of waste materials. Furthermore, there have been reports of multi-element contamination of soils and plants in parts of England that have been formerly known as mining areas, which leads to compromising soil matter.

== Forests ==
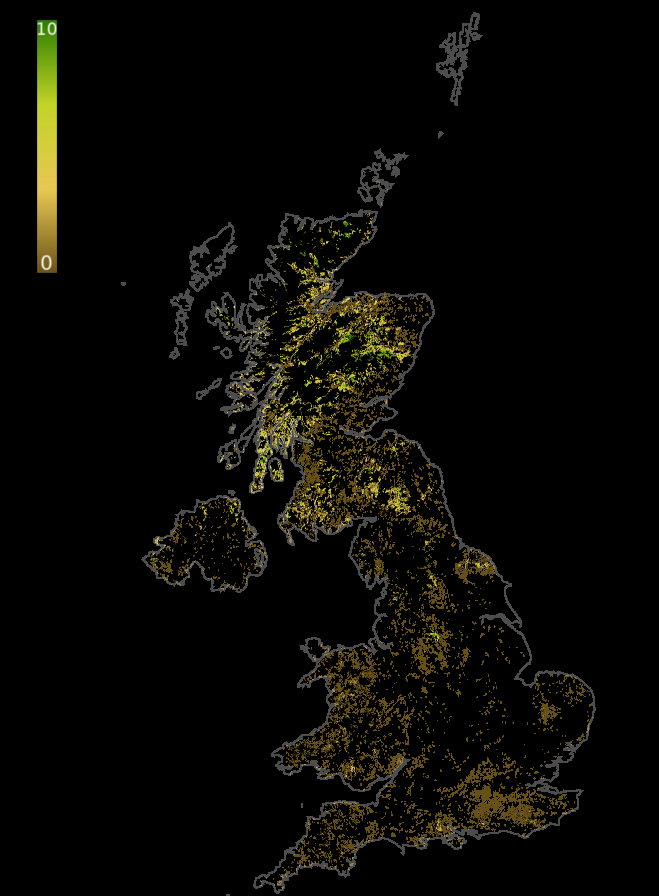
Forest Landscape Integrity Index map of the UK for 2019

The UK had a 2018 Forest Landscape Integrity Index mean score of 1.65/10, ranking it 161st globally out of 172 countries.

== See also ==
- A Green New Deal
- Energy in the United Kingdom
- Environmental direct action in the United Kingdom
- Environmental effects of aviation in the United Kingdom
- Environmental inequality in the United Kingdom
- Environmental issues in Wales
- Green Party of England and Wales
- Scottish Greens
