= Conservators of the River Cam =

River management authority in England

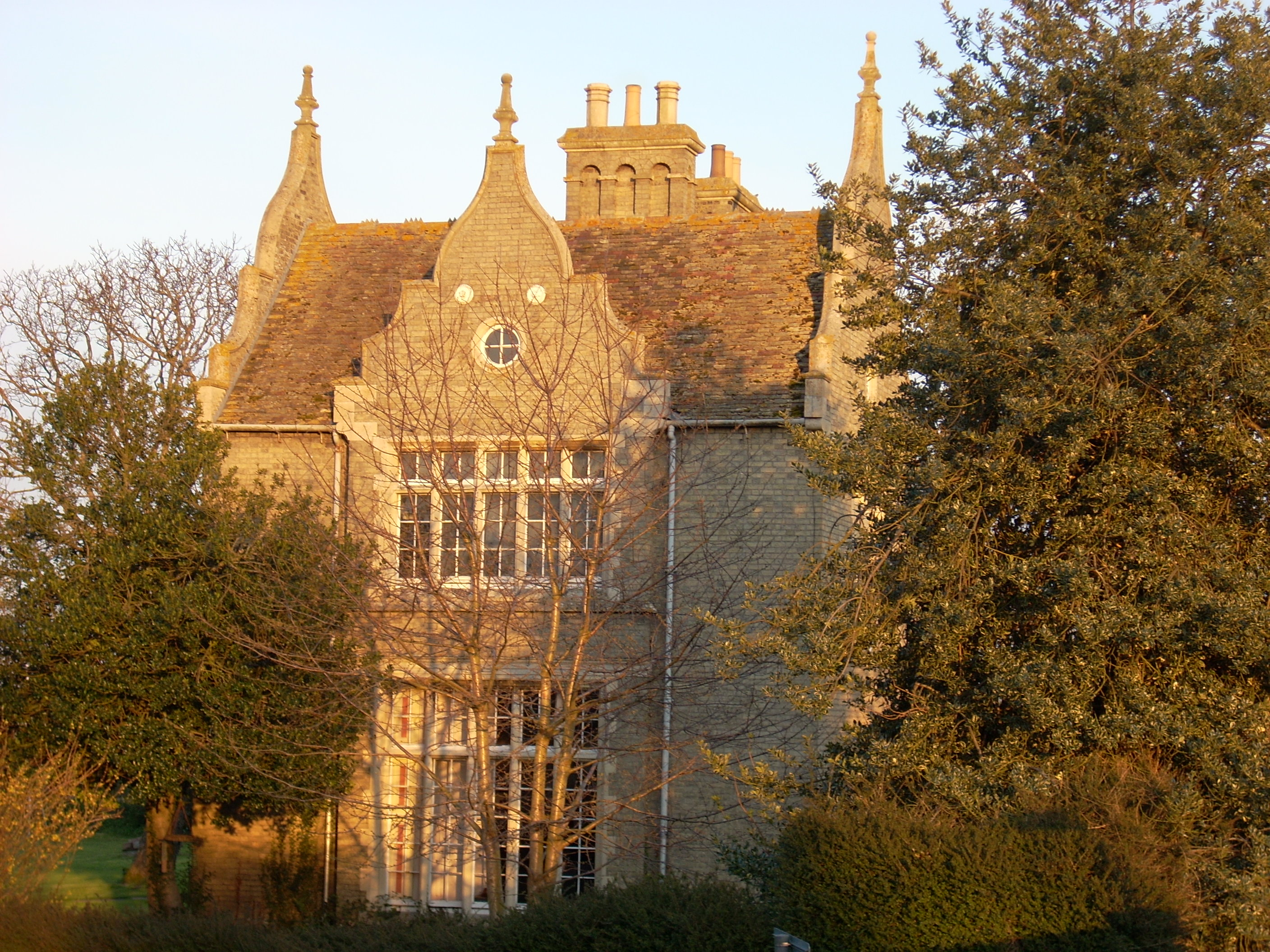
The Conservators' House in Clayhithe

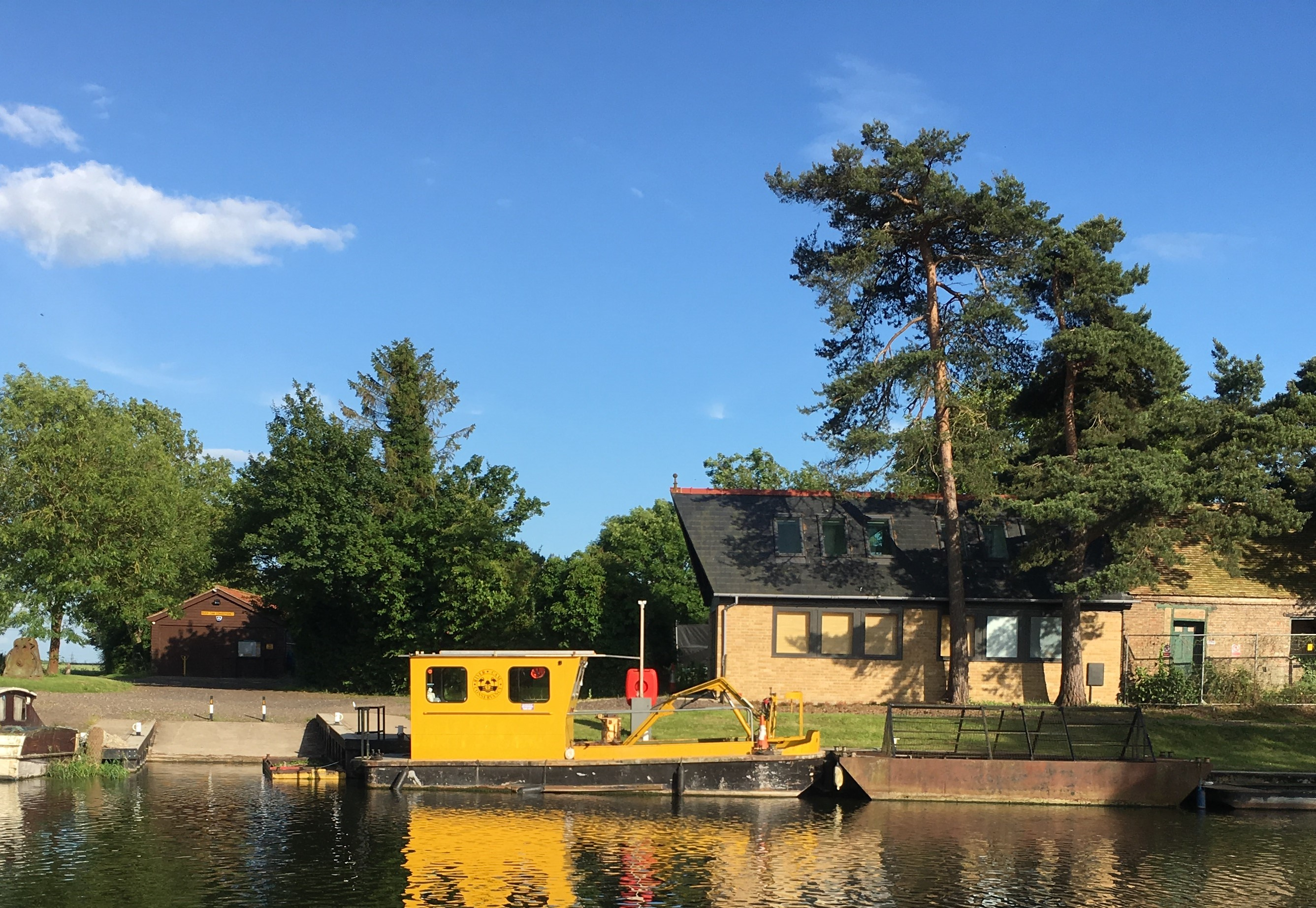
View of the "River Cam Conservators" boat and buildings at Clayhithe taken from The Bridge Pub on the opposite bank.

The Conservators of the River Cam are the navigation authority for the River Cam in Cambridgeshire and were founded in 1702.

== History ==
Cambridge had been a major inland port as a result of its position on the navigable River Cam for centuries, but this position changed with the draining of the Fens. The most notable change was caused by the construction of Denver sluice on the River Great Ouse, under the terms of the Commonwealth parliament's Drainage Act of 1649, which resulted in tidal waters being cut off from the River Cam. Navigation became difficult, and in 1697, both the University of Cambridge and the town corporation complained to Parliament that the supply of goods to the town from Kings Lynn was greatly impaired.

River Cam Navigation Act 1702
- Act of Parliament
- Parliament of England
- Long title: An Act for making the River Cham, alias Grant, in the County of Cambridge, more navigable, from Hyth-Ferry to The Queen's Mill, in the University and Town of Cambridge.
- Citation: 1 Ann. St. 2. c. 11
- Territorial extent: England and Wales

Dates
- Royal assent: 27 February 1703
- Commencement: 20 October 1702 (Note: Start of session.)
- Repealed: 24 July 1851
Other legislation
Repealed by	River Cam Navigation Act 1851
Relates to	River Cam Navigation Act 1813

Status: Repealed

Text of statute as originally enacted

Against this background, the corporation sought to obtain an act of Parliament in 1699, which would allow them to reinstate navigation to Cambridge. The act was obtained on 27 February 1702 as the River Cam Navigation Act 1702 (1 Ann. St. 2. c. 11) and established the conservators as a legal body with powers to collect tolls in order to maintain the river. Tolls ranged from four shillings (20p) a ton for wine to one penny (0.4p) for each passenger using the river, and the conservators, of whom there were a maximum of eleven, were empowered to mortgage the tolls in order to raise capital with which to improve the condition of the river. This they did, and built sluices at Jesus Green, Chesterton, Baits Bite and Clayhithe. Most of the tolls were collected at Clayhithe.

Denver sluice collapsed prior to 1820, and although the Corporation of Cambridge opposed its rebuilding, it was rebuilt by 1850. Tolls on the river gradually increased, from £432 in 1752, to over £1,000 in 1803. 1835 was the best year, when tolls reached £1,995, after which they declined again, although they did not drop below £1,000 until 1847. The conservators appear to have managed the river prudently, deriving a little extra revenue in rents from public houses which were constructed at each of the sluices.

River Cam Navigation Act 1813
- Act of Parliament
- Parliament of the United Kingdom
- Long title: An Act for extending and amending an Act of Queen Anne, for making the River Cham more navigable from Clayhithe Ferry to the Queen's Mill, in the County of Cambridge.
- Citation: 53 Geo. 3. c. ccxiv
- Territorial extent: United Kingdom

Dates
- Royal assent: 21 July 1813
- Commencement: 21 July 1813 (Note: The Acts of Parliament (Commencement) Act 1793.)
- Repealed: 24 July 1851
Other legislation
Repealed by	River Cam Navigation Act 1851
Relates to	River Cam Navigation Act 1702

Status: Repealed

Text of statute as originally enacted

The River Cam Navigation Act 1813 (53 Geo. 3. c. ccxiv) gave the conservators powers to raise tolls and to charge penalties, while the Bedford Level Drainage Act 1827 (7 & 8 Geo. 4. c. xlvii) extended their control over the section of river from Popes Corner to Bottisham. This act also increased the number of Conservators by two, as the Mayor of Cambridge and vice-chancellor of the University were appointed as official members of the body. They built locks at Baits Bite and Bottisham, and removed the sluice at Chesterton. They donated £400 towards the cost of rebuilding the Great Bridge in 1823, and a further £300 towards the cost of the small bridge in 1841. The following year they spent £880 on constructing a house at Clayhithe, which included a large room suitable for meetings and banquets.

River Cam Navigation Act 1851 (Note: Section 94.)
- Act of Parliament
- Parliament of the United Kingdom
- Long title: An Act for repealing and amending the Provisions of the Acts relating to the Navigation of the River Cam or Cham, alias Grant, between Clayhithe Ferry and the King's Mill in the Town of Cambridge; for altering the Navigation Tolls; for enabling the Conservators of the said River to sue and be sued in the Name of their Clerk; for conferring additional Powers; and other Purposes.
- Citation: 14 & 15 Vict. c. xcii
- Territorial extent: United Kingdom

Dates
- Royal assent: 24 July 1851
- Commencement: 24 July 1851 (Note: Section 1.)
Other legislation
Repeals/revokes	River Cam Navigation Act 1702; River Cam Navigation Act 1813; [
Amended by	River Cam Conservancy Act 1922; Cambridge Corporation Act 1932

Status: Amended

Text of statute as originally enacted

Canal Tolls and Charges, No. 8 (River Cam, &c.) Order Confirmation Act 1894
- Act of Parliament
- Parliament of the United Kingdom
- Long title: An Act to confirm a Provisional Order made by the Board of Trade under the Railway and Canal Traffic Act, 1888,[ab] containing the Classification of Merchandise Traffic, and the Schedule of Maximum Tolls and Charges applicable thereto for the River Cam Navigation, and certain other Canals.
- Citation: 57 & 58 Vict. c. cci
- Territorial extent: United Kingdom

Dates
- Royal assent: 17 August 1894
- Commencement: 1 January 1895

Status: Current legislation

Text of statute as originally enacted

The coming of the railways in 1845 brought to an end the success of the navigation. The commissioners received £1,393 from tolls in 1846 but only £367 in 1850. Two further acts of parliament were obtained, the River Cam Navigation Act 1851 (14 & 15 Vict. c. xcii) and the Canal Tolls and Charges, No. 8 (River Cam, &c.) Order Confirmation Act 1894 (57 & 58 Vict. c. cci), largely to alter the tolls, but receipts continued to fall, to £99 in 1898 and £79 in 1905. By this time, the lower river was managed by the South Level Commissioners, and the River Cam Commissioners again managed the river above Bottisham lock.

Responsibility for the lower river passed to the Environment Agency in 1995, but the conservators remain as the navigation authority for the river above Bottisham lock. The house at Clayhithe still stands, and is now the residence of the foreman of the conservators.

== Notable Conservators ==
- Gregory Wale
