= Environment Agency =

Non-departmental public body in the UK

- Logo
- Abbreviation: EA
- Formation: 1 April 1996
- Type: Non-departmental public body
- Legal status: Government agency
- Purpose: Environmental protection and regulation in England
- Headquarters: Horizon House, Deanery Road, Bristol
- Chairman: Alan Lovell
- Chief Executive: Philip Duffy
- Affiliations: Department for Environment, Food and Rural Affairs
- Website: gov.uk/ea

- Applies to: England
- Relates to: Environment

Other UK counterparts
- Northern Ireland: Northern Ireland Environment Agency
- Scotland: Scottish Environment Protection Agency
- Wales: Natural Resources Wales

The Environment Agency (EA) is a non-departmental public body, established in 1996 and sponsored by the United Kingdom government's Department for Environment, Food and Rural Affairs, with responsibilities relating to the protection and enhancement of the environment in England (and until 2013 also Wales).

Based in Bristol, the Environment Agency is responsible for flood management, waste management, regulating land and water pollution, and conservation.

== Roles and responsibilities ==
=== Purpose ===
The Environment Agency's stated purpose is, "to protect or enhance the environment, taken as a whole" so as to promote "the objective of achieving sustainable development" (taken from the Environment Act 1995, section 4). Protection of the environment relates to threats such as flood and pollution. The vision of the agency is of "a rich, healthy and diverse environment for present and future generations".

=== Scope ===
The Environment Agency's remit covers almost the whole of England, about 13 million hectares of land, 22,000 miles (35,000 km) of river and 3,100 miles (5,000 km) of coastline seawards to the three-mile limit which includes 2 million hectares of coastal waters. In a sharing arrangement with the Scottish Environment Protection Agency (SEPA), it also exercises some of its functions over parts of the catchments of the River Tweed and the Border Esk which are, for the most part, in Scotland. Similarly, in an arrangement with NRW, political and operational areas are not coterminus. NRW staff exercise responsibility for parts of the River Dee in England and EA staff exercise operational responsibility for those parts of the River Severn catchment in Wales.

=== Structure ===
The Environment Agency employs around 12,000 staff. It is organised into eight directorates that report to the chief executive.

There are two "policy and process" directorates. One deals with Flood and Coastal Risk Management and the other with Environment and Business. These are backed up by the Evidence directorate. The fourth directorate is a single Operations "delivery" unit, responsible for national services, and line management of all the regional and area staff.

The remaining directorates are central shared service groups for Finance, Legal Services, Resources and Communications.

In support of its aims, the agency acts as an operating authority, a regulatory authority and a licence authority.

=== Finance ===
The agency is funded in part from the UK government Department for Environment, Food and Rural Affairs (DEFRA). Additional money is raised from the issuing of licences and permits such as abstraction licences, waste handler registrations, navigation rights and rod (fishing) licences.

Funding for asset management and improvement and acquisition of flood risk management assets has traditionally come from local authorities via flood defence committees. This was then effectively repaid by central government in later years as part of the Formula Spending Share. In 2005 this was simplified by making a direct transfer from Treasury to the Environment Agency in the form of flood defence grant-in-aid.

The Environment Agency's total funding in 2007–08 was £1,025 million, an increase of £23 million on 2006–07. Of that total, £629 million (61 per cent) was provided in the form of 'flood defence grant-in-aid' from government (£578 million for England and £50 million for Wales). In addition, £347 million (34 per cent) was raised through statutory charging schemes and flood defence levies; and a further £50 million (5 per cent) came from other miscellaneous sources.

In 2007–08 had an operational budget of £1.025 billion, of which £628m was grant from the agency's sponsoring government departments. Approximately half the agency's expenditure is on flood risk management, and a third is spent on environment protection (pollution control). Of the remainder, 12% goes to water resources, and 6% to other water functions including navigation and wildlife.

=== Overall governance ===
Emma Howard Boyd in 2017

The Secretary of State for Environment, Food and Rural Affairs has the lead sponsorship responsibility for the Environment Agency as a whole and is responsible for the appointment of the chairman and the Environment Agency board.

In addition the Secretary of State is responsible for overall policy on the environment and sustainable development within which the agency undertakes its work; the setting of objectives for the agency's functions and its contribution to sustainable development; the approval of its budget and payment of government grant to the agency for its activities in England and approval of its regulatory and charging regimes. Its chief executive is Sir James Bevan.

Sir Philip Dilley resigned as chairman on 11 January 2016, with Emma Howard Boyd becoming acting chair. Emma Howard Boyd took up the post of chair formally on 19 September 2016.

=== Powers ===
The Environment Agency can carry out its own prosecutions. Decisions regarding potential prosecutions are made independently by the Environment Agency and are not influenced by any government department, minister or third party. All prosecutions are supervised by the Agency's Chief Prosecutor. The Agency maintains a Register of Enforcement Actions, in which all cautions and prosecutions brought against companies by the Environment Agency are published. For the enforcement of fisheries legislation, the agency employs enforcement officers, who have the power of arrest.

== History ==
The Environment Agency was created by the Environment Act 1995, and came into existence on 1 April 1996. It had responsibility for the whole of England and Wales but with specifically designated border arrangements with Scotland covering the catchment of the River Tweed. It took over the roles and responsibilities of the National Rivers Authority (NRA), Her Majesty's Inspectorate of Pollution (HMIP) and the waste regulation authorities in England and Wales including the London Waste Regulation Authority (LWRA). All of the predecessor bodies were disbanded and the local authorities relinquished their waste regulatory role. At the same time, the agency took responsibility for issuing flood warnings to the public, a role previously held by the police.

In 2010 a new national headquarters for the agency was opened at Horizon House in Deanery Road, Bristol. The building, which was designed by Alec French Architects, received Building Research Establishment Environmental Assessment (BREEAM) certification for its environmentally friendly construction and operation which includes the use of sustainable materials, natural ventilation and cooling, photoelectric panels and rainwater harvesting.

On 24 April 2013, Horizon House suffered a fire leading to its closure for several weeks. An investigation into the fire found it was the result of workmen accidentally igniting the environmentally friendly cavity wall insulation on the ground floor and due to the design of the upward airflow the fire spread quickly in the inside of the wall leading to substantial smoke damage throughout. The building was quickly evacuated and the fire under control in under an hour. The resulting internal document proposed additional standards for the handling of materials that offer environmental advantages but may be considered more susceptible to ignition.

On 1 April 2013, that part of the Environment Agency covering Wales was merged into Natural Resources Wales, a separate body managing the Welsh environment and natural resources.

== Flood and coastal risk management ==
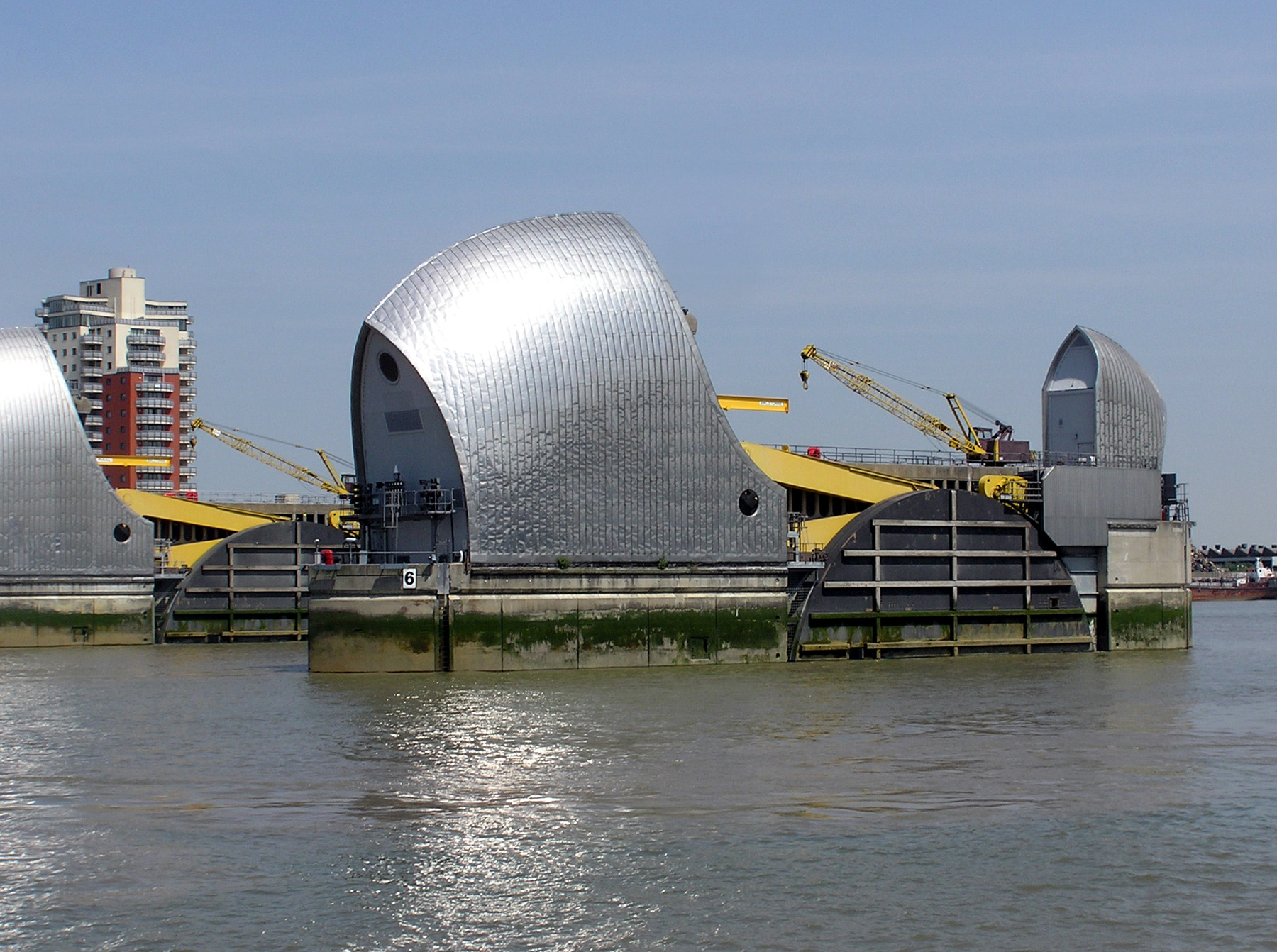
The Thames Barrier is one of the flood risk management installations operated by the Environment Agency.

The Environment Agency is the principal flood risk management operating authority. It has the power (but not the legal obligation) to manage flood risk from designated main rivers and the sea. These functions in relation to other rivers (defined as ordinary watercourses) in England are undertaken by local authorities or internal drainage boards. The Environment Agency is also responsible for increasing public awareness of flood risk, flood forecasting and warning and has a general supervisory duty for flood risk management. As of 2008 the Environment Agency also has a strategic overview role for all flood and coastal erosion risk management. The term "Flood Risk Management" in place of "Flood Defence" recognises that managed flooding is essential to meet the requirements of a sustainable flood strategy. It is often not economically feasible or even desirable to prevent all forms of flooding in all locations, and so the Environment Agency uses its powers to reduce either the likelihood or consequences of flooding.

=== Activities to reduce likelihood of flooding ===
The Environment Agency is responsible for operating, maintaining and replacing an estimated £20 billion worth of flood risk management (FRM) installations. According to a report by consultants in 2001, these are estimated to prevent annual average damage costs of approximately £3.5 billion. The agency also invests in improving or providing new installations in areas where there remains a high risk of flooding, particularly where, because of the possible consequences, the damage risk is the highest. The Thames Barrier was completed long before the EA was created but more recent examples of major defences against coastal flooding include the Medmerry managed realignment scheme in West Sussex in 2013. Recent examples of major inland flood prevention schemes include the Jubilee River.

=== Activities to reduce consequences of flooding ===
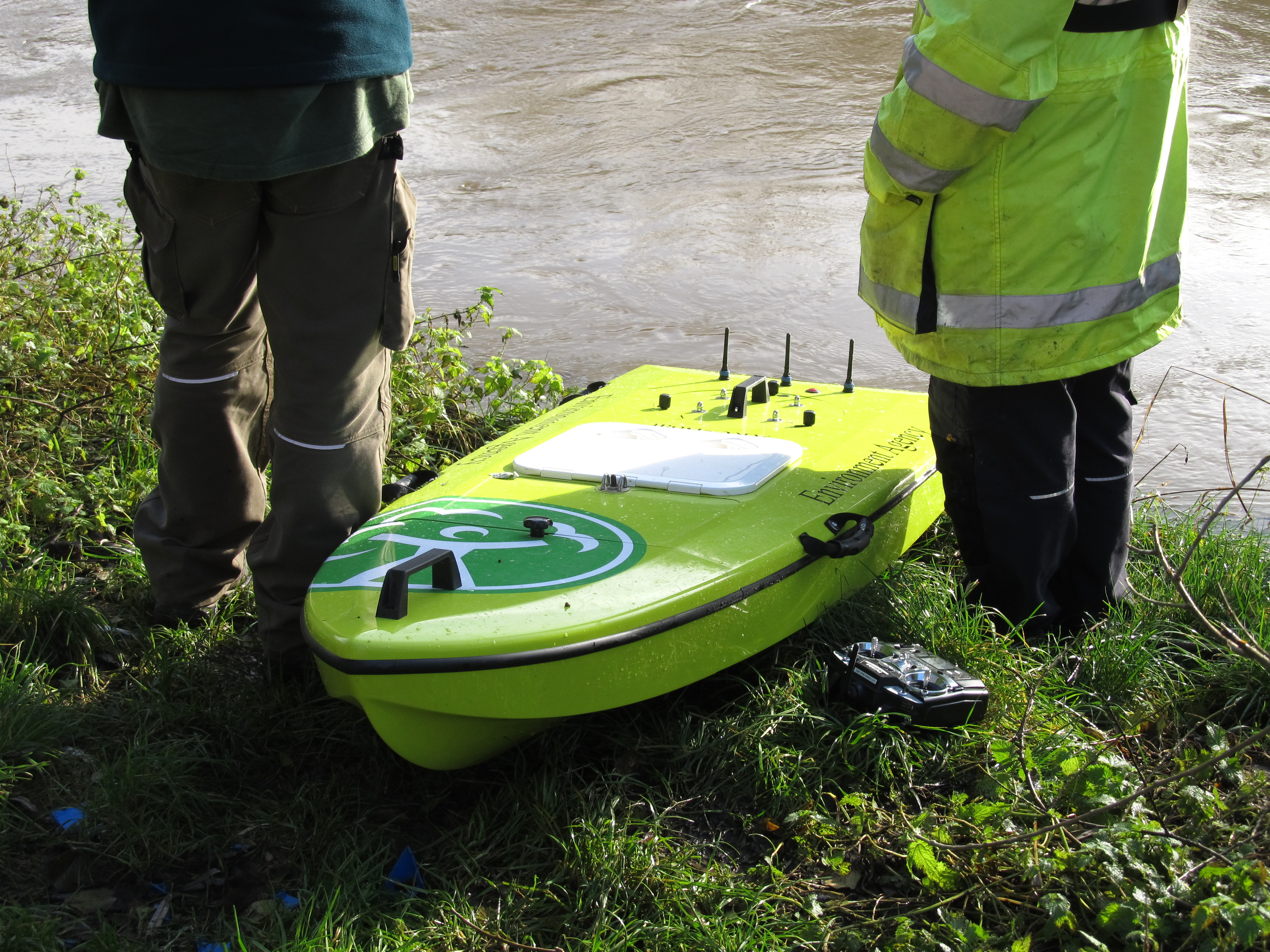
A remote controlled ARC-Boat that is used to collect river and estuarine data, assisting in flood forecasting

The Environment Agency provides flood forecasting and warning systems and maintains maps of areas liable to flood, as well as preparing emergency plans and responding when an event occurs. The Environment Agency carries out an advisory function in development control – commenting on planning applications within flood risk areas, providing advice to assist planning authorities in ensuring that any development is carried out in line with the National Planning Policy Framework. The agency provides technical advice on the flood risk assessment that must be submitted with most planning applications in flood risk areas. The agency also runs public awareness campaigns to inform those at risk who may be unaware that they live in an area that is prone to flooding, as well as providing information about what the flood warning codes and symbols mean and how to respond in the event of a flood. The agency operates Floodline for England, a 24-hour telephone helpline on flooding. Floodline covers England, Wales and Scotland but not Northern Ireland, and provides information and advice including property flood-risk checks, flood warnings, and flood preparation advice.

In partnership with the Met Office it runs the Flood Forecasting Centre (FFC) which provides warnings of flooding which may affect England and Wales. Formed in 2009, the FFC is based in the Operations Centre at the Met Office headquarters in Exeter.

== Environment and business ==
The agency is the main regulator of discharges to air, water, and land – under the provisions of a series of Acts of Parliament. It does this through the issue of formal consents to discharge or, in the case of large, complex or potentially damaging industries by means of a permit. Failure to comply with such a consent or permit or making a discharge without the benefit of a consent can lead to criminal prosecution. A magistrates' court can impose fines of up to £50,000 or 12 months imprisonment for each offence of causing or knowingly permitting pollution. If prosecuted in the Crown Court, there is no limit on the amount of the fine and sentences of up to five years imprisonment may be imposed on those responsible for the pollution or on the directors of companies causing pollution.

The agency has an important role in conservation and ecology specifically along rivers and in wetlands. More general responsibility for the countryside and natural environment in England falls to the organisation Natural England. The Environment Agency's activities support users of the rivers and wetlands, including anglers and boaters.

=== Climate change ===
The agency states that they take a "leading role in limiting and preparing for the impacts of climate change."

=== Air quality ===
The agency is a regulator for the release of air pollutants into the atmosphere from large, complex industrial processes. This will soon include emissions from some large-scale agricultural activities, but air pollutant releases from many agricultural activities will continue to be unregulated.

Major sources of air pollution, such as transport, are subject to various measures at the European, national and local level. Local authorities regulate air pollution from smaller industrial processes. The agency works with local authorities, National Highways and others to implement the UK government's air quality strategy in England as mandated in the Environment Act 1995. The Environment Agency has an Air Quality Modelling and Assessment Unit (AQMAU) that aims to ensure that air quality assessments for permit applications, enforcement and air pollution incident investigations are consistent, of a high standard and based on sound science.

=== Land quality ===
The agency is the regulatory authority for all waste management activities including the licensing of sites such as landfill, incineration and recycling facilities. It also regulates the movement of hazardous wastes such as fibrous asbestos, infectious clinical wastes and harmful chemicals. The agency issues environmental permits to waste management sites and any individuals or companies found to have caused pollution or have infringed their licence conditions can be prosecuted. In serious cases the Environment Agency has the power to revoke the environmental permits issued to sites that contravene the conditions of their permits stopping all waste handling activities.

=== Water quality ===
The agency has a duty to maintain and improve the quality of surface waters and ground-waters and, as part of the duty, it monitors the quality of rivers, lakes, the sea and groundwater on a regular basis. Much of this information is required by law under the provisions of a number of European Directives to be reported both to Parliament and to be made public. Some of these duties have been in force through predecessor agencies and as a consequence the agency maintains some long term data sets which in some cases such as the harmonised monitoring scheme exceed 30 years of consistent data collection.

Monitoring is also carried out of many discharges to the aquatic environment including sewage effluents and trade and agricultural discharges.

=== Water resources ===
The agency manages the use and conservation of water through the issue of water abstraction licences for activities such as drinking water supply, artificial irrigation and hydro-electricity generation. The agency is in charge of inland rivers, estuaries and harbours in England. Its remit also extends into Scotland in the River Tweed and River Solway catchments where special arrangements exist with SEPA to avoid duplication but retain management on a catchment basis.

Complex arrangements exist for the management of river regulation reservoirs, which are used to store winter water in the wetter parts of England to maintain levels in the summer time so that there is sufficient water to supply the drier parts of the country with drinking water.

=== Fishing ===
The Environment Agency fisheries service has a statutory duty to maintain, improve and develop migratory and freshwater fisheries as set out in the Environment Act 1995. The interpretation of this is set out in Ministerial guidance as:

- To ensure the conservation and maintain the diversity of freshwater and migratory fish, and to conserve their aquatic environment;
- To enhance the contribution migratory and freshwater fisheries make to the economy, particularly in remote rural areas and in areas with low levels of income; and
- To enhance the social value of fishing as a widely available and healthy form of recreation.

The Environment Agency has the power under the Salmon and Freshwater Fisheries Act 1975 to license fishing for salmon trout, freshwater fish, eels, lamprey and smelt and to set duties for the provision of fishing licences.

Fishing licence income along with a small amount of Grant in Aid (GiA) provides the funding to deliver the statutory duty to maintain, improve and develop freshwater and migratory fisheries, including the current fisheries service provided to recreational anglers.

The EA's funding principles mean that income from the sale of fishing licences is entirely ringfenced re-invested back into fisheries work.

Many of the societal and environmental outcomes the fisheries service currently deliver, and aspire to deliver on a greater scale, is through partnership working. Working with partners such as the Angling Trust, the Wild Trout Trust and the Riverfly partnership allows the EA to maximise fishing licence income through match funding to deliver against key benefits for fishing and fisheries across the country.

Income from fishing licence sales is used to fund vital work to improve and protect fish and fisheries. Income generated is invested directly back into the angling community, improving fish stocks, boosting opportunities for anglers as well as undertaking fisheries enforcement, habitat improvement and fish rescues when needed. It is not used to fund wider water quality investigations or enforcement action. This is funded directly by government.

=== Navigation ===
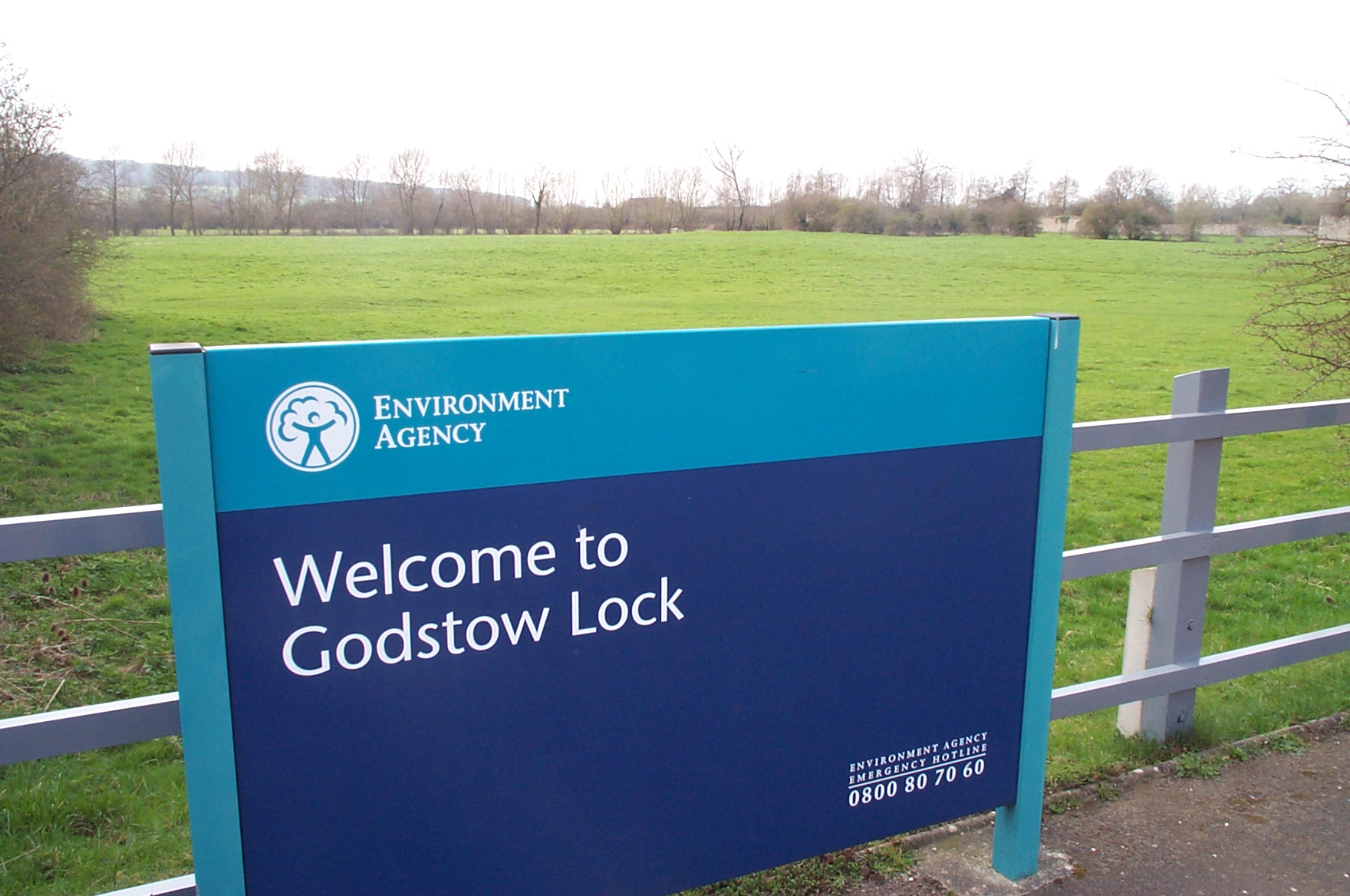
The Environment Agency operates numerous locks, such as this one at Godstow, Oxfordshire.

After the Canal & River Trust, the Environment Agency is the second largest navigation authority in the United Kingdom managing navigation for 634 miles (1,020 km) of England's rivers. The Agency's lock-keepers maintain and operate systems of sluices, weirs and locks to manage water-levels for navigation, and where necessary to control flooding. Annual spending to maintain these installations, with an estimated replacement value of £700M, is around £22m per annum. The agency uses the registration fees of some 31,000 craft on the waterways to provide some of the income.

The agency's responsibilities include the non-tidal River Thames, the Medway Navigation, River Wye and River Lugg, the Royal Military Canal and the Fens and Anglian systems. The Environment Agency is organising the Fens Waterways Link a major construction project to link rivers in the Fens and Anglian Systems for navigation. The first stage is the South Forty-Foot Drain. Functions in relation to most canals are undertaken by the Canal and River Trust.

=== Other marine responsibilities ===
The Environment Agency is the harbour authority for Rye and the conservancy authority for the Dee Estuary. The Environment Agency has also published information about tidal bores, these being the Trent Aegir and the Severn bore.

== Equipment and fleet ==
The EA operates a variety of equipment and machinery along with a transport fleet in order to carry out the specialised duties of its officers, namely in survey, incident response and monitoring. Due to the remit of the EA, this includes land vehicles, marine vessels and light aircraft.

=== Land ===
- Land Rover Defender
- Mitsubishi Outlander PHEV

=== Sea ===
- Sentry I, II, III (Cheetah Marine catamaran)
- Thames / Severn / Humber Guardian survey vessel

=== Air ===
- Reims-Cessna F406

== Consultation and influencing ==
The agency uses its influence and provides education to change attitudes and behaviour towards the environment. Action, in several policy areas, is directed towards business and commerce at all levels, children in education, the general public and government and local government. This last area is quite distinct from the agency's statutory role to advise government.

In local government planning processes, the Environment Agency is a statutory consultee on all planning matters from county strategic plans down to individual planning applications. In reality only those applications judged to pose special risks to the environment are commented on in any detail. For many years the agency has been offering strong advice against the development of land in floodplains because of the risk of flooding. Whilst in some instances, this advice may not have been appreciated in its entirety, in a large number of cases this advice has been used to reach decisions on planning applications.

The Environment Agency is also an advisory board member of the River Restoration Centre at Cranfield University.

== Advice to government ==
Until the formation of the Environment Agency, the government took specialist advice on the management of the environment from civil servants employed in appropriate ministries. This led to considerable duplication of effort and frequent disagreements between government and the regulatory agencies. The Environment Agency now advises government directly about those issues within its purview.

== Organisation ==
The operational arm of the Environment Agency consists of 14 areas, all of which report to the director of operations. As of April 2014, the Environment Agency removed its regional level of administration (formerly Anglian Region, Midlands Region, North West Region, South East Region, South West Region and Yorkshire & North East Region) to be replaced by an "area once, national once" model. The 14 area names were also changed to better reflect the areas that they serve. The new area names are:

- North
  - North East
  - Cumbria and Lancashire
  - Yorkshire
  - Greater Manchester, Merseyside and Cheshire
- West and Central
  - Lincolnshire and Northamptonshire
  - East Midlands
  - West Midlands
  - Wessex
  - Devon, Cornwall and the Isles of Scilly
- South East
  - East Anglia
  - Hertfordshire and North London
  - Thames
  - Solent and South Downs
  - Kent, South London and East Sussex

== Criticism ==
Since the establishment of the Environment Agency several major flood events have occurred and the Agency has been the target of criticism. A number of reports have been produced which chart various developments in flood management.

=== Easter 1998 floods and Bye report ===
At Easter 1998, the equivalent of one months rain fell in the Midlands in 24 hours and flooding caused £400m damage and five deaths. In the light of criticism, the Agency commissioned a report from a review team under the Chairmanship of Peter Bye, a former chief executive of Suffolk CC. The report concluded that in many respects, the Environment Agency's policies, plans and operational arrangements were sound, and that staff did their best in extreme circumstances, but there were instances of unsatisfactory planning, inadequate warnings for the public, incomplete defences and poor co-ordination with emergency services. Specifically the report highlighted the flood warning system and said the scale of the damage could have been avoided if the agency had issued more advice to those living in the worst affected areas and noted "People who do not understand what they can do to protect themselves when they are warned are not protected."

=== Autumn 2000 floods and Learning to Live with Rivers ===
In the Autumn 2000 floods, damage was reduced by flood defences and by timely warnings and evacuations where the defences could not hold back the water. As a result, 280,000 properties were protected from the floods, but over 10,000 properties were still flooded at an estimated cost of £1 billion. Defra commissioned an independent review by the Institution of Civil Engineers under George Fleming. The review was to consider methods of estimating and reducing flood risk and look at whether flood risk management could make more use of natural processes. Other terms of reference included the possible impact of climate change and experience of other countries. The resulting report entitled Learning to Live with Rivers specifically criticised a reluctance to use computer models and inadequate representation of the dynamic effects of land use, catchment processes and climatic variability. More broadly, the report noted that sustainable flood risk management could only be achieved by working with the natural response of the river basin and by providing the necessary storage, flow reduction and discharge capacity. It concluded that floods can only be managed, not prevented, and the community must learn to live with rivers.

=== June 2007 National Audit Office report ===
On 15 June 2007 the National Audit Office produced a report on the performance of the Environment Agency with respect to its administrative targets and information systems. The report highlighted that the Environment Agency had not reached its targets for maintaintaining flood defence systems and producing catchment area plans, and that since 2001 the general conditions of assets had not improved significantly. It concluded the agency could reduce the need for extra funding by improving cost effectiveness.

On the basis of the report, and to the background of the Summer 2007 floods, on 27 June 2007 the Committee of Public Accounts under Edward Leigh subjected the Environment Agency management to severe interrogation and concluded that the agency had "not delivered protection for the British people". Issuing a strong response, the chief executive rejected the charge that the Environment Agency has massively failed, as alleged in the commons public accounts committee, noting that in the last seven years, defences had been created to protect 100,000 homes in floodplains, numbers receiving flood warning had dramatically increased and greatly improved flood mapping and forecasting had been implemented.

=== Summer 2007 floods and the Pitt review ===
Following the 2007 United Kingdom floods, which left 13 people dead, 44,600 homes flooded and caused £3bn damage, Defra announced an independent review by Sir Michael Pitt.

The Environment Agency directors attracted criticism when it emerged that shortly before the floods they had received five-figure "performance bonuses", with numerous calls for the bonuses to be donated to flood relief funds. An opposition spokesperson raised a question over the timing of the release of the information—"just as MPs left for their 11-week summer recess—guaranteeing minimum parliamentary scrutiny".

Pitt's review, published in full in June 2008 contained 92 recommendations looking at all aspects of the "biggest civil emergency in British history". Of these, thirteen were directed at the Environment Agency, the first of which stated that the Environment Agency should take on a national overview of all flood risk (2). It recommended the Environment Agency should further develop its modelling tools and techniques working with its partners on such (4)(5), and also make flood visualisation data more accessible (36)(37). It recommended closer working with the Met Office (6)(34)(35)(65), which lead to the opening of the Flood Forecasting Centre. The Agency should provide a more specific flood warning system for infrastructure operators (33), work with local responders to raise awareness in flood risk areas (61) and work with telecoms companies to roll out telephone flood warning schemes. Other recommendations were that the Environment Agency should continue its existing processes (8)(25).

The review also argued that the government's £800 million-a-year flood defence budget for 2010 to 2011 was "about right" but stated that money should be spent more wisely. Sir Michael Pitt said: "What we are arguing is that we were not well prepared last summer for the scale of flooding that took place."

After the 2007 floods, the present organisation of flood management in England and Wales, with a large number of separate bodies responsible for different components, was called into question. George Fleming, who chaired the committee which produced the Learning to Live with Rivers report argued that the Environment Agency had too many roles and faced too great a conflict between its roles as habitat protector and planning regulator and suggested it was time to break it up and create a dedicated Flood Management Agency. On leaving her post as CEO in June 2008 Barbara Young responded to these suggestions, predicting that the Pitt report was unlikely to recommend the break-up of the Environment Agency.

=== Winter 2013–14 floods ===
The Environment Agency and its then chair Chris Smith was involved with a row with Environment Secretary Owen Paterson and other members of the government, and landowners and residents in Somerset. The row focused on the flooding of the Somerset Levels and whether the River Parrett should be dredged.

=== Winter 2015–16 floods ===
The Environment Agency, responsible for main river maintenance, was criticised for failures which led to flooding following a period of heavy rainfall in December 2015 (Storm Desmond, Storm Eva) across northern England and parts of Scotland. In particular, the decision to open a barrier on the River Foss resulted in flooding of supposedly protected houses. This wasn't a decision taken lightly however, there was a strong chance the barrier could have broken down while closed leading to a much greater risk of flooding. Additionally, the Environment Agency was accused of misleading the public by stating that its chairman Philip Dilley was "at home with his family" when he was at his wife's family home in Barbados. In the days following the floods, it was reported that Agency staff responsible for protecting the UK from flooding were paid almost £300,000 in bonuses or received large payoffs in 2015, including the Environment Agency's publicity chief who led the press team who tried to cover-up their chairman's absence; Pam Gilder quit with a £112,000 pay-off.

The extent of damage caused in such a short period across wide areas has brought into focus the overall performance of UK central government flood defence strategies. Expensive flood defence systems were proven ineffective and in some cases appeared to increase the problem. Professor Dieter Helm, Chair of the UK government's Natural Capital Committee stated in January 2016: "Flooding crises tend to follow an established pattern. First, there is immediate help and assistance. Then second, there is a "review". On occasions, this leads to a third stage of genuine reform, but in most cases "sticking plasters" are applied. These are incremental and often sensible, but typically fail to address the core issues and hence provide only a temporary respite. There are very good reasons why "sticking plasters" will not work this time. The conventional approach to flood defence, carried out by the Environment Agency (EA), and financed largely by the Treasury, is at best inefficient. Sometimes it is even counterproductive, encouraging the sorts of land use and land management decisions that can actually make flooding worse in the medium term."

The House of Commons Select Committee for the Environment challenged the Chief Executive Officer of the Environment Agency on its performance by stating: "You [Sir James Bevan, CEO] said "The capacity of a river doesn't matter!" You've got to be certain the leopard has changed its spots. And I will keep repeating this. You haven't really given us an answer as to whether you have monitored the situation. I'm fearful. You allowed the River Parrett [Somerset] to silt up, you allowed the Tone to silt up, you allowed the tributaries to silt up, and then it flooded." The Committee added: "The EA don't provide [quotes for work] when doing projects so we can't compare like with like [with other project providers]. There is an argument for transparency on your spending... You say the right words and hold onto your power."

Sir Philip Dilley resigned as chairman of the Environment Agency on 11 January 2016. Dilley stated he was stepping down because "expectations" of his role have changed to mean he has to be "available at short notice throughout the year".

== Past and present officers ==
Chairman:

- Lord de Ramsey (1996–2000)
- Sir John Harman (2000–2008)
- Lord Smith (July 2008–September 2014)
- Sir Philip Dilley (September 2014–January 2016)
- Emma Howard Boyd (January 2016–September 2022)
- Alan Lovell (from September 2022)

Chief Executive:

- Professor Ed Gallagher (1995–2000)
- Barbara Young, Baroness Young of Old Scone (2000–2008)
- Paul Leinster (June 2008–September 2015)
- David Rooke (acting, September 2015–November 2015)
- Sir James Bevan (November 2015-March 2023)
- John Curtin (acting, April 2023–June 2023)
- Philip Duffy (from July 2023)

== See also ==
- Atmospheric Dispersion Modelling Liaison Committee
- European Environment Agency
- Infrastructure asset management
- List of environmental organisations
- List of estuaries of England
- List of rivers of England
- List of rivers of Wales
- Natural Resources Wales
- Northern Ireland Environment Agency
- Scottish Environment Protection Agency
- UK Dispersion Modelling Bureau
